= Wedding =

Ceremony where two people become partners

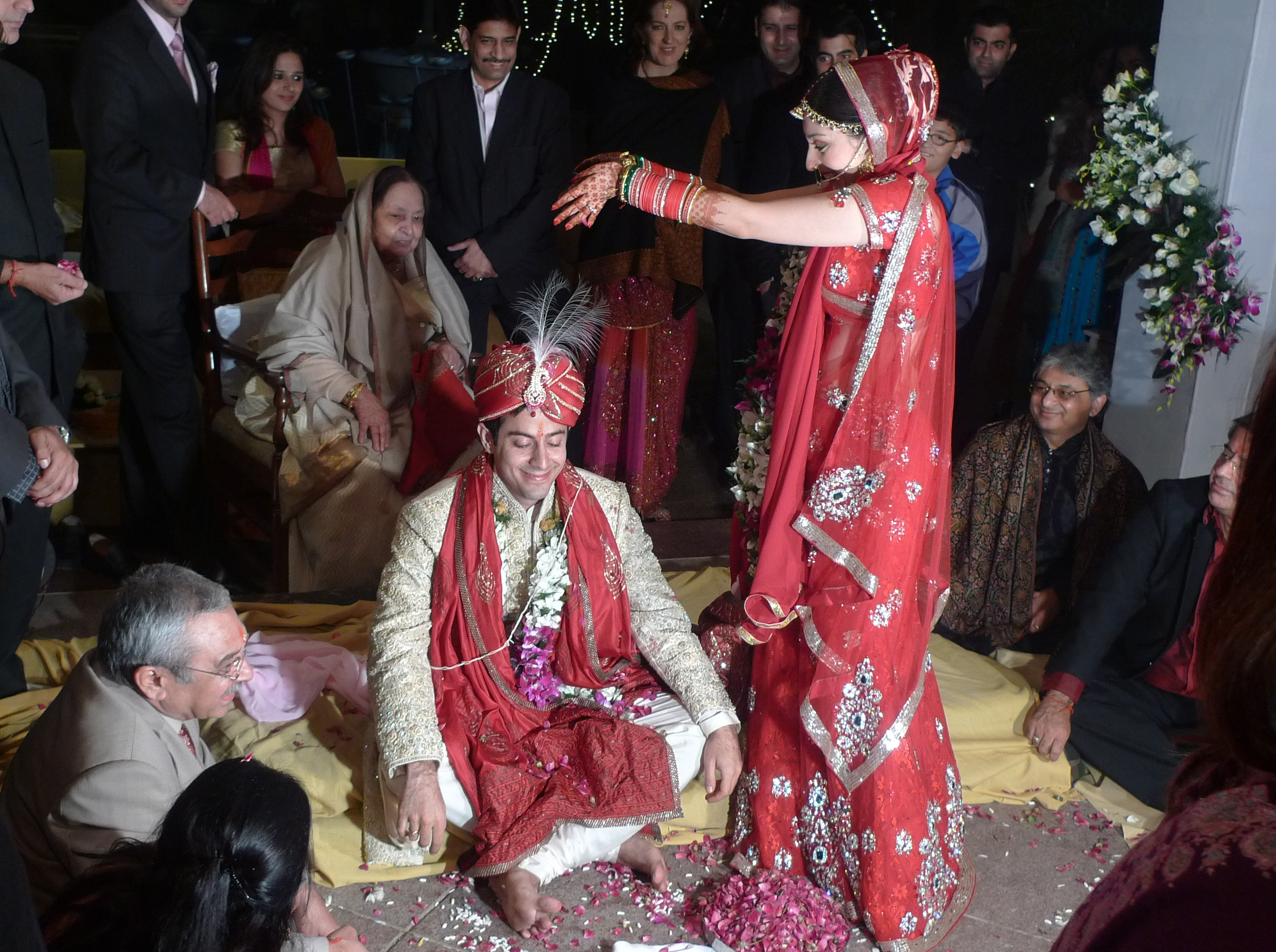
Kashmiri Hindu wedding (India)

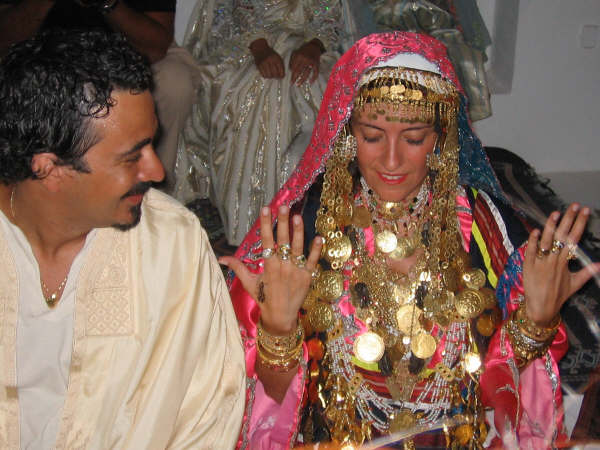
Muslim wedding (Tunisia)

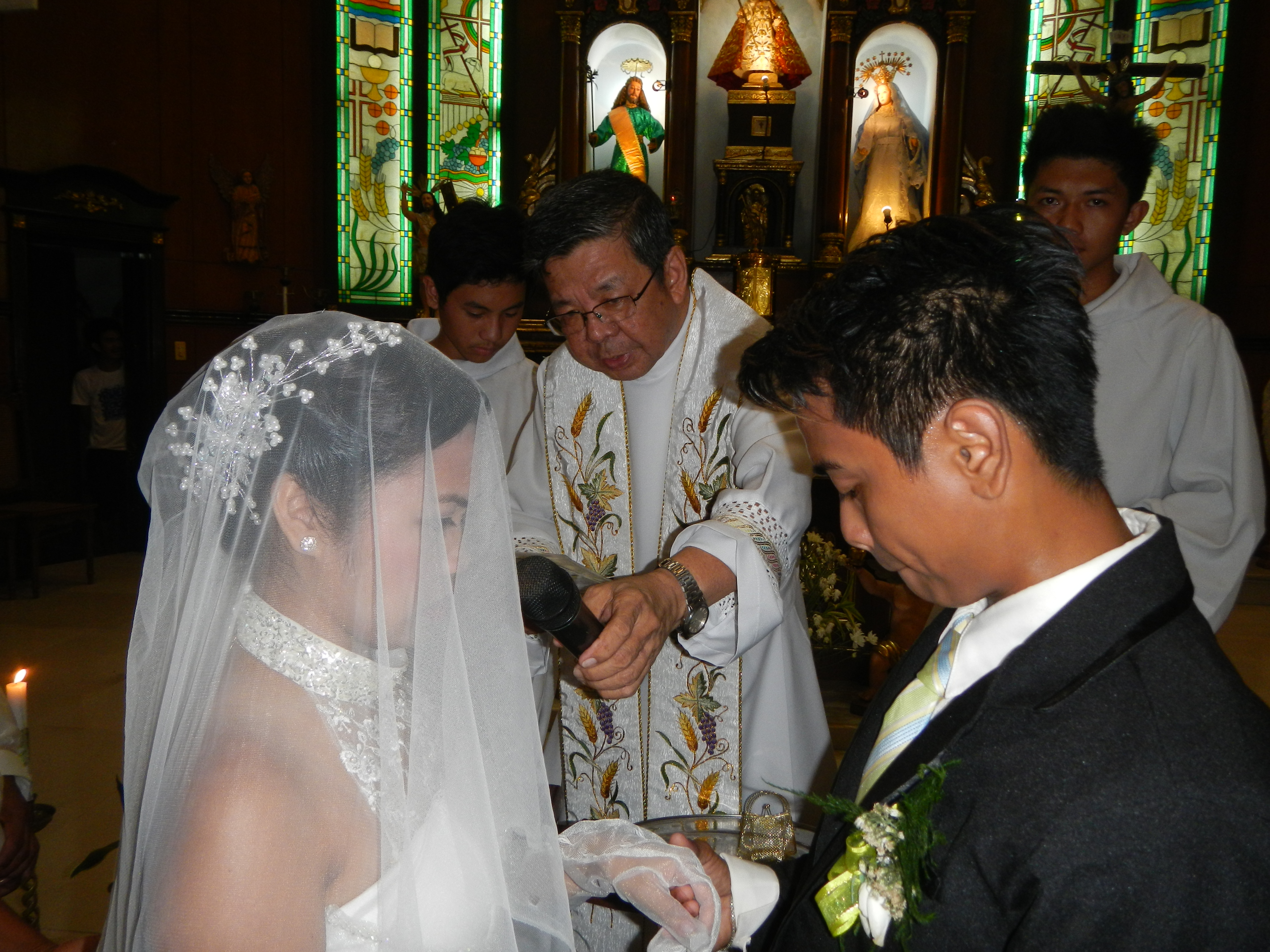
Roman Catholic white wedding (Philippines)

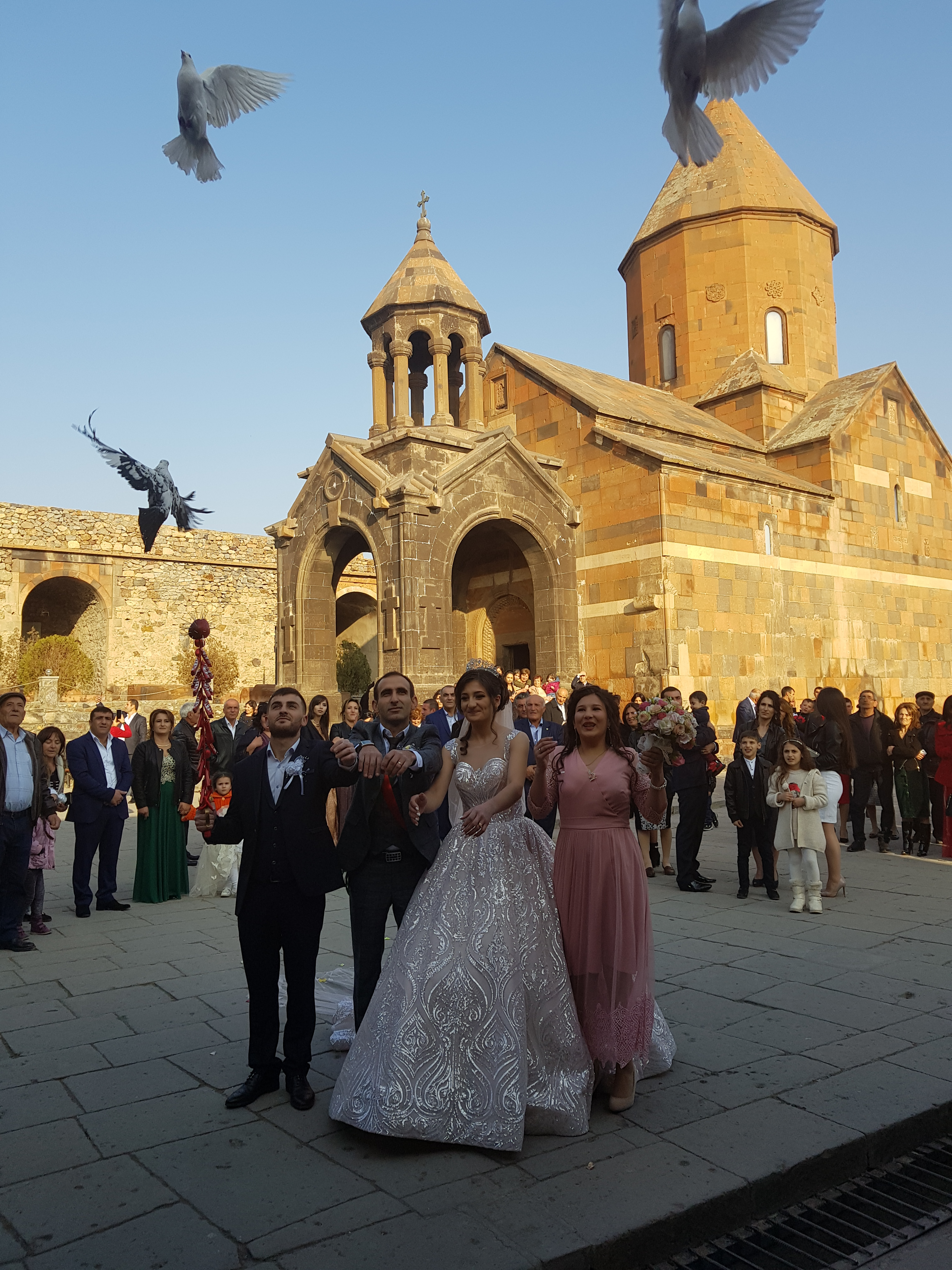
Armenian Orthodox wedding

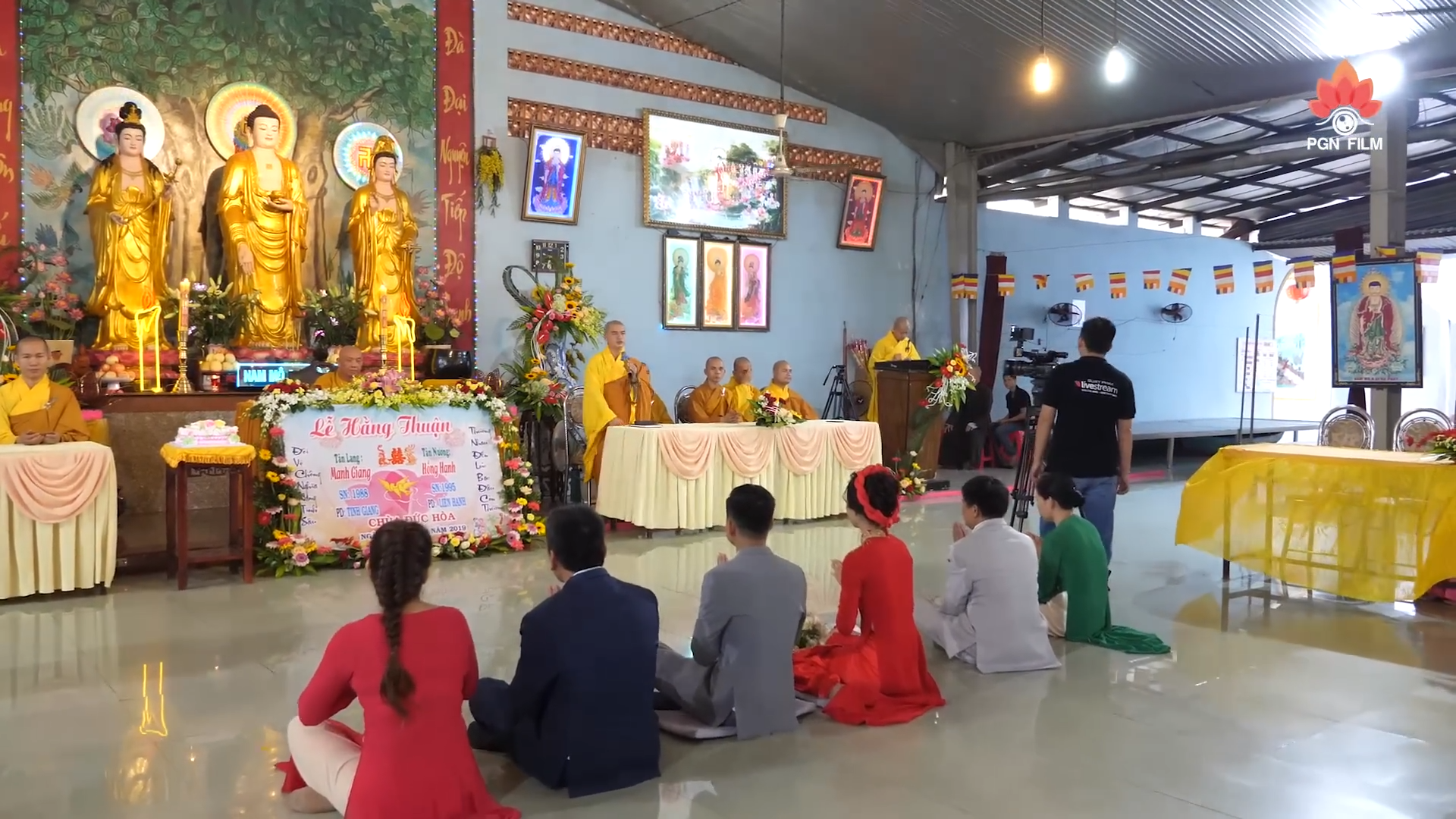
Vietnamese Buddhist wedding

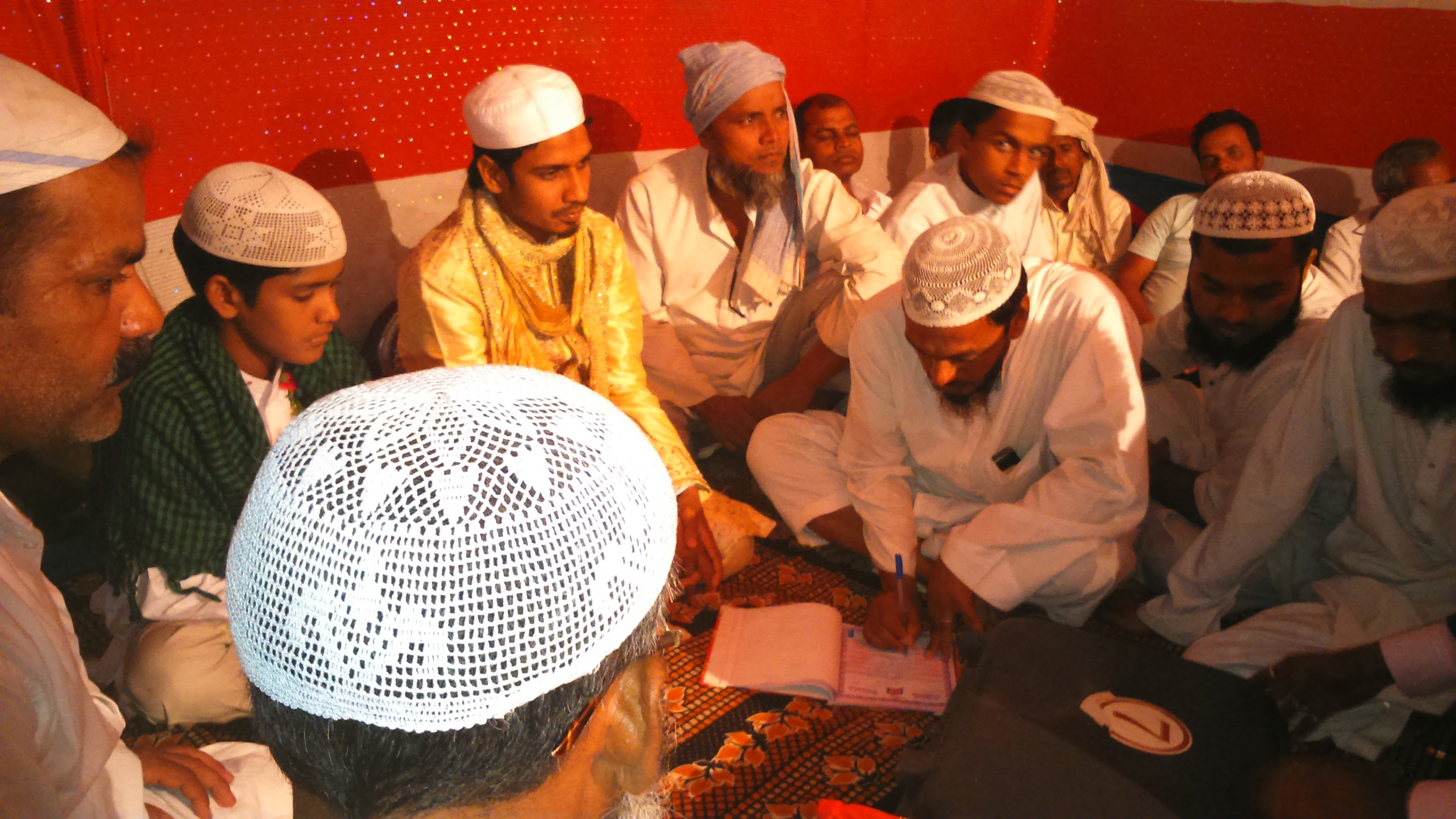
A Muslim wedding ceremony in Bihar, India

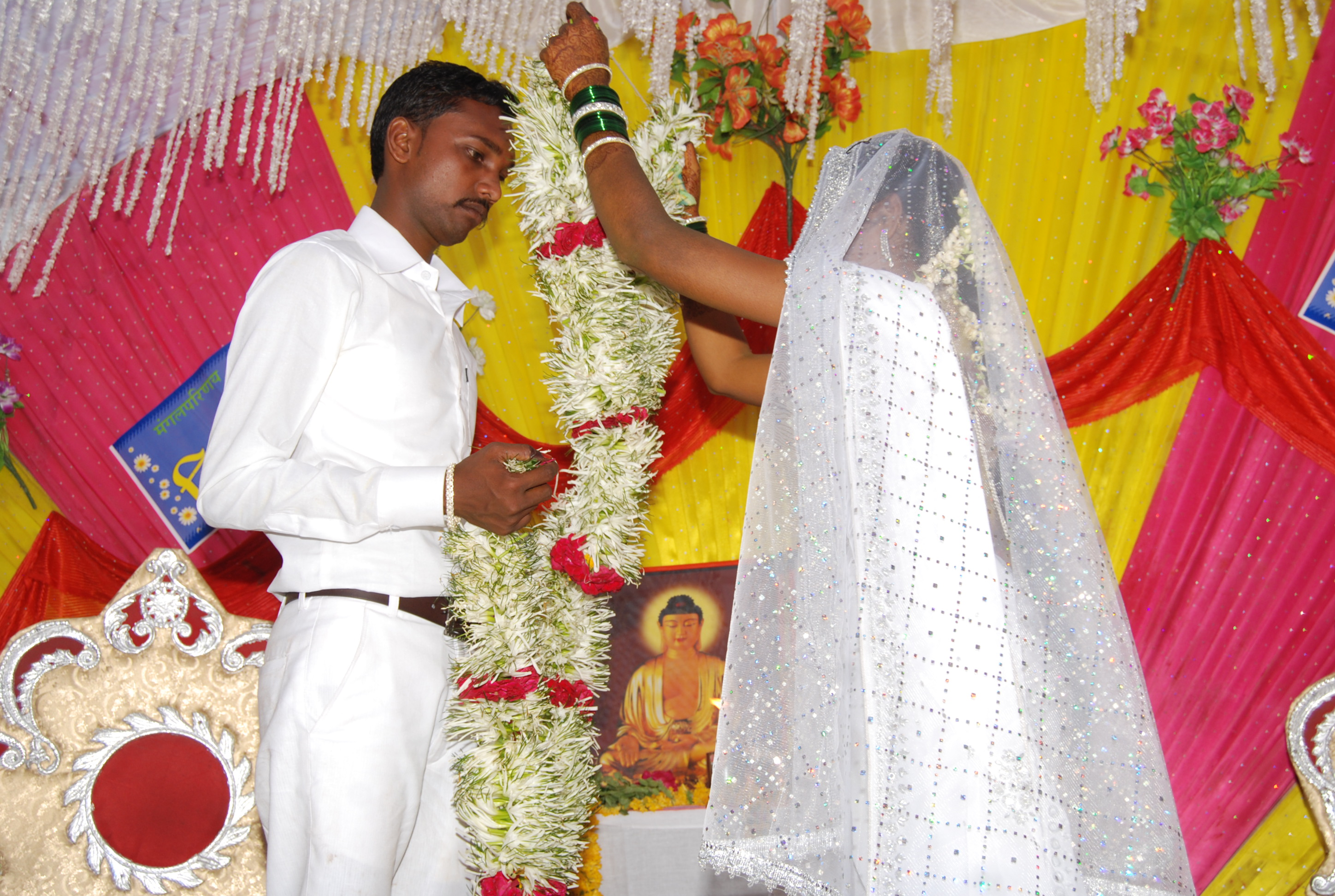
Traditional Buddhist wedding ceremony in India

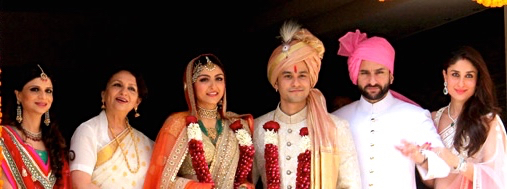
Couple from India after traditional Hindu wedding

A wedding is a ceremony in which two people are united in marriage. Wedding traditions and customs vary greatly between cultures, ethnicities, races, religions, denominations, countries, social classes, and sexual orientations. Most wedding ceremonies involve an exchange of marriage vows by a couple; a presentation of a gift (e.g., an offering, rings, a symbolic item, flowers, money, or a dress); and a public proclamation of marriage by an authority figure or celebrant. Special wedding garments are often worn, and the ceremony is sometimes followed by a wedding reception. Music, poetry, prayers, or readings from religious texts or literature are also commonly incorporated into the ceremony, as well as superstitious customs.

== Common elements across cultures ==
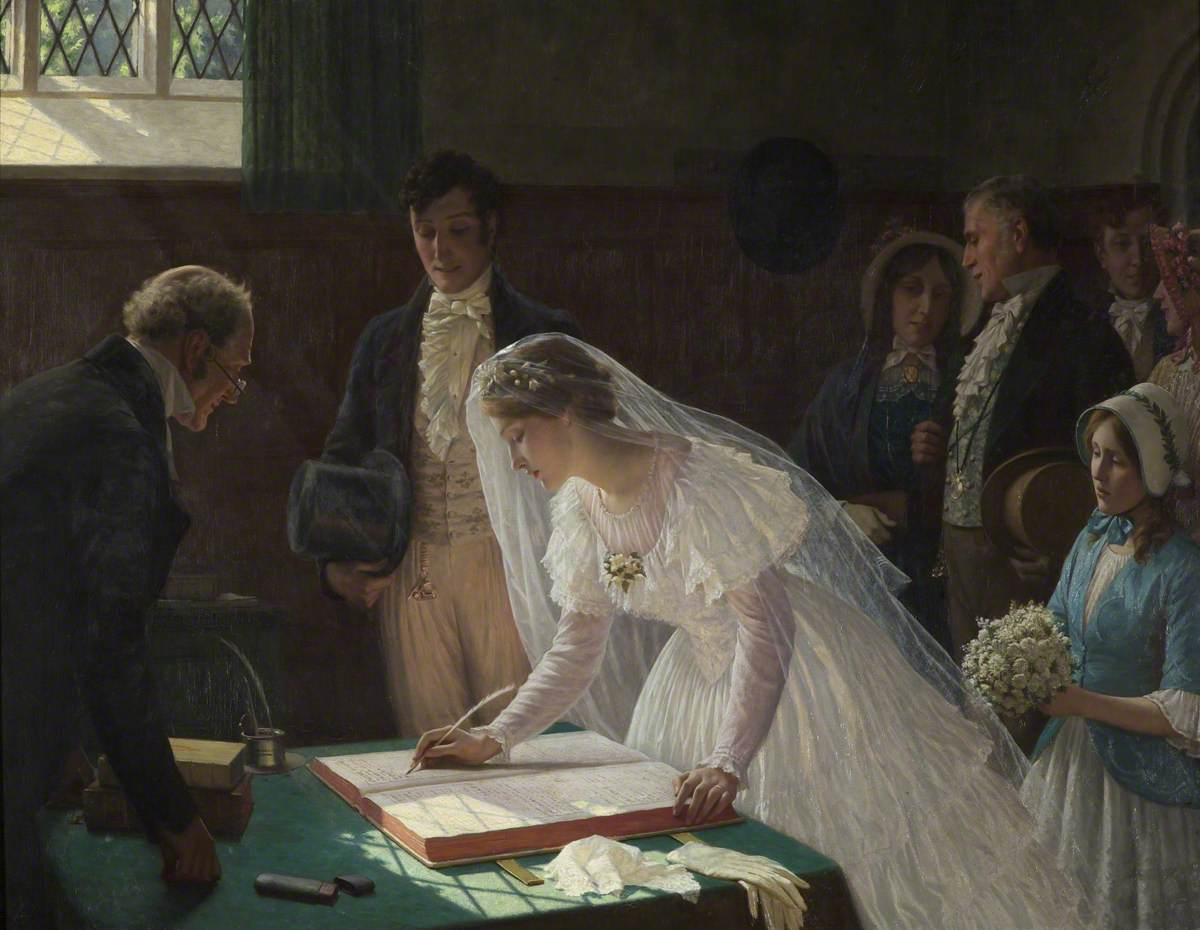
Many cultures have adopted the traditional Western custom of a white wedding, when a bride wears a white wedding dress and veil. Painting by Edmund Leighton (1853–1922).

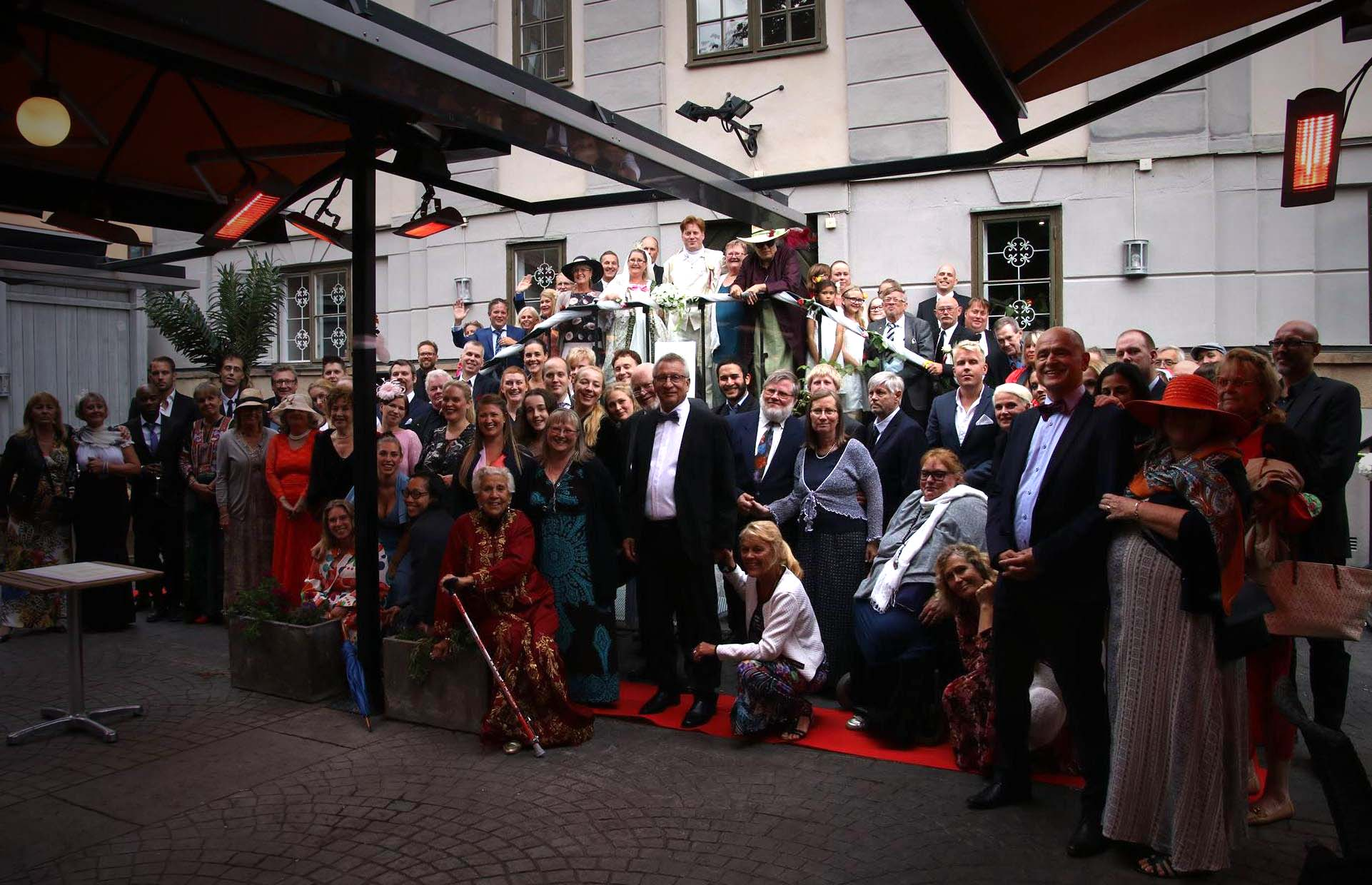
Wedding party at Stockholm's Lillienhoff Palace in Sweden in 2017

Some cultures have adopted the traditional Western custom of the white wedding, in which a bride wears a white wedding dress and veil. This tradition was popularized through the marriage of Queen Victoria. Some say Queen Victoria's choice of a white gown may have simply been a sign of extravagance, but may have also been influenced by the values she held which emphasized sexual purity.

The use of a wedding ring has long been part of religious weddings in Indian sub-continent, Europe and America, but the origin of the tradition is unclear. One possibility is the Roman belief in the vena amoris, which was believed to be a blood vessel that ran from the fourth finger (ring finger) directly to the heart. Thus, when a couple wore rings on this finger, their hearts were connected. Historian Vicki Howard points out that the belief in the "ancient" quality of the practice is most likely a modern invention. In the United States, a groom's wedding band has not appeared until the early 20th century, while in Europe it has been part of the tradition since the ancient Romans, as witnessed by the jurist Gaius.

The exit from the wedding ceremony is also called the "send off" and often includes traditional practices; for instance, in Ethiopian weddings, newlyweds and the rest of the wedding party bow and kiss the elders' knees. In most of the Western world, as well as in countries such as India and Malaysia, the send off often includes the practice of throwing rice (a symbol of prosperity and fertility) or other seeds at the newlyweds. Despite popular belief, using uncooked rice for this purpose is not harmful to birds. In several cultures, people toss shoes instead of rice.

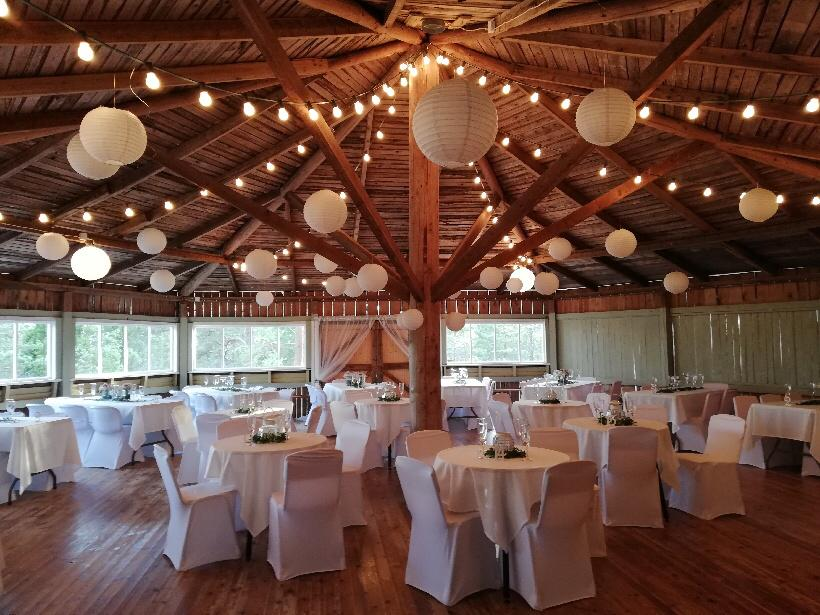
Wedding decorations at the Mahnala Stage (Mahnalan lava) in Hämeenkyrö, Pirkanmaa, Finland in July 2019

The wedding ceremony is often followed by a wedding reception or wedding breakfast, in which the rituals may include speeches from a groom, best man, father of a bride and possibly a bride, the newlyweds' first dance as a couple, and the cutting of an elegant wedding cake. In recent years traditions have changed to include a father-daughter dance for a bride and her father, and sometimes also a mother-son dance for a groom and his mother.

== Locations ==
In some countries there are restrictions on where a wedding may take place, for example before the Marriage Act 1994, marriages in England and Wales could only take place in authorized religious buildings or civil register offices, but the Act extended the options available to allow weddings in other "approved premises". Cretney identified a wide range of venues which sought approval after the implementation of this legal change, including funeral homes, hotels, stately homes, baseball fields, football grounds, basketball courts, beaches, cemetery chapels, mausoleum chapels, town halls, museums, performing arts centers, health clubs, urban parks and former warships. Related outdoor locations could also be approved for weddings after the Marriages and Civil Partnerships (Approved Premises) (Amendment) Regulations 2022 were adopted.

== Traditional wedding attire ==
- Western dress code
  - Wedding dress (or bridal gown), a special dress worn by a bride.
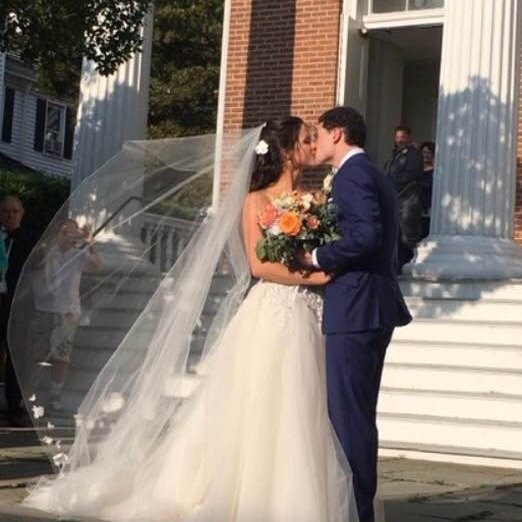
  - Traditional Western wedding veil
    Wedding veil, popularized by Queen Victoria, was a long-held custom in which the 'purity' and 'innocence' of the bride could thwart evil spirits.
  - Morning dress, western daytime formal dress
  - White tie ("evening dress" in the U.K; very formal evening attire)
  - Black tie or Evening Suit ("dinner jacket" in the U.K; often referred to as a tuxedo in the U.S. and Canada; traditionally appropriate only for use after 6:00 p.m.)
  - Stroller
  - Lounge suit
  - Non-traditional "tuxedo" variants (colored jackets/ties, "wedding suits")
- Ao dai, traditional garments of Vietnam
- Barong tagalog, an embroidered, formal men's garment of the Philippines
- Batik and Kebaya, a garment worn by the Javanese people of Indonesia and also by the Malay people of Malaysia
- Dashiki, the traditional West African wedding attire
- Dhoti, male garment in South India
- Hanbok, the traditional garment of Korea
- Kilt, male garment particular to Scottish culture
- Kittel, a white robe worn by the groom at an Orthodox Jewish wedding. A kittel is worn only under a chuppah and is removed before the reception.
- Qun Gua or Kua (裙褂 pinyin qún guà, Cantonese kwàhn kwáa), Chinese traditional formal wear. This can be in the form of a qipao or hanfu.
- Ribbon shirt, often worn by Native American men on auspicious occasions, such as weddings. Another common custom is to wrap the bride and groom in a blanket.
- Sampot, traditional dress in Cambodia
- Sari/Lehenga, Indian popular and traditional dress in India
- Sherwani, a long coat-like garment worn in South Asia
- Shiromuku Kimono, a traditional wedding garment in Japan
- Shweshwe, a female dress worn by Basotho women during special ceremonies. It has recently been adopted in men's attire as well.
- Tiara, or wedding crown, worn by Syrian and Greek couples (which are called "τα στέφανα", which literally means "wreaths") and Scandinavian brides
- Topor, a type of conical headgear traditionally worn by grooms as part of a Bengali Hindu wedding ceremony
Different wedding clothing around the world

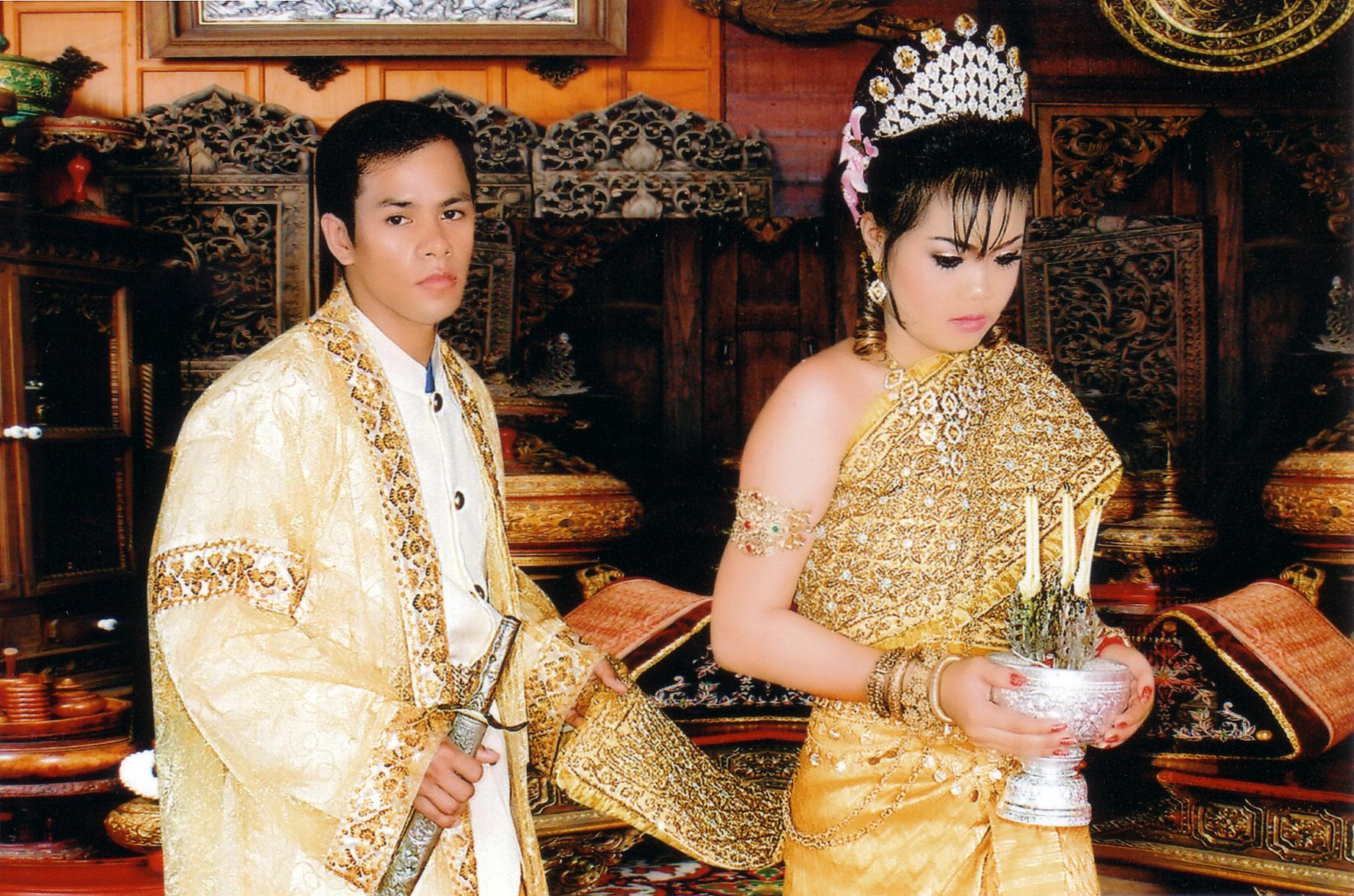
Khmer (Cambodian) wedding in traditional outfits

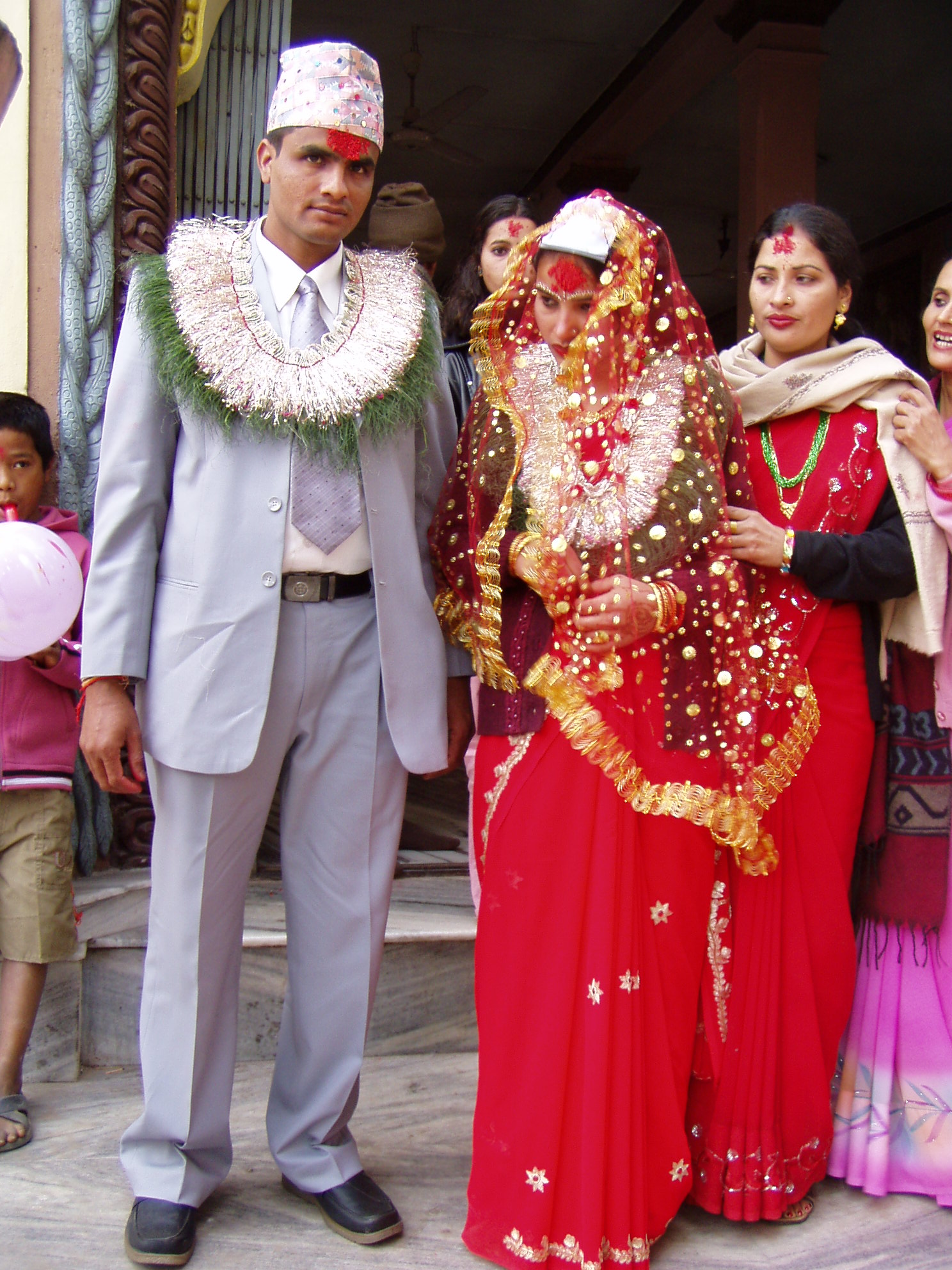
A bride and a bridegroom in Nepal

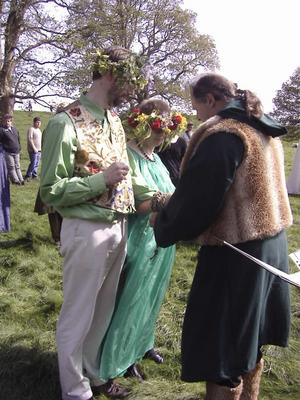
Neopagan handfasting ceremony

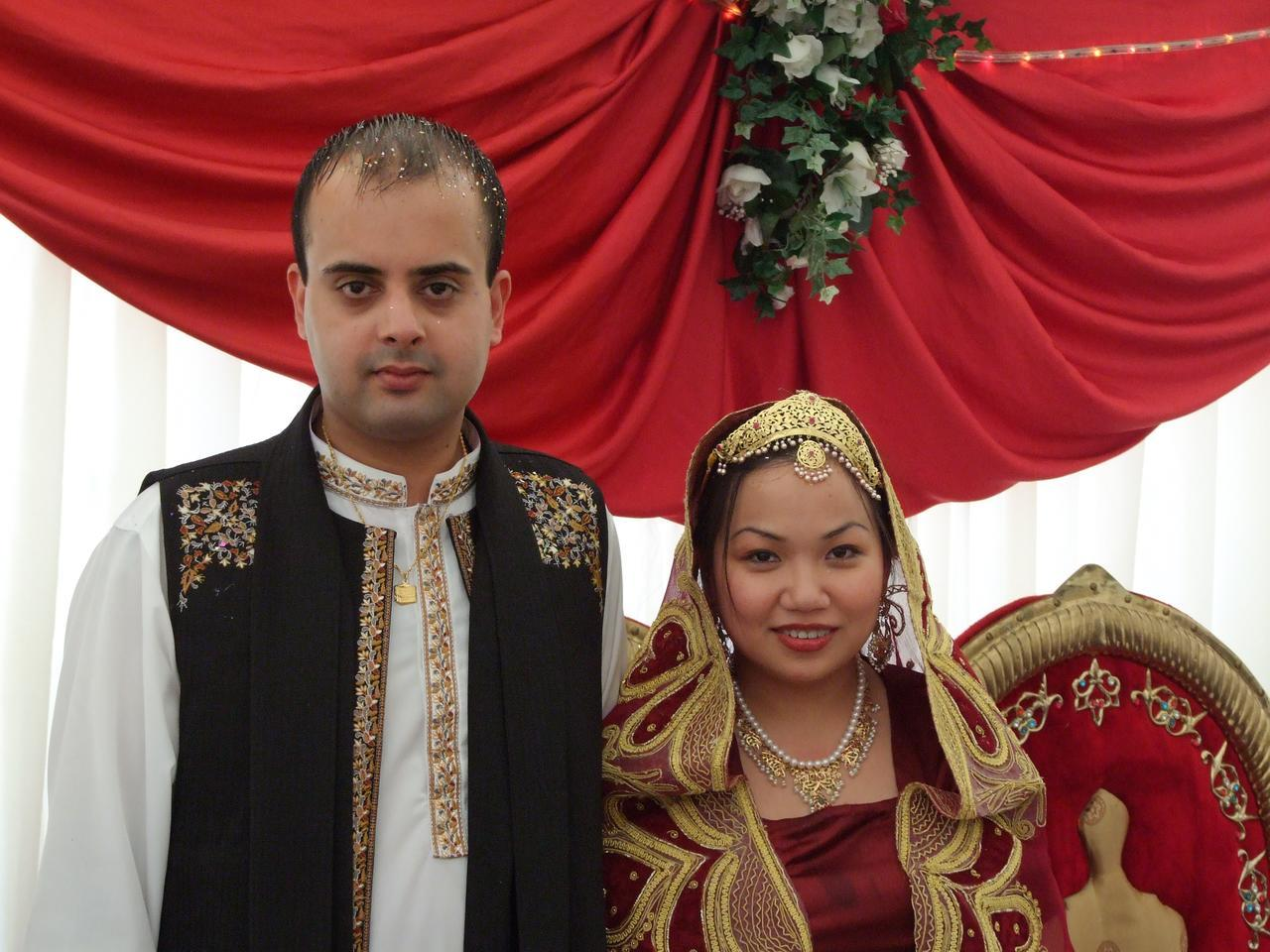
A Muslim couple in India at their wedding ceremony, also called a nikah

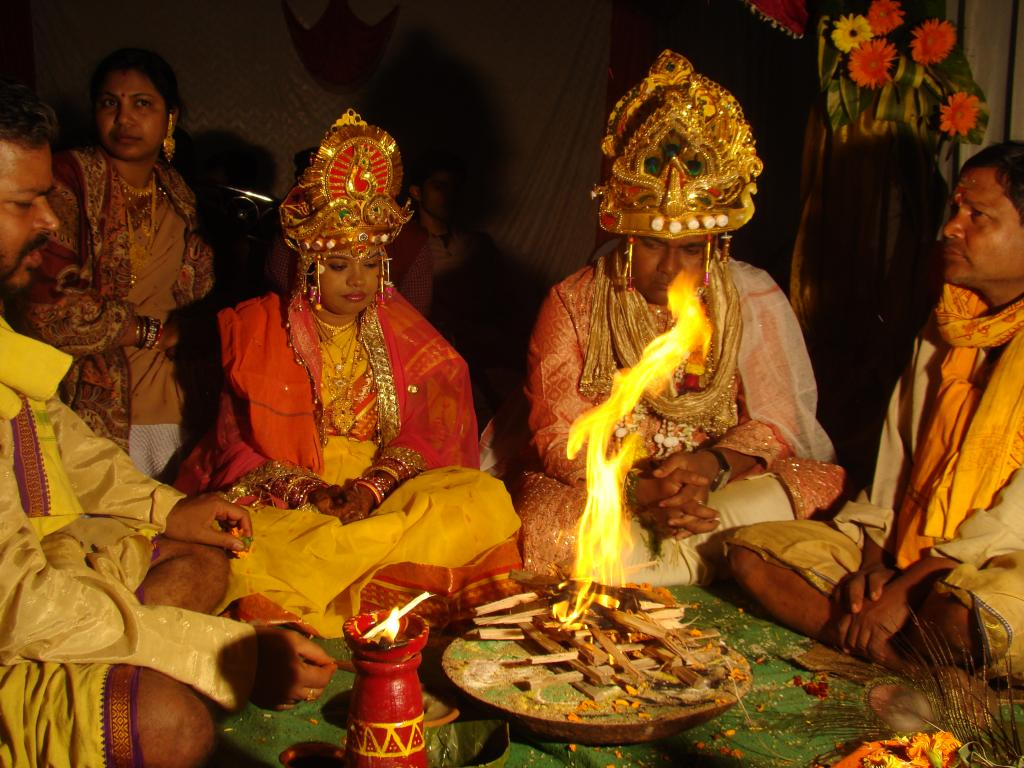
Fire rituals at a Hindu wedding in India

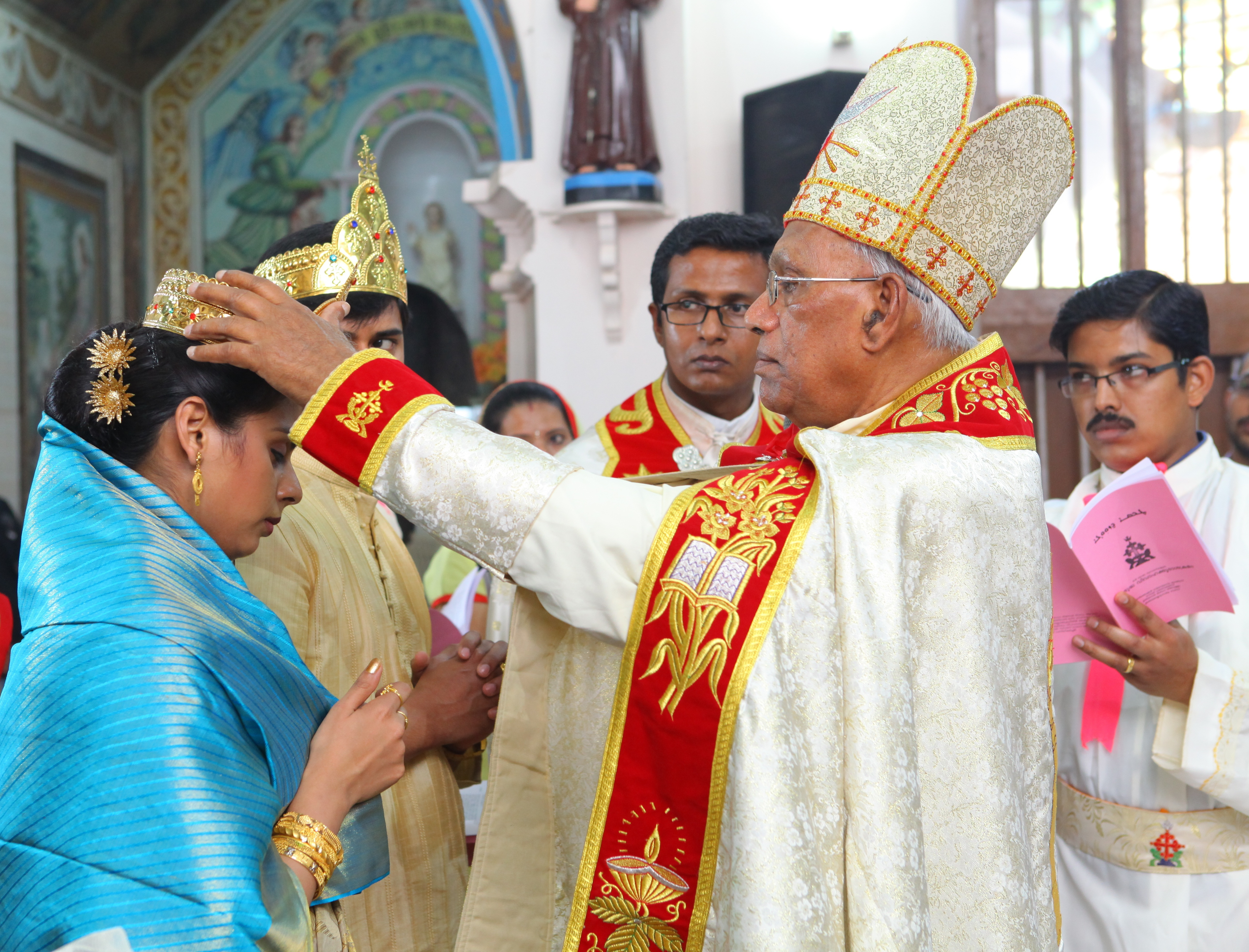
Crowning during a Nasrani wedding in the Syro-Malabar Catholic Church

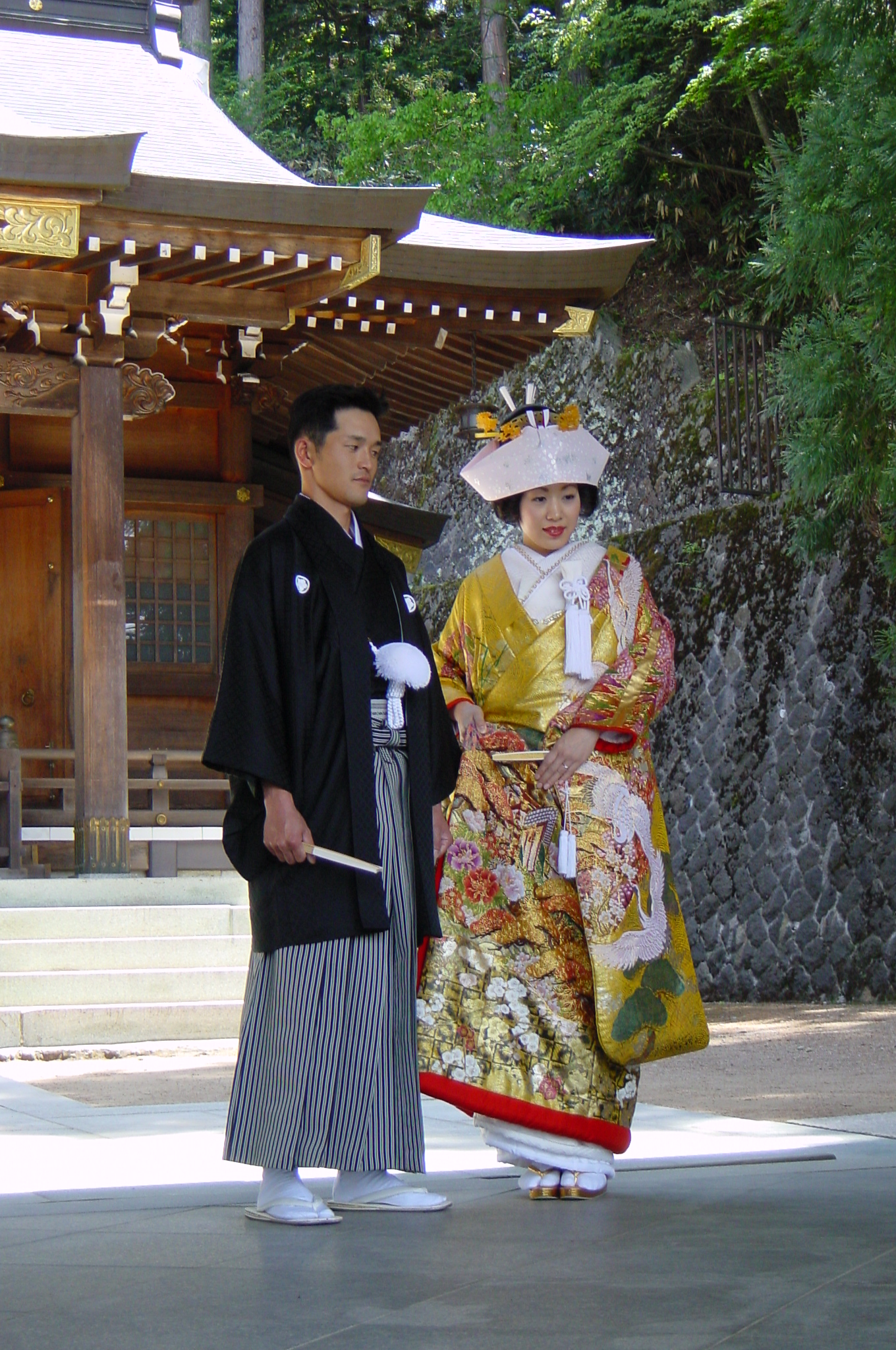
Japanese bride and bridegroom

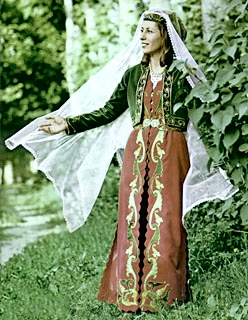
Traditional Armenian wedding dress

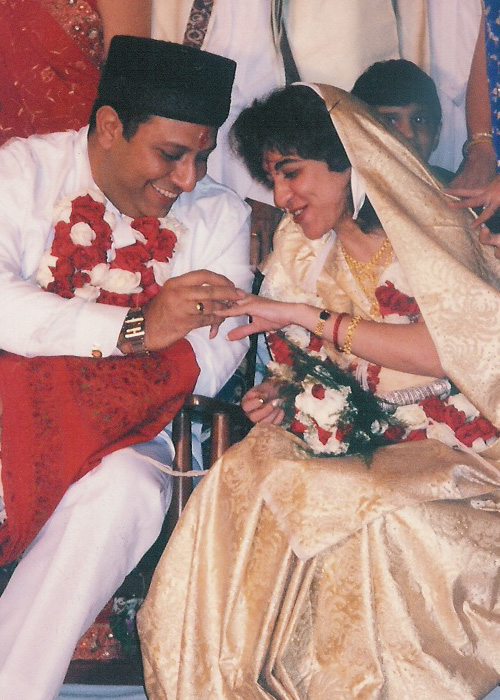
A Parsi wedding

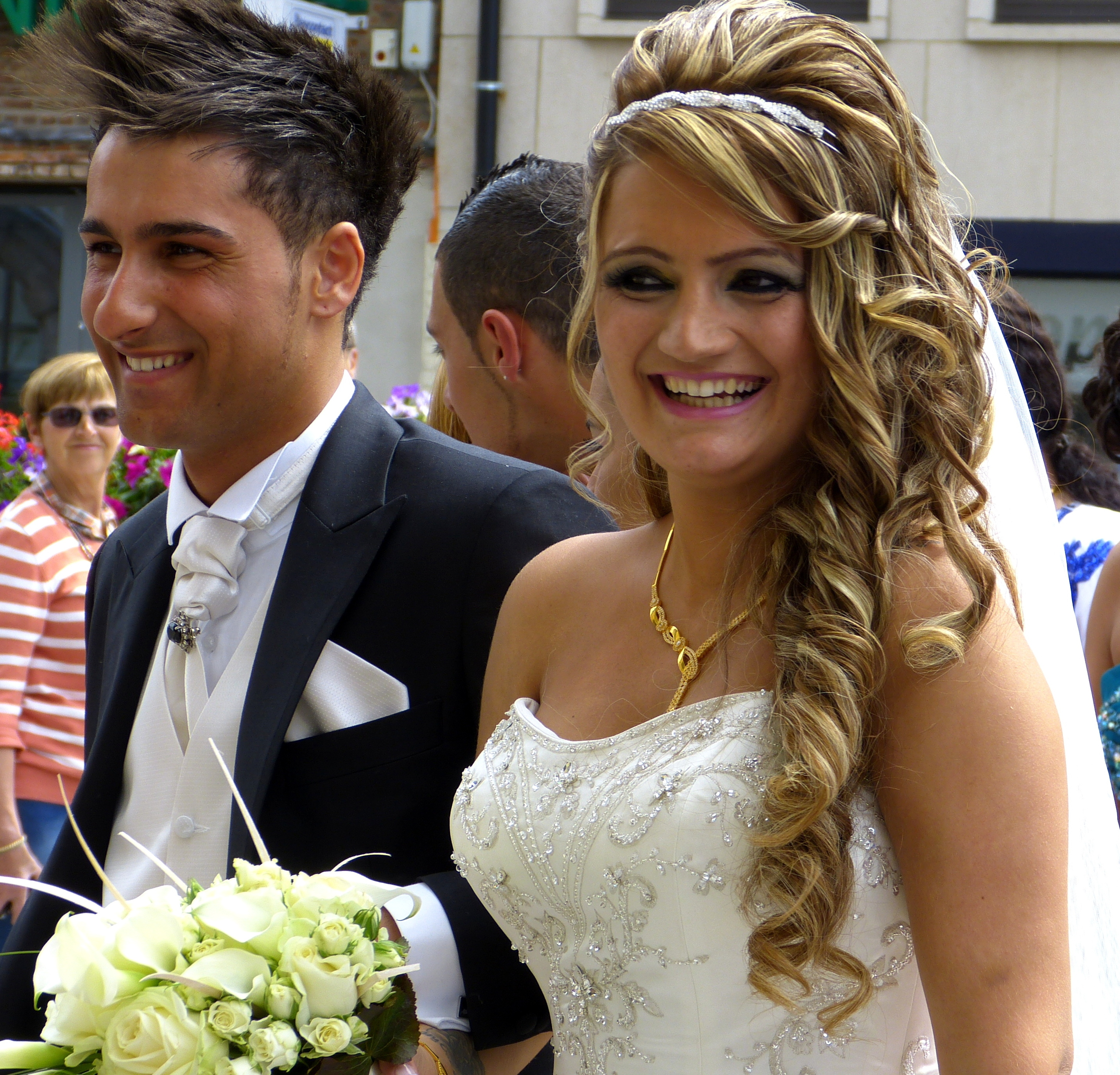
Assyrian bride and groom during a wedding celebration

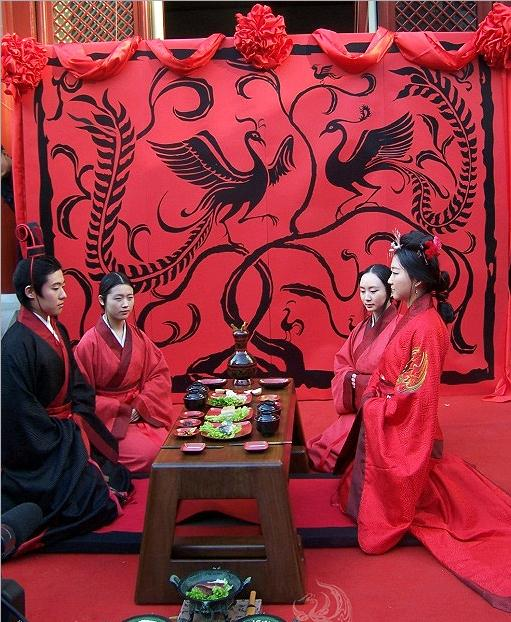
Chinese traditional wedding attire, Zhou dynasty style

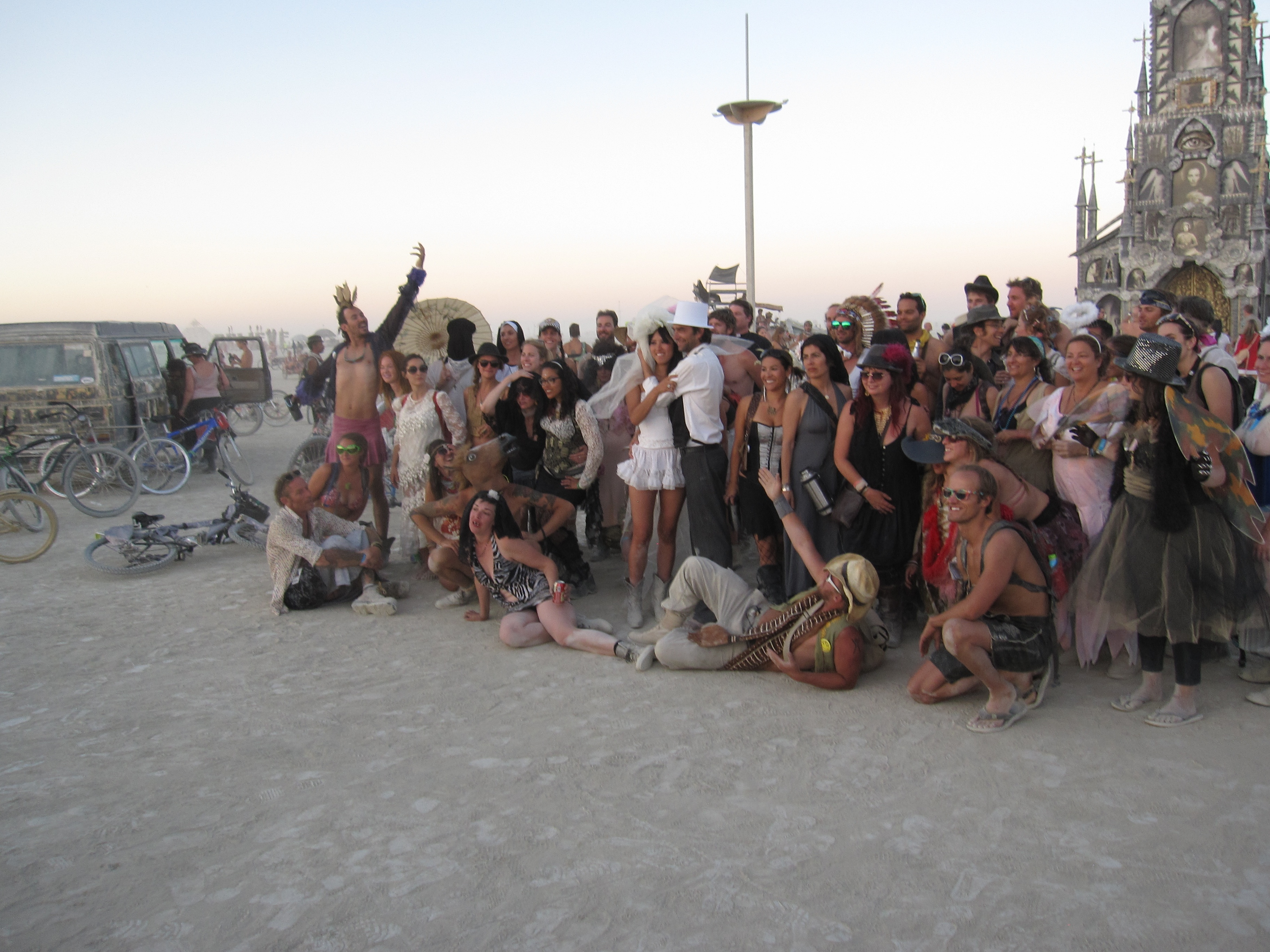
Wedding at Burning Man

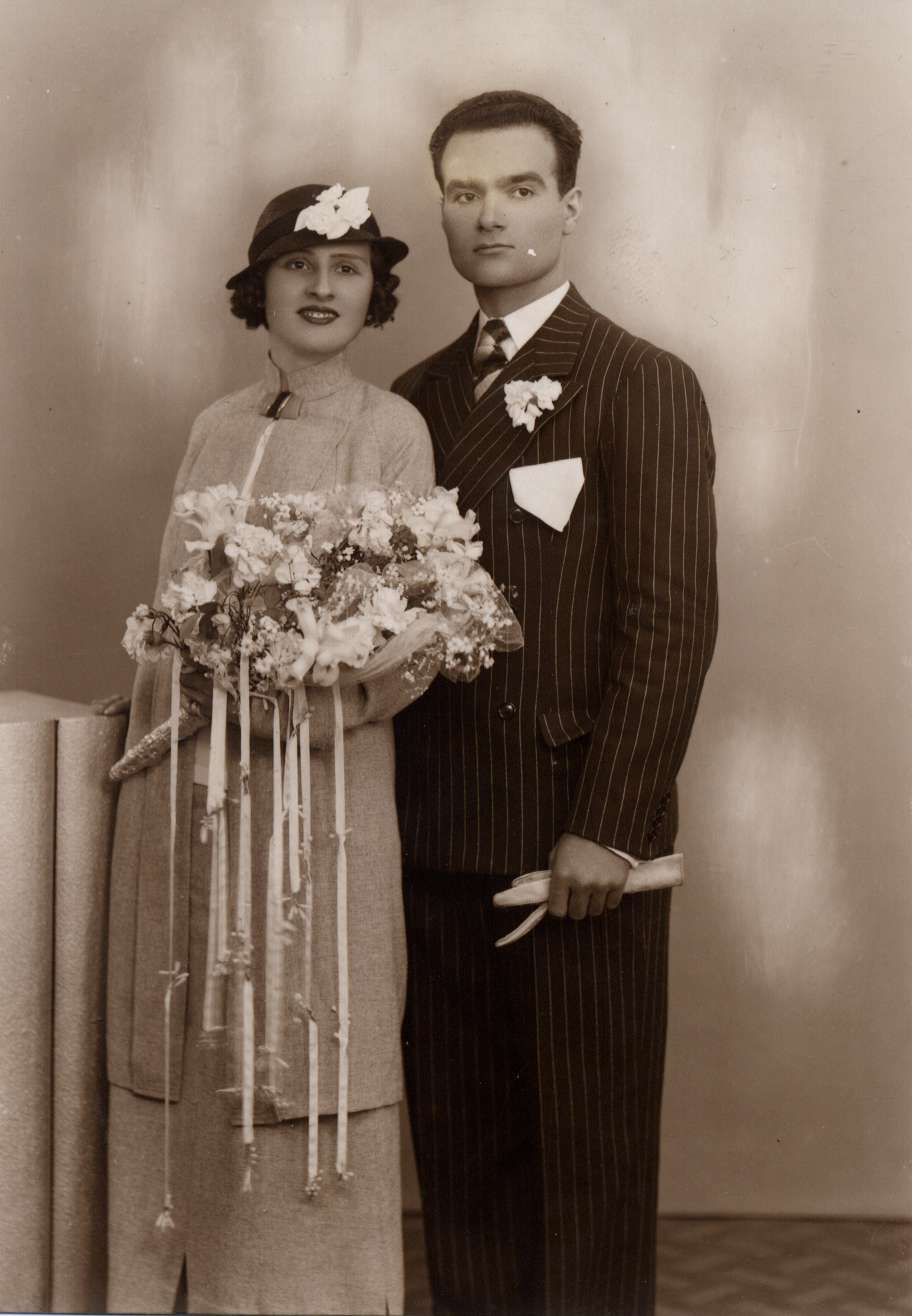
1935 wedding in Barcelona, Spain

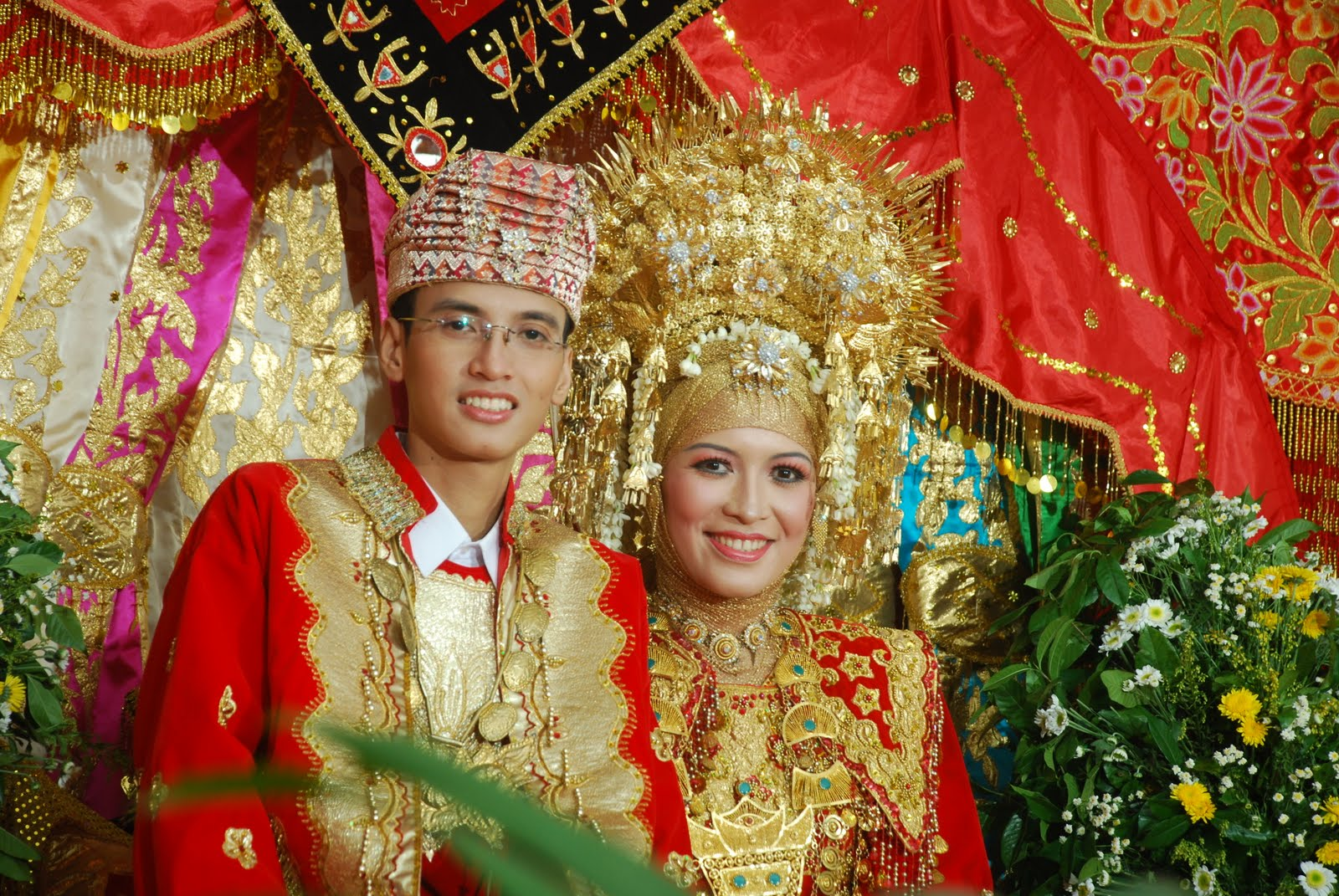
Minangkabau marriage in Indonesia

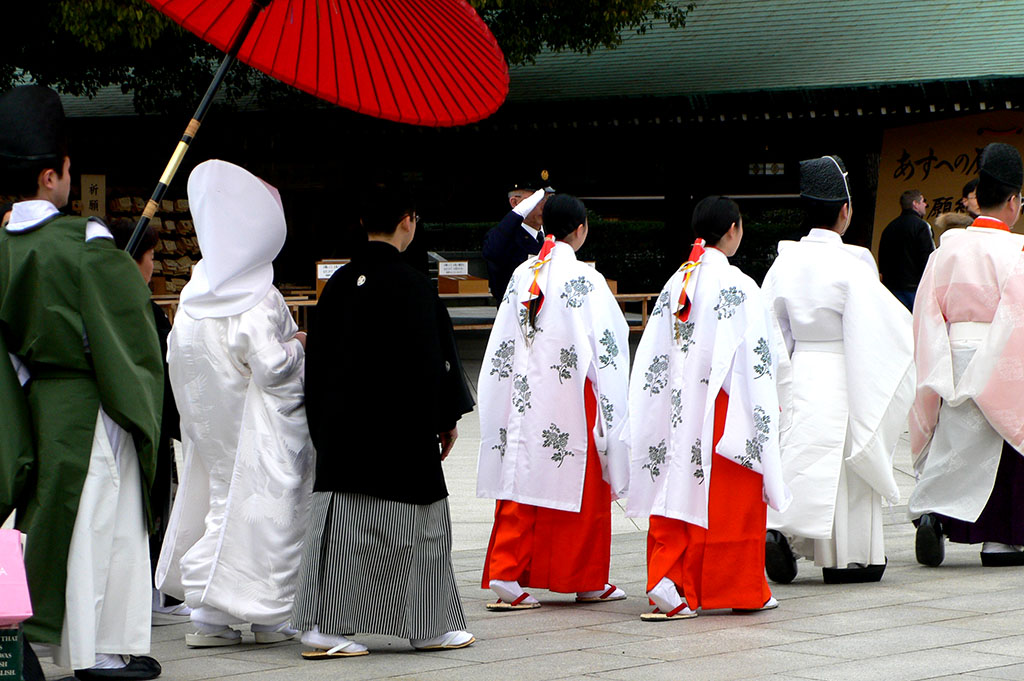
Japanese wedding at the Meiji Shrine

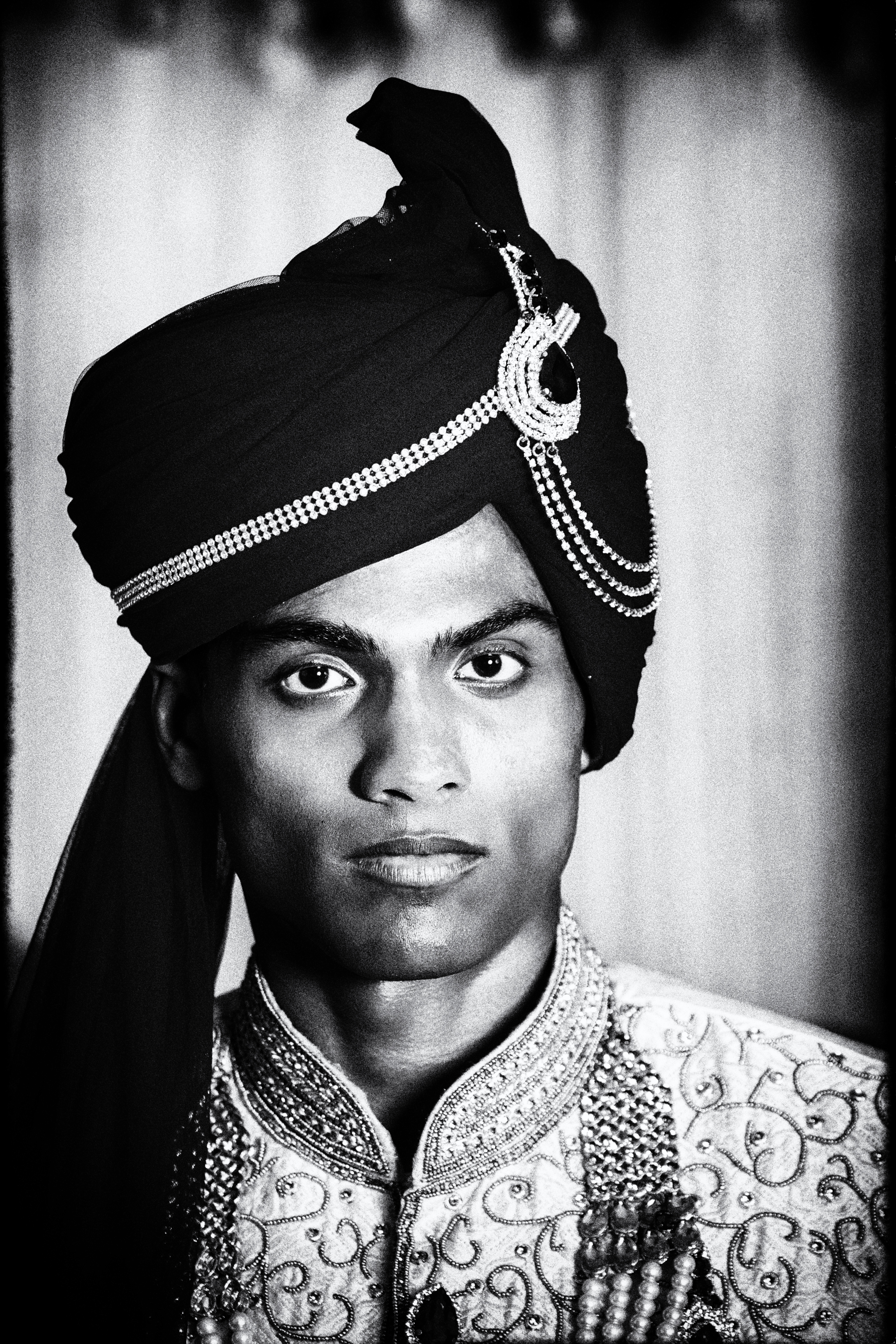
Groom in the traditional dress of Bangladesh in a wedding ceremony

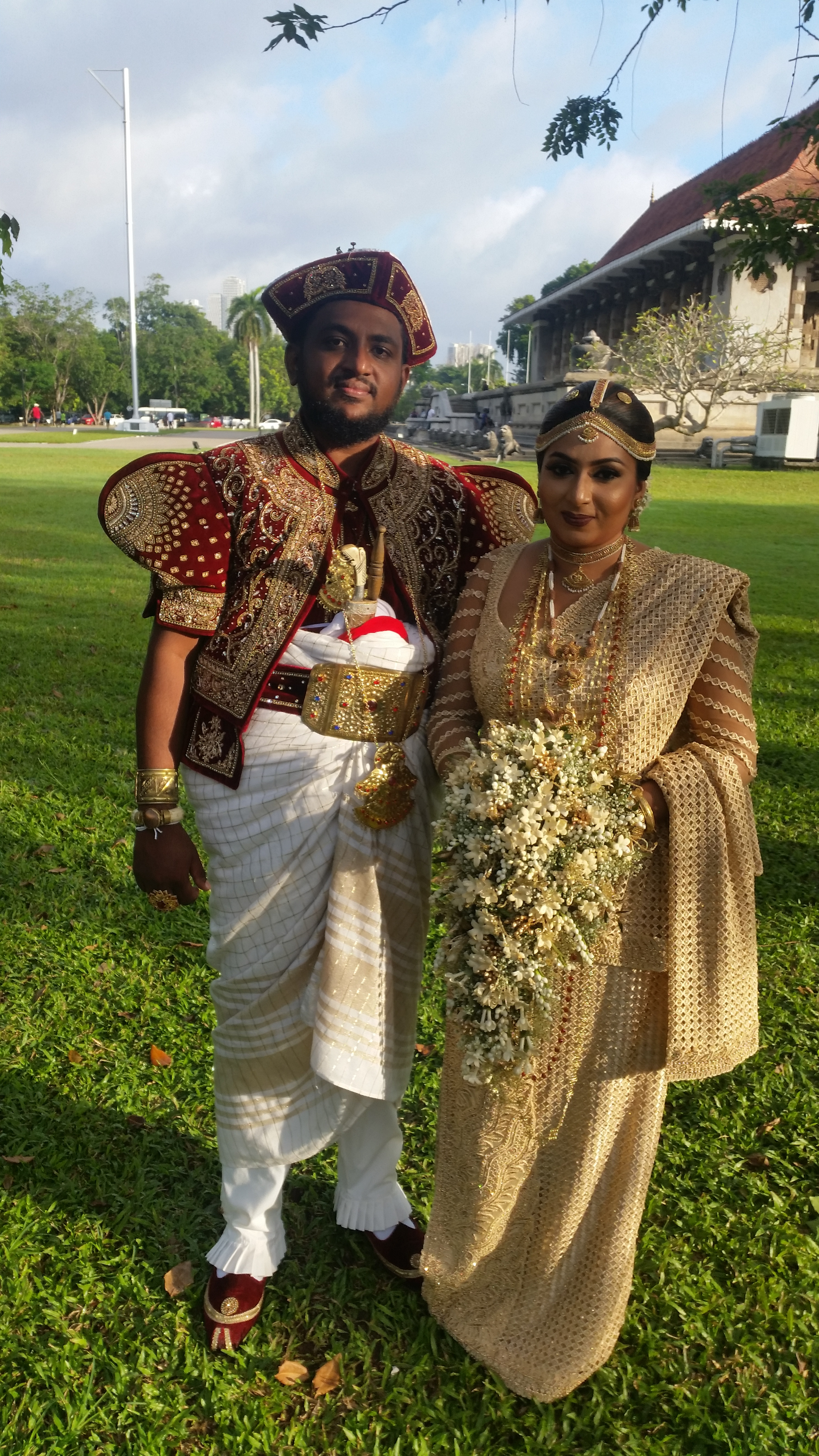
Sri Lankan Kandyan bride and groom

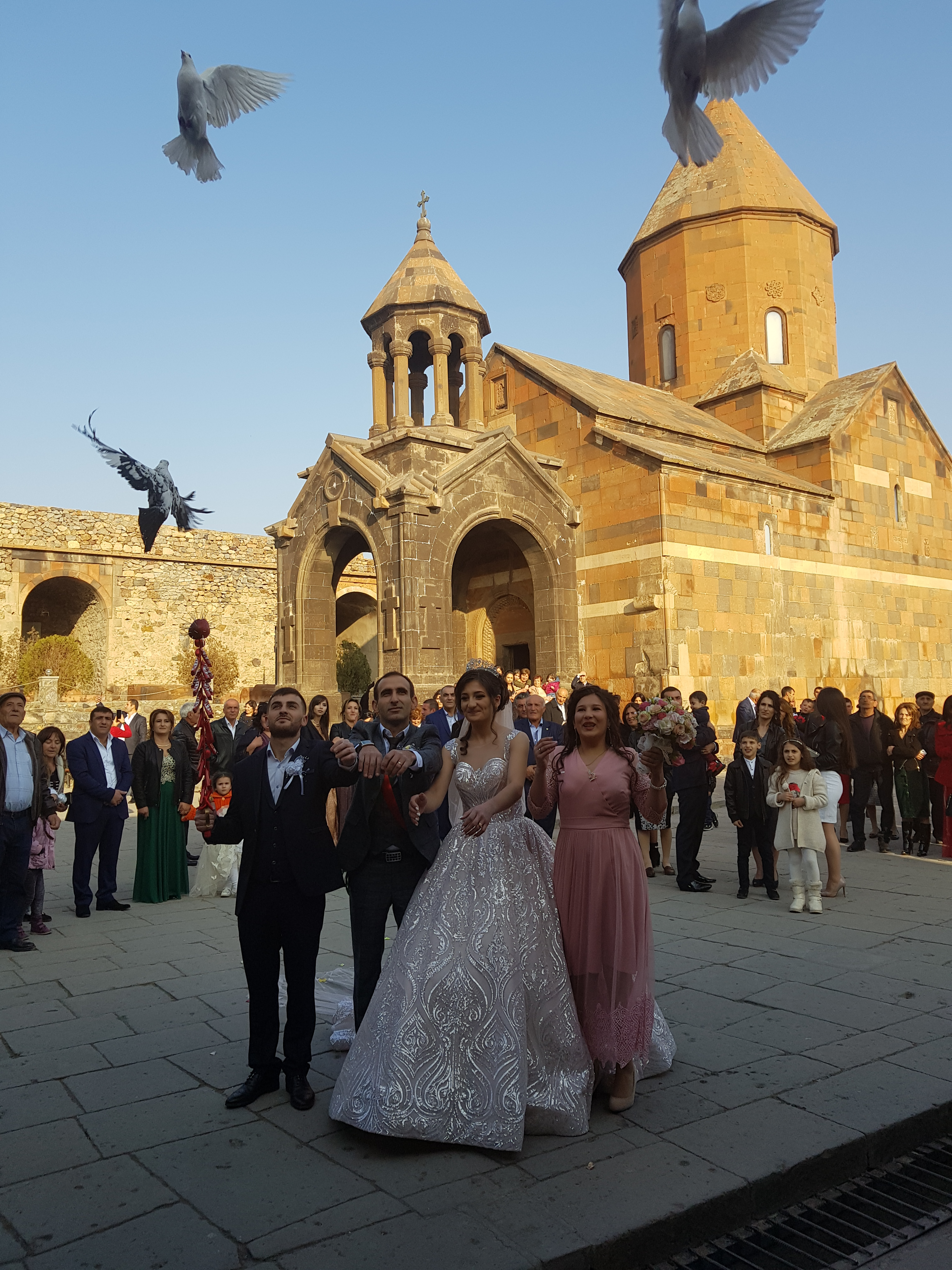
Armenian wedding at Khor Virap

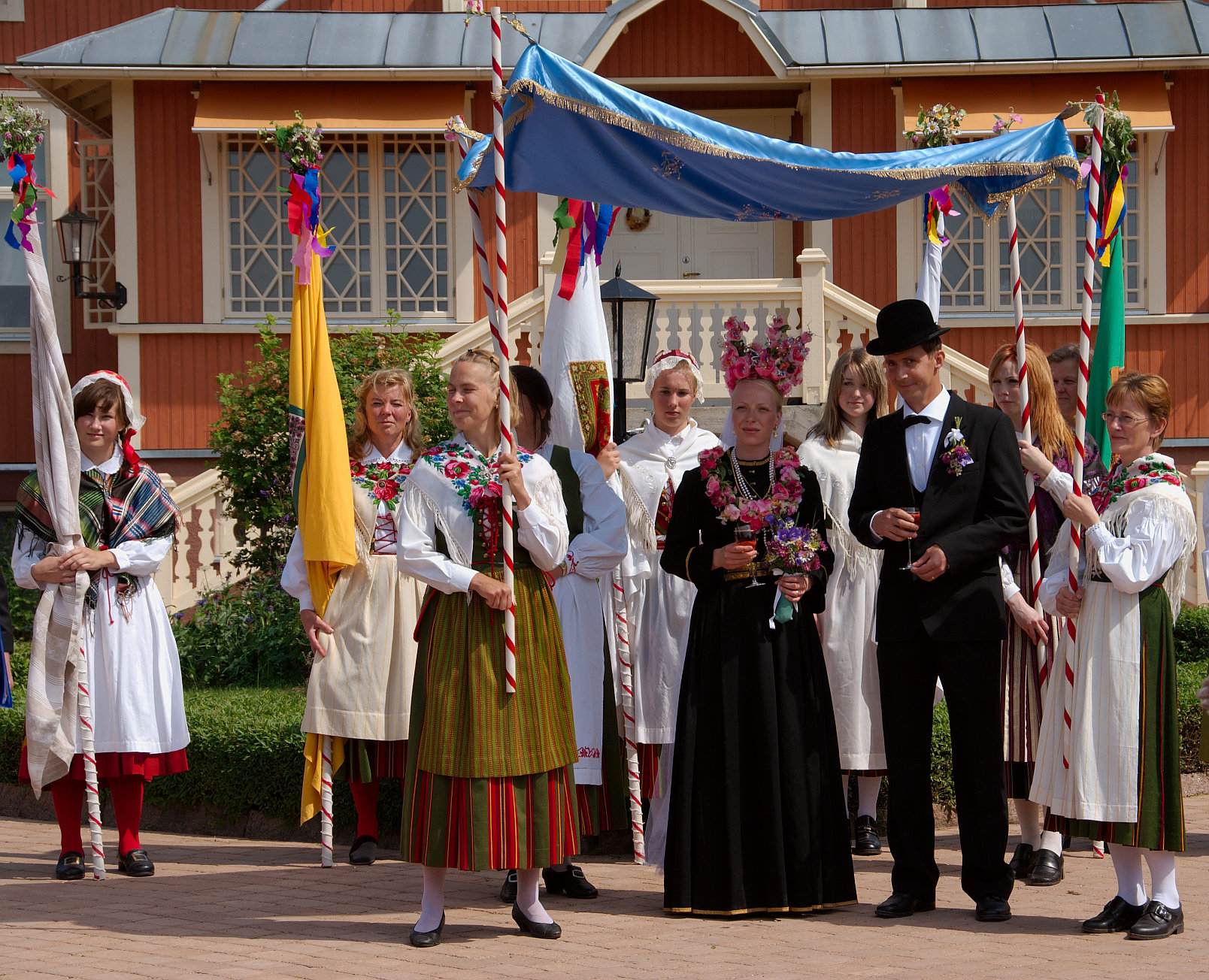
Traditional wedding ceremony in Jomala, Åland

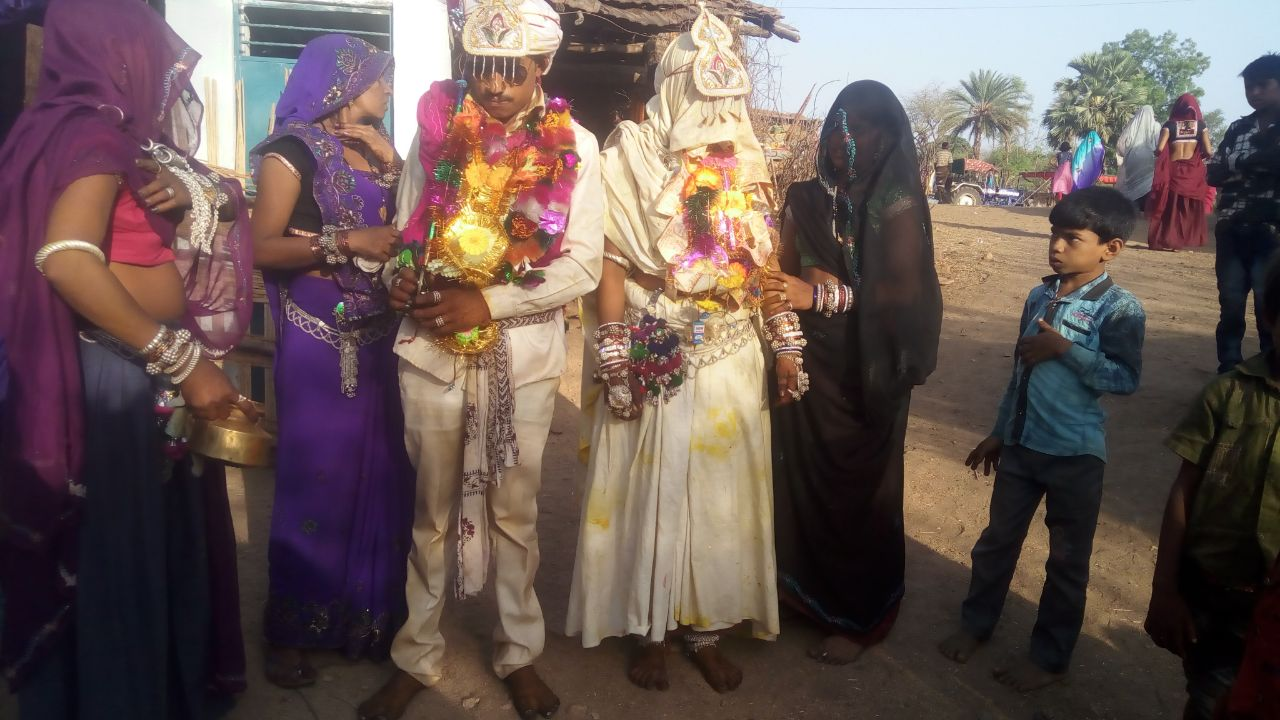
Hindu marriage conducted in the Adivasi tribes, India

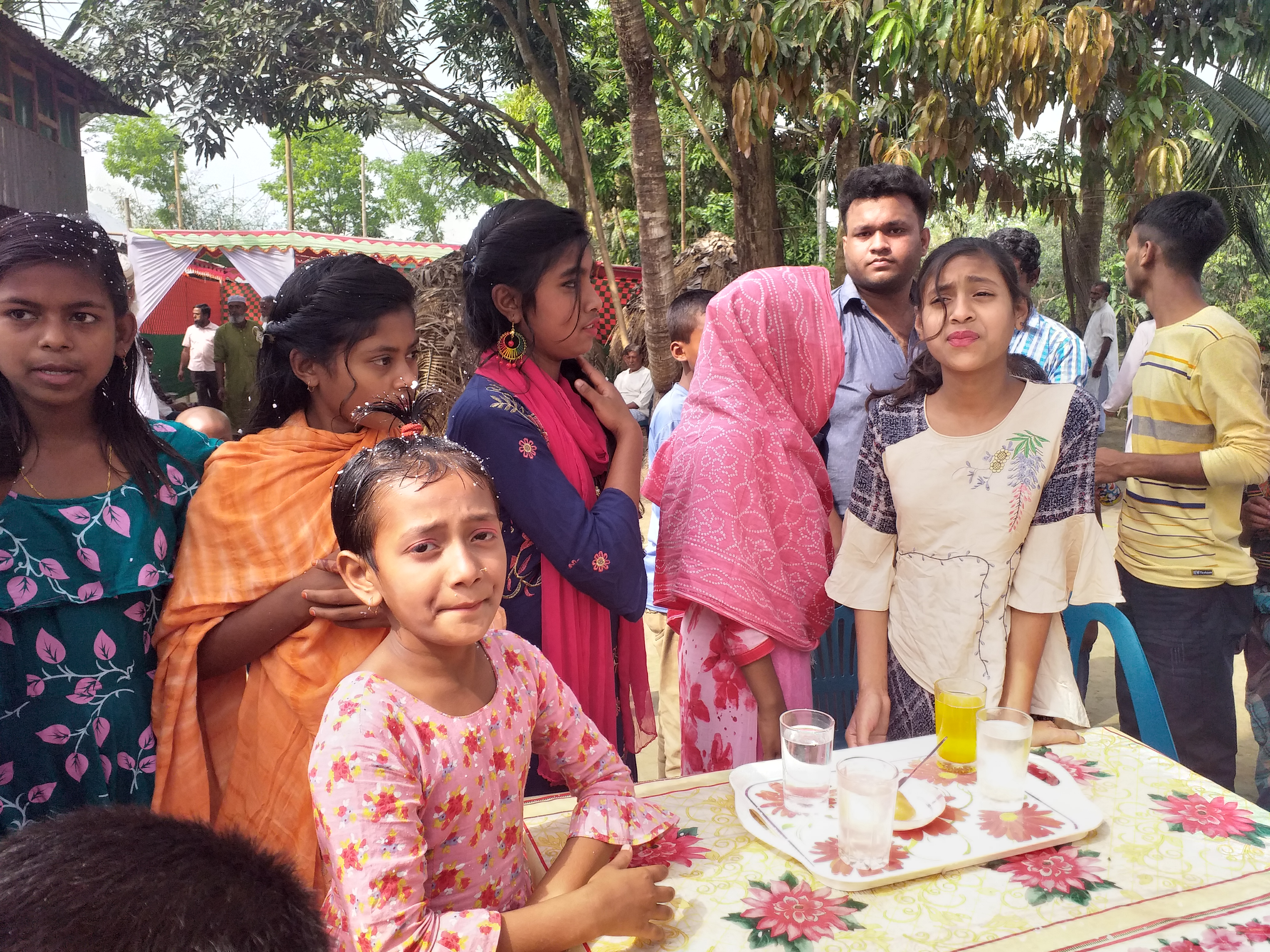
Attendees at a rural marriage ceremony in Mymensingh, Bangladesh

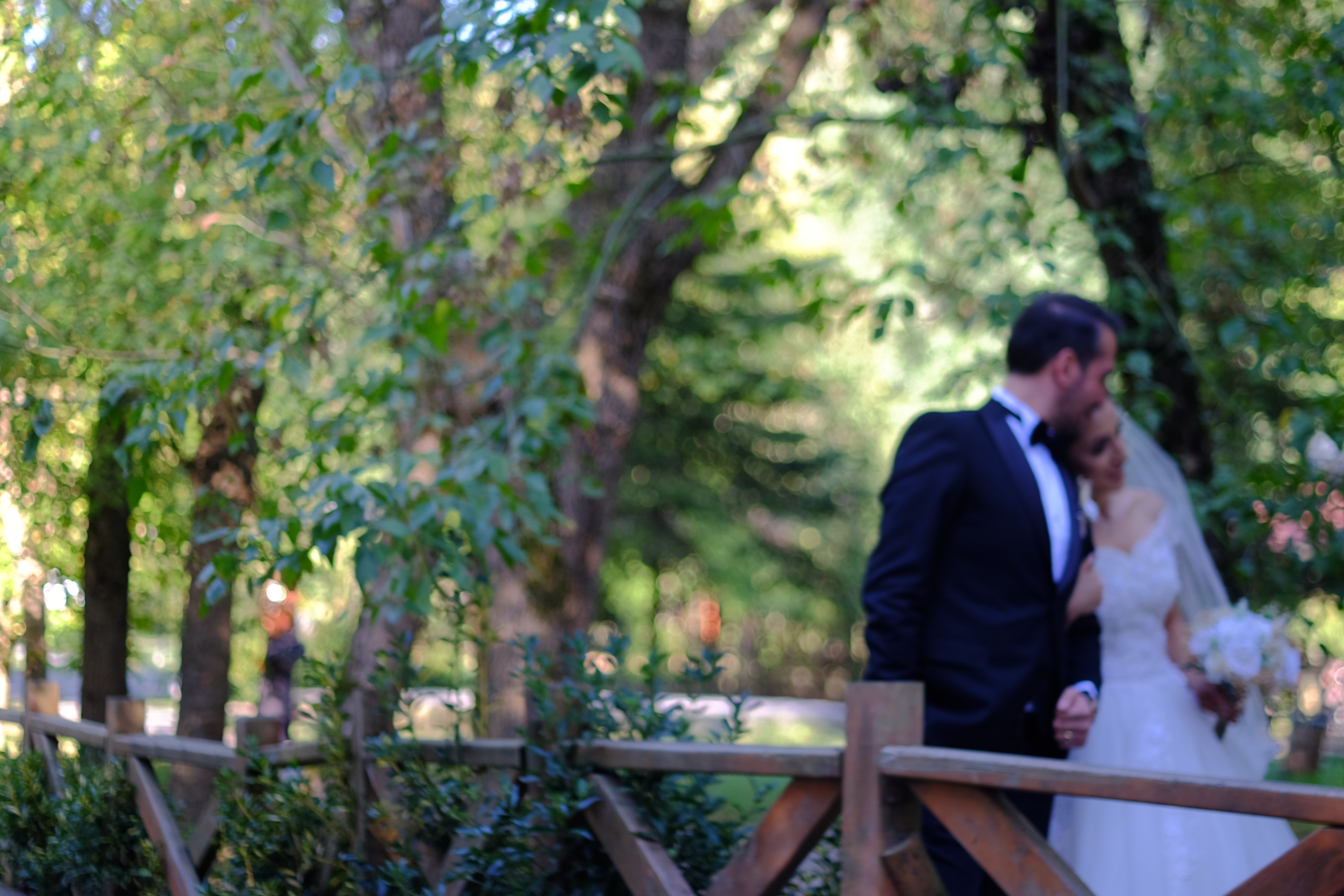
Wedding in Turkey

== Wedding music ==
Bridal march
The Bridal Chorus from Richard Wagner's opera Lohengrin

=== Western weddings ===
Music played at Western weddings includes a processional song (e.g., the Wedding March) for walking down the aisle, either before or after the marriage service. An example of such use is reported in the 1878 wedding of Nora Robinson and Alexander Kirkman Finlay.

The "Bridal Chorus" from Lohengrin by Richard Wagner, commonly known as "Here Comes the Bride", is often used as the processional. Wagner is said to have been anti-Semitic, and as a result, the Bridal Chorus is normally not used at Jewish weddings. UK law forbids music with any religious connotations to be used in a civil ceremony.

Johann Pachelbel's Canon in D is an alternative processional. Other alternatives include various contemporary melodies, such as Bob Marley's One Love, which is sometimes performed by a steel drum band. The music used in modern weddings is usually left completely up to the bride and groom, and it is becoming increasingly popular for couples to add their own twist to the song they walk down the aisle to. Many brides and grooms use songs that hold special value for them.

In the United States, approximately 2 million people get married each year, and close to 70 million people attend a wedding and spend more than $100 on a gift.

In the United Kingdom, according to a survey, the average minimum amount spent on a wedding gift is £24.70, and the average maximum amount spent is £111.46. Eighty-five percent of people said that they were more likely to spend more money on a person if they had a good relationship with them.

== Customs associated with various religions and cultures ==
=== Christian customs ===
An Evangelical-Lutheran priest makes the sign of the cross, along with the bride and groom being wed, during a Nuptial Mass in the Church of Sweden

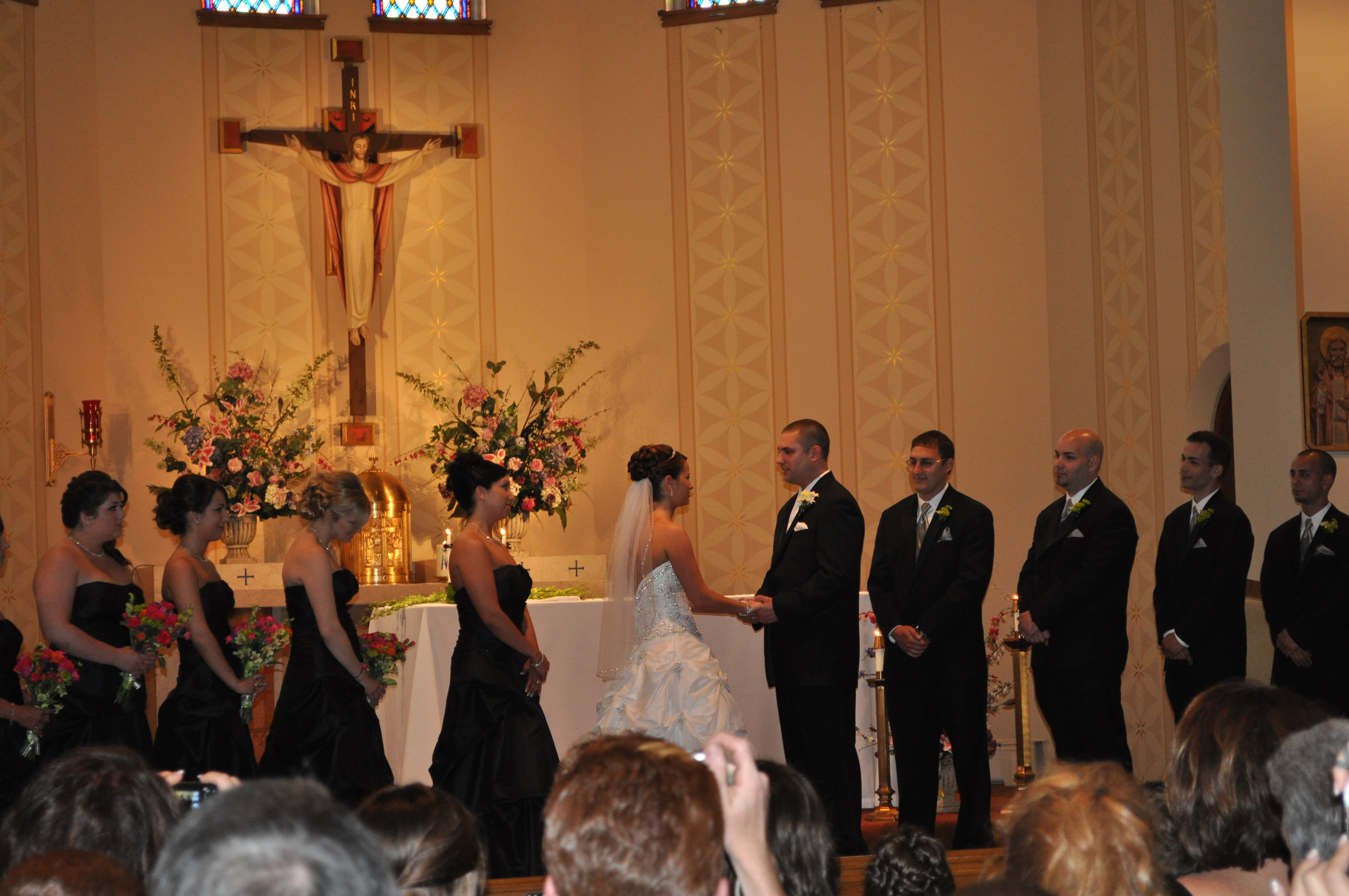
A couple exchange vows at the altar during a ceremony in a Catholic Church.

Most Christian churches give some form of blessing to a marriage, which is seen as a sacred institution in some sense, although terminology and associated theological meanings vary widely from one denomination to another (e.g., "holy matrimony", "sacrament of marriage", "holy ordinance of marriage", or "holy union").

A celebration of Holy Matrimony typically includes mutual vows or solemn promises of lifelong love and fidelity by the couple, and may include some sort of pledge by the community to support the couple's relationship. A church wedding is a ceremony held in a church and presided over by a Christian pastor. Traditionally, Christian weddings occur in a church, as Christian marriage ideally begins where one started their faith journey (Christians receive the sacrament of baptism in church in the presence of their congregation). Catholic Christian weddings must "take place in a church building", as holy matrimony is a sacrament; sacraments normatively occur in the presence of Christ in the house of God, and "members of the faith community [should be] present to witness the event and provide support and encouragement for those celebrating the sacrament." Bishops never grant permission "to those requesting to be married in a garden, on the beach, or some other place outside of the church" and a dispensation is only granted "in extraordinary circumstances (for example, if a bride or groom is ill or disabled and unable to come to the church)." Marriage in the church, for Christians, is seen as contributing to the fruit of the newlywed couple regularly attending church each Lord's Day and raising children in the faith.

Wedding ceremonies typically contain prayers and readings from the Holy Bible and reflect the church's teachings about the spiritual significance of marriage, as well as its purpose and obligations. The wedding service often includes the reception of Holy Communion, especially in the context of Mass (as with Catholicism, Lutheranism, and Anglicanism). In some traditional weddings of Western Christianity (especially Catholicism, Lutheranism and Anglicanism), a "care cloth" or "nuptial veil" (velatio nuptialis) "signifying a marriage yoke joining the bride and groom together" may be held over the kneeling couple during the nuptial blessing given by the priest.

Pre-marital counseling may be recommended or required for an engaged couple. In some Christian countries or denominations, a betrothal rite, as well as the reading of banns of marriage may also be required before the wedding date.

Emperor Pedro I of Brazil and Amélie of Leuchtenberg (step-granddaughter of Napoleon) married at Rio de Janeiro’s Imperial Chapel on October 16, 1829, in a Roman Catholic ceremony.

In the Roman Catholic Church, Holy Matrimony is considered to be one of the seven sacraments, in this case, one that the spouses bestow upon each other in front of a priest and members of the community as witnesses. As with all sacraments, it is seen as having been instituted by Jesus himself (see Gospel of Matthew 19:1–2, Catechism of the Catholic Church §1614–1615). The Second Vatican Council's Constitution on the Sacred Liturgy noted that there can be a place for appropriate "customs and ceremonies" to be incorporated into a Catholic marriage service.

In the Eastern Orthodox Church, it is one of the Mysteries and is seen as an ordination and a martyrdom. The Christian wedding ceremony of Saint Thomas Christians, an ethnoreligious group of Christians in India, incorporates elements from local Indian traditions. Protestant weddings may be elaborate (as with Lutheranism and Anglicanism) or simple (as with Baptists). For example, in the United Methodist Church, the Service of Christian Marriage (Rite I) includes the elements found in a typical Sunday service, such as hymns, prayers, and readings from the Bible, as well as other elements unique to a wedding, including taking marriage vows and an optional exchange of wedding rings, as well as a special benediction for the couple. Holy Communion may be part of the wedding service in liturgical Protestant churches (e.g., Lutheran, Anglican, or Methodist), but is rarely, if ever, found in weddings of other low-church Protestant denominations (e.g., Baptists).

A Quaker wedding ceremony in a Friends meeting is similar to any other meeting for worship, and therefore often very different from the experience expected by non-Friends.

In some Western countries, a separate and secular civil wedding ceremony is required for recognition by the state, while in other Western countries, couples must merely obtain a marriage license from a local government authority and can be married by Christian or other clergy authorized by law to do so.

Since the beginning of the 21st century, same-sex couples have been allowed to marry civilly in many countries, and some Christian churches in those countries allow religious marriages of same-sex couples, though some forbid them. See the article Same-sex marriage.

=== Hindu customs ===
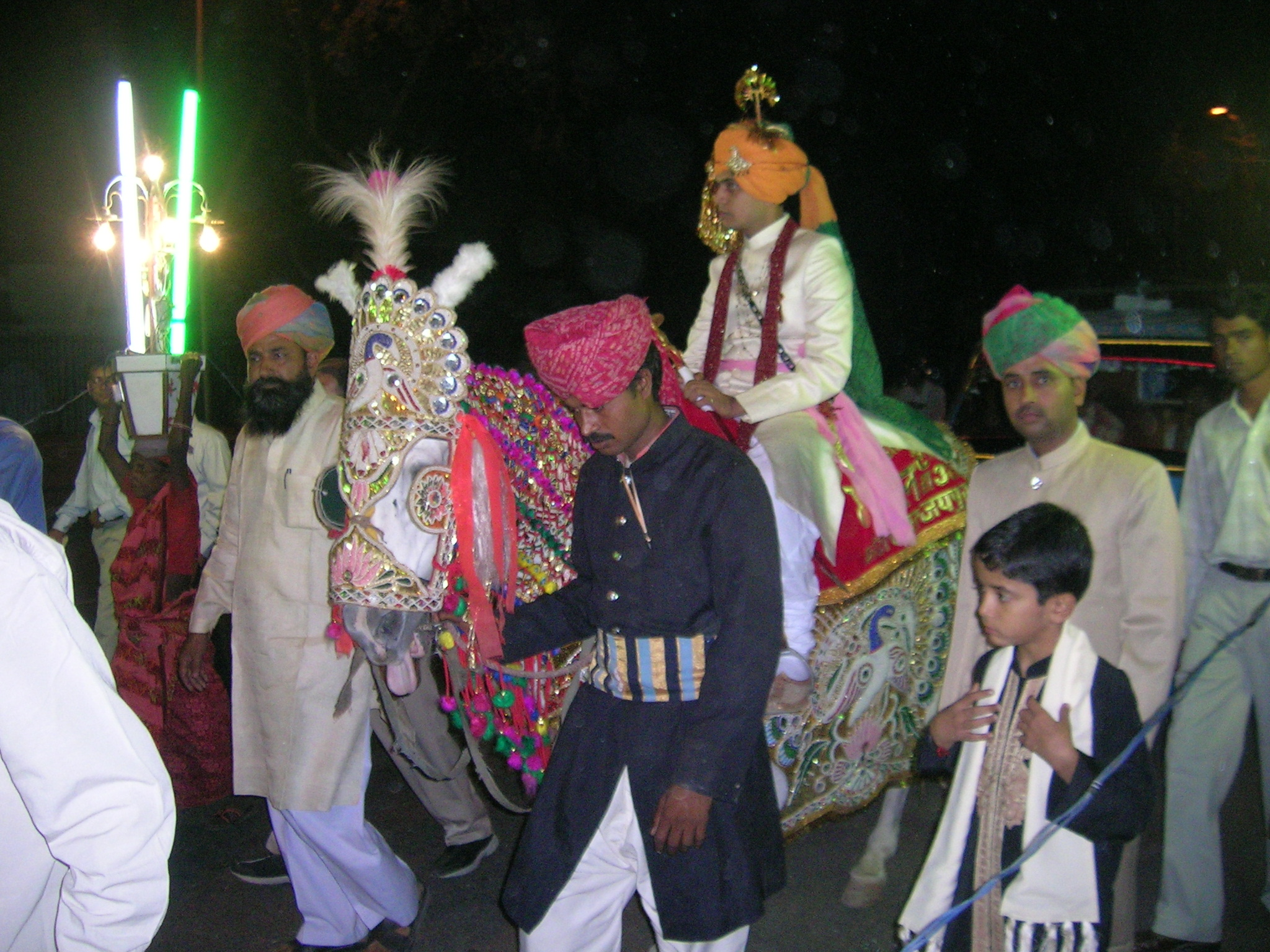
Bridegroom arrives on horseback at a Rajput wedding.

Hindu ceremonies are usually conducted totally or at least partially in Sanskrit, the language of the Hindu scriptures. The wedding celebrations may last for several days and they can be extremely diverse, depending upon the region, denomination, and community. Mehendi ceremony is a traditional ritual in Hindu weddings, where Henna application takes place on the bride's hands and legs, before the wedding. On the wedding day, the bride and the bridegroom garland each other in front of the guests. Most guests witness only this short ceremony and then socialize, have food, and leave. The religious part (if applicable) comes hours later, witnessed by close friends and relatives. In cases where a religious ceremony is present, a Brahmin (Hindu priest) arranges a sacred yajna (fire-sacrifice), and the sacred fire (Agni) is considered the prime witness (sākshī) of the marriage. He chants mantras from the Vedas and subsidiary texts while the couple is seated before the fire. The most important step is saptapadi or saat phere, wherein the bride and the groom, hand-in-hand, encircle the sacred fire seven times, each circle representing a matrimonial vow. Then the groom marks the bride's hair parting with vermilion (sindoor) and puts a gold necklace (mangalsutra) around her neck. Or a yellow thread applied with turmeric is knotted around the bride's neck 3 times at marriage. The first knot represents her obedience and respect to her husband, the second one to his parents and the third represents her respect to God. Several other rituals may precede or follow these afore-mentioned rites. Then the bride formally departs from her blood-relatives to join the groom's family.

=== Jewish customs ===
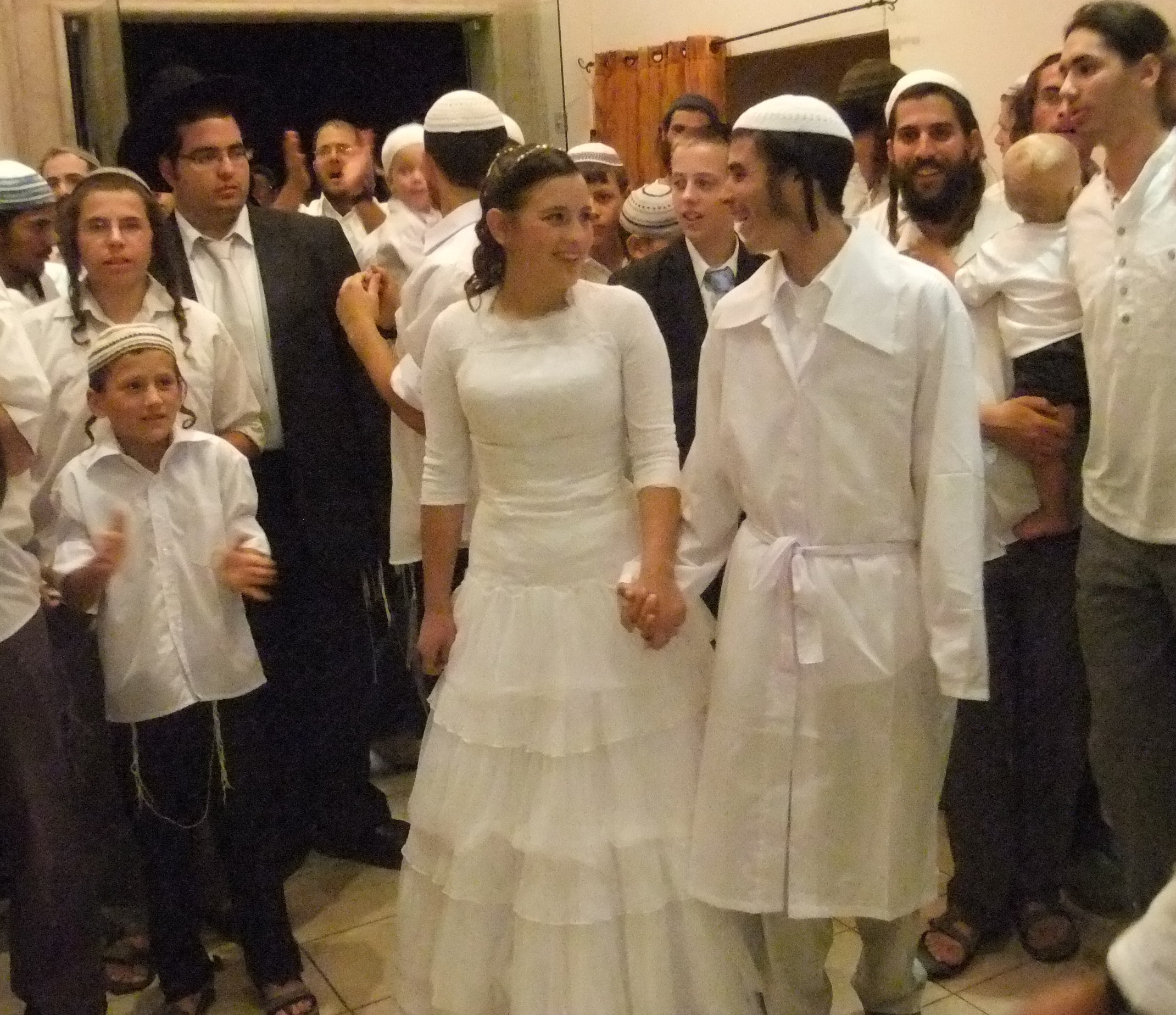
Jewish wedding

A traditional Jewish wedding usually follows this format:

- Before the ceremony, the couple formalize a written ketubah (marriage contract), specifying the obligations of husband to the wife and contingencies in case of divorce. The ketubah is signed by two witnesses and later read under the chuppah (wedding canopy).
- The couple is married under the chuppah signifying their new home together. The chuppah can be made from a piece of cloth or other material attached to four poles, or a giant tallit (prayer shawl) held over the couple by four family members or friends.
- The wedding couple is accompanied by both sets of parents and they join the wedding couple under the chuppah.
  - In some Orthodox Jewish weddings, the bride is accompanied to the chuppah by both mothers, and the groom is accompanied to the chuppah by both fathers.
- Seven blessings are recited, blessing the bride and groom and their new home.
- The couple sip a glass of wine from a Kiddush cup.
- The groom will smash a wine glass with his right foot, ostensibly in remembrance of the destruction of the Second Temple. The shattered cup also symbolizes the 'broken' world, and the lifelong process of finding the pieces and putting them back together.
  - In Reform Jewish weddings, the bride and groom can smash the wine glass together.
- At some weddings, the couple may declare that each is sanctified to the other, repeat other vows and exchange rings.
  - In Orthodox Jewish weddings, the bride does not speak under the chuppah and only she receives a ring. The groom recites "Harei at mekudeshet li k'dat Moshe V'Yisrael"- "behold you are [thus] sanctified to me by the law of Moses and Israel" as he places the ring on the bride's right index finger. The bride's silence and acceptance of the ring signify her agreement to the marriage. This part of the ceremony is called kiddushin. The groom's giving an object of value to the bride is necessary for the wedding to be valid.
  - In more egalitarian weddings, the bride responds verbally, often giving the groom a ring in return. A common response is "ani l'dodi, v'dodi li" (I am my beloved's, my beloved is mine)
- In some Orthodox weddings, the groom then says:

"If I forget you, O Jerusalem, may my right hand forget its skill.
May my tongue cling to the roof of my mouth.
If I do not remember you,
if I do not consider Jerusalem in my highest joy."

- The ceremony ends with the groom breaking a glass underfoot.
- The couple spend their first moments as husband and wife in seclusion (apart from the wedding guests, and with no other person present). This cheder yichud – "the room of seclusion (or 'oneness')" halachically strengthens the marriage bond since Orthodox Jews are forbidden to be secluded with an unrelated person of the opposite sex.
- The ceremony is followed by a seudat mitzvah, the wedding meal, as well as music and dancing.
- At the conclusion of the wedding meal, Birkat Hamazon (Grace After Meals) is recited, as well as the seven wedding blessings.

In more observant communities, the couple will celebrate for seven more days, called the Sheva Brachot (seven blessings) during which the seven wedding blessings are recited at every large gathering during this time.

=== Buddhist customs ===
Korean bride's robe

A wedding in Buddhist cultures is generally a joyful family celebration marked by local customs and traditions rather than a single standardized religious rite. Because Buddhism spread across South Asia, Southeast Asia, East Asia, and Tibet, wedding customs vary widely depending on region and culture.

In many Theravāda Buddhist countries such as Sri Lanka, Thailand, Myanmar, Cambodia, and Laos, weddings are primarily civil or traditional ceremonies. Couples often visit a temple either before or after the ceremony to receive blessings from monks. Monks chant protective verses (paritta), sprinkle holy water, and offer guidance on harmonious married life, but they do not officiate the legal marriage itself. Customs in these regions commonly include offering food and alms to monks for merit-making, performing water-pouring rituals symbolizing unity, tying sacred threads around the couple’s wrists, and hosting family feasts and community celebrations.

In Mahāyāna-influenced cultures such as China, Korea, Japan, and Vietnam, weddings may incorporate ancestral rites, incense offerings, and tea ceremonies. Couples may bow before a Buddha image to express respect and seek blessings, while the legal marriage is conducted separately under civil law.

In Tibetan Buddhist communities, weddings are involved with astrological consultations to determine auspicious dates, the exchange of ceremonial scarves (khata), traditional attire, and communal feasting.

Across Buddhist cultures, marriage is regarded as a partnership based on mutual respect, loving-kindness (mettā/maitrī), compassion (karuṇā), and shared moral responsibility. The Sigalovada Sutta outlines reciprocal duties between spouses, emphasizing faithfulness, care, and cooperation.

=== Islamic customs ===
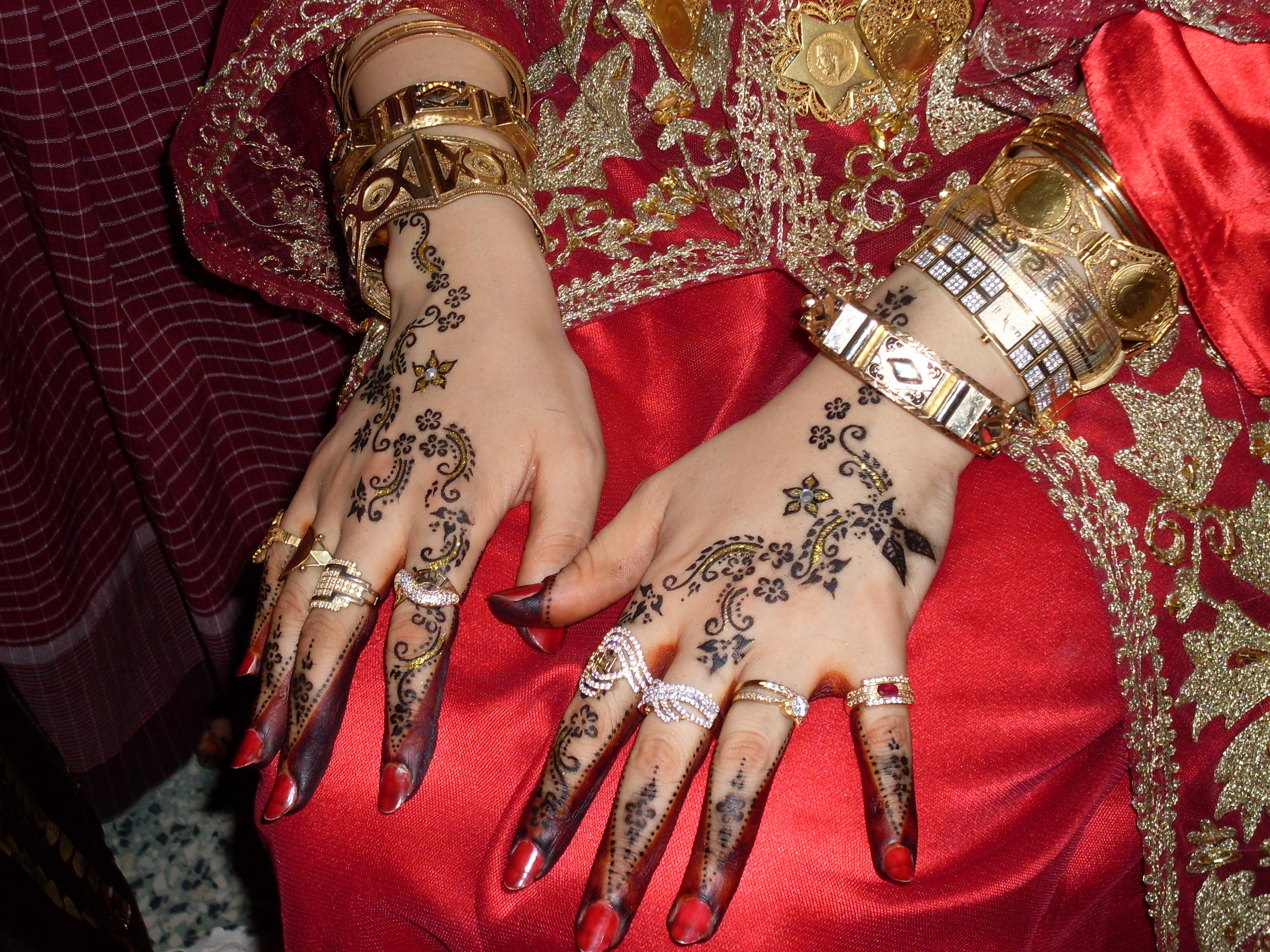
Henna on the hands of a bride in Tunisia

A wedding is typically a happy time for families to celebrate. In the Middle East, there are colorful, cultural variations from place to place.

Two witnesses are required for Nikah. According to the Quran, in a married Muslim couple, both husband and wife act as each other's protector and comforter and therefore only meant "for each other".

All Muslim marriages have to be declared publicly and are never to be undertaken in secret. For many Muslims, it is the ceremony that counts as the actual wedding alongside a confirmation of that wedding in a registry office according to fiqh. In Islam a wedding is also viewed as a legal contract particularly in Islamic jurisprudences. However, most Muslim cultures separate both the institutions of the mosque and marriage; no religious official is necessary, but very often an Imam presides and performs the ceremony, he may deliver a short sermon. Celebrations may differ from country to country depending on their culture but the main ceremony is followed by a Walima (the marriage banquet).

In Islam, polygyny is allowed with certain religious restrictions. Despite that, an overwhelming majority of Muslims traditionally practice monogamy.

It is forbidden in Islam for parents or anyone else: to force, coerce, or trick either man or woman into a marriage that is contrary to the individual will of any one of the couples. It is also necessary for all marriages to commence with the best of intentions.

=== Chinese customs ===
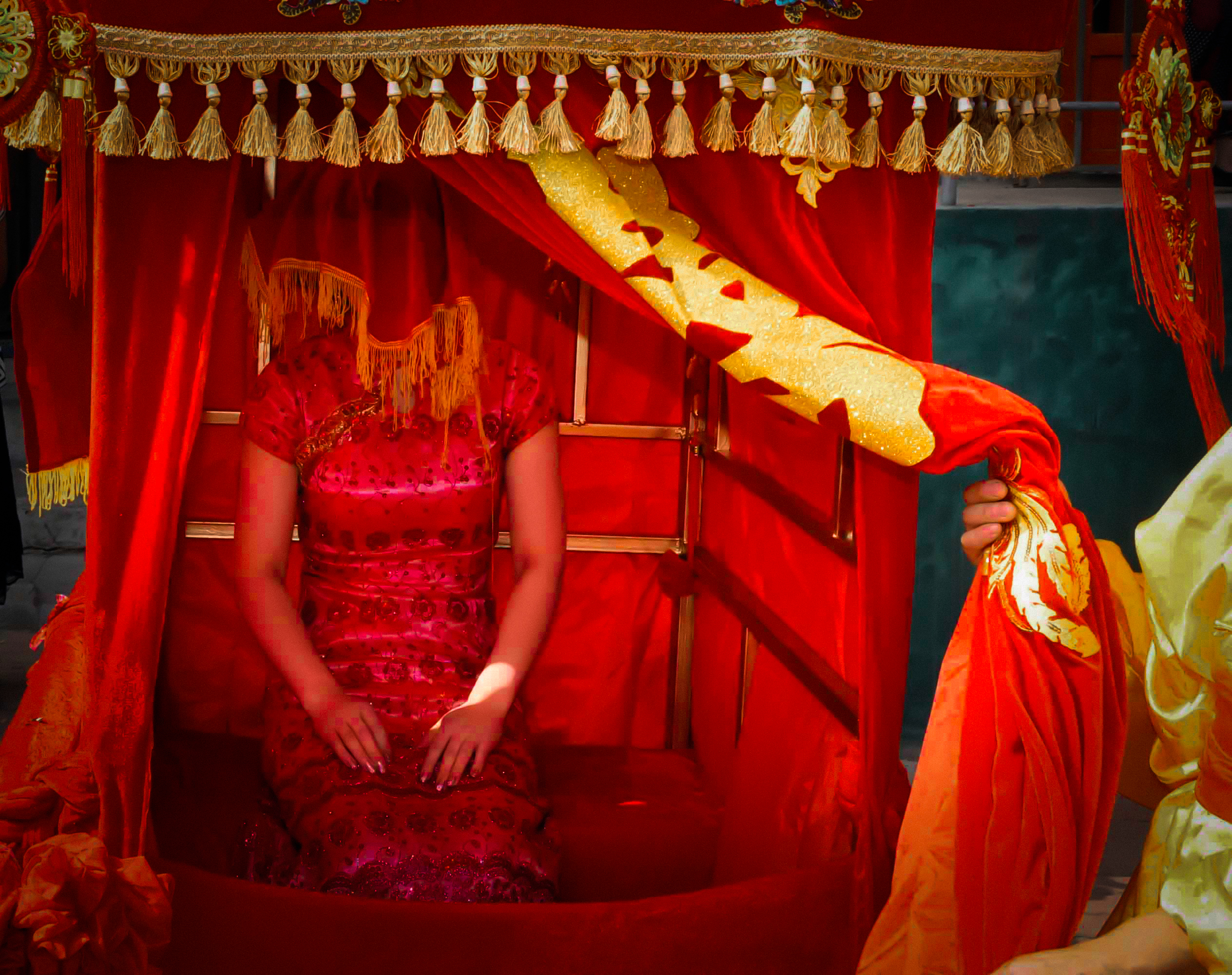
In traditional Chinese wedding ceremonies, the bride arrives in a jiao

At traditional Chinese weddings, the tea ceremony is the equivalent of an exchange of vows at a Western wedding ceremony. This ritual is still practiced widely among rural Chinese; however, young people in larger cities, as well as in Taiwan, Hong Kong, Malaysia, and Singapore, tend to practice a combination of Western style of marriage together with the tea ceremony.

When the bride leaves her home with the groom to his house, a "Good Luck Woman" will hold a red umbrella over her head, meaning, "Raise the bark, spread the leaves." This "Good Luck Woman" should be someone who is blessed with a good marriage, healthy children, and husband and living parents. Other relatives will scatter rice, red beans, and green beans in front of her. The red umbrella protects the bride from evil spirits, and the rice and beans are to attract the attention of the gold chicken.

The newlyweds kneel in front of parents presenting tea. A Good Luck Woman making the tea says auspicious phrases to bless the newlyweds and their families. The newlyweds also present tea to each other, raising the tea cups high to show respect before presenting the tea to each other.

The attendants receiving the tea usually give the bride gifts such as jewelry or a red envelope.

The tea ceremony is an official ritual to introduce the newlyweds to each other's family, and a way for newlyweds to show respect and appreciation to their parents. The newlyweds kneel in front of their parents, serving tea to both sides of parents, as well as elder close relatives. Parents give their words of blessing and gifts to the newlyweds.

=== Welsh customs ===
Prior to the 19th century, first recorded in the 13th century in the Book of Aneirin, a custom known as a 'Neithior' or 'Neithor' was observed by the Welsh, it consisted of a great feast being held the following Sunday after the Wedding at the bride's parental home, the guests would pay for the meals and entertainments so that the new couple could afford a new home.

=== Humanist weddings ===
While many wedding traditions and rituals have origins in religions and are still performed by religious leaders, some marriage traditions are cultural and predate the prevalent religions in those regions. Non-religious people will often want to have a wedding that is secular (not religious) in content. In order to meet this demand, secular ceremonies carried out by humanist celebrants first developed in the 19th century. Humanists UK members pioneered humanist weddings in the 1890s, and its weddings continue to be popular with couples across England, Wales, and Northern Ireland. In Scotland, Humanist Society Scotland (HSS) has carried out secular ceremonies in the country since the 1980s. These have been legally recognized since 2005, and became more numerous than church weddings in 2018. Humanist weddings vary in their content, but tend to include a combination of elements from traditional and modern weddings with an emphasis on the couple's values and their unique love story.

Humanist wedding ceremonies are carried out in a variety of countries like the U.S., Canada and recently Brazil, having legal status in only a few of these countries. Humanist celebrants are able to perform valid civil marriages and civil partnerships in the Republic of Ireland. Secular weddings are becoming more popular in Ireland due to a declining influence of the Catholic Church. Since 2015, Irish humanists have conducted more weddings than the Church of Ireland.

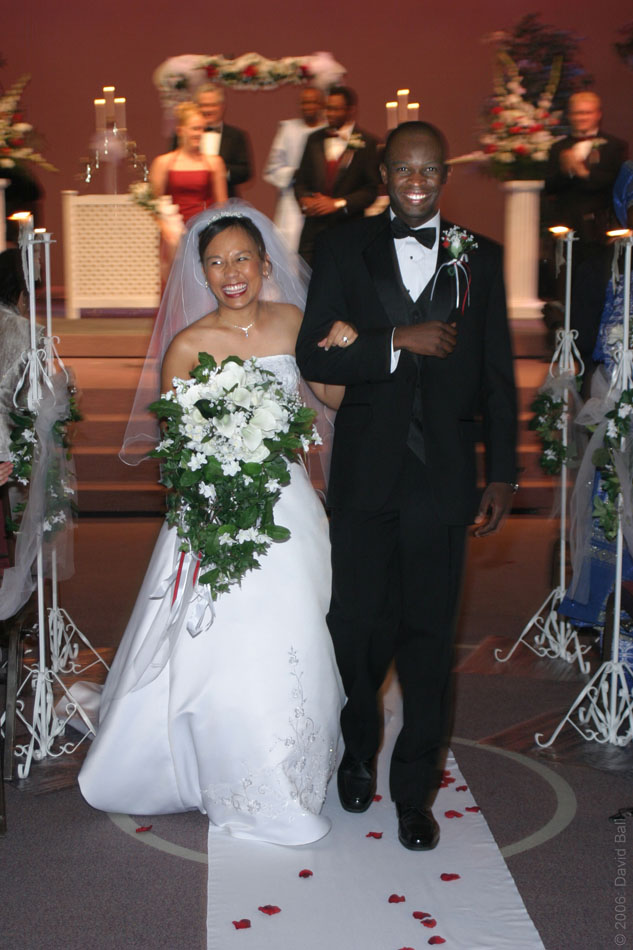
A 2004 California wedding between a Filipina bride and a Nigerian groom.

== Types ==
There are many ways to categorize weddings, such as by the size or cultural traditions. A wedding may fall into several categories, such as a destination microwedding, or a civil elopement.

=== White wedding ===
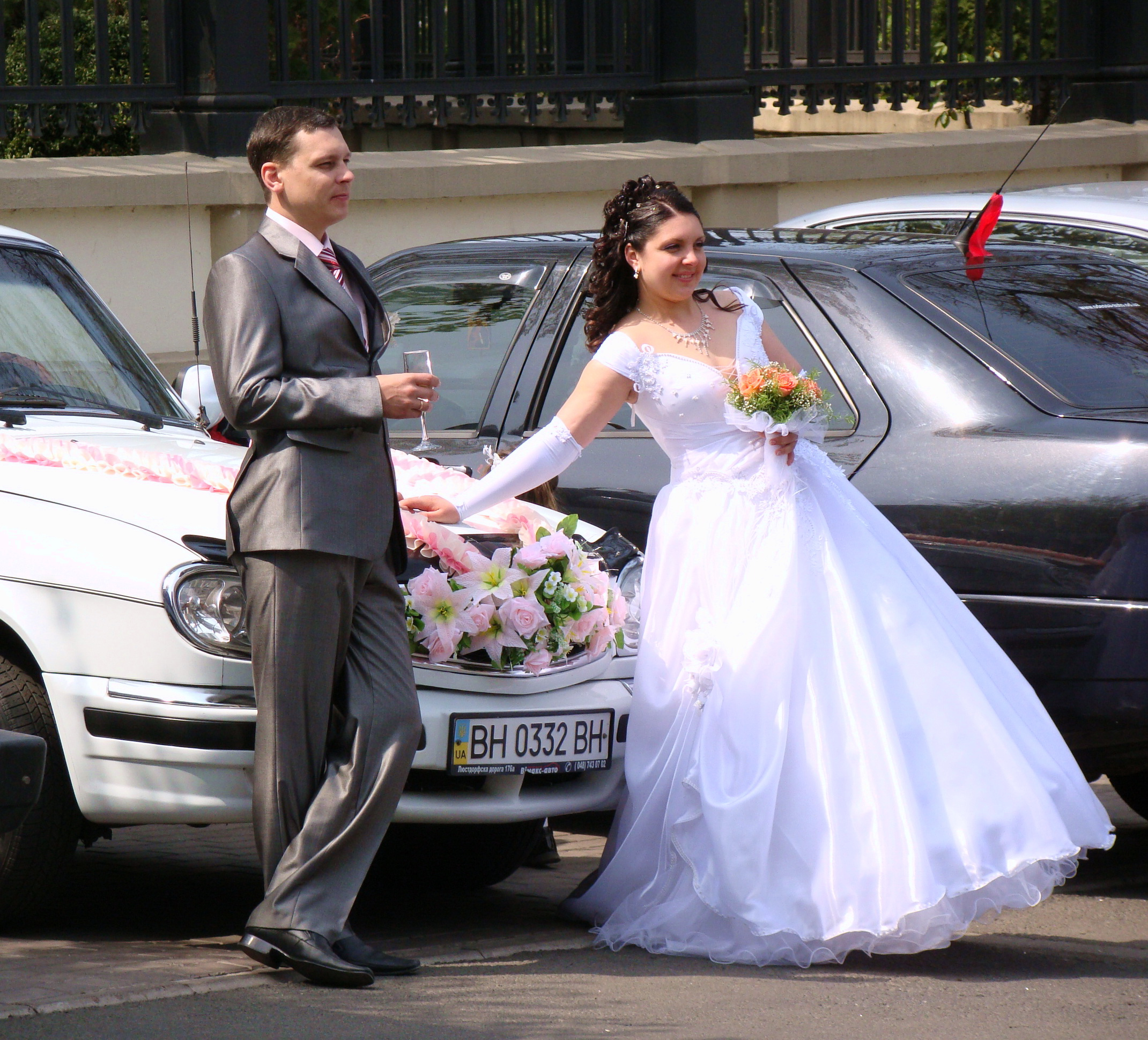
White wedding in Ukraine

A white wedding is a term for a traditional formal or semi-formal Western wedding. This term refers to the color of the wedding dress, which became popular after Queen Victoria wore a pure white gown when she married Prince Albert and many were quick to copy her choice. At the time, the color white symbolized both extravagance and virginal purity to many and had become the color for use by young women being formally presented to the royal court. White weddings often take place in a place of worship, such as a church, synagogue, or mosque.

=== Civil wedding ===
A civil wedding is a ceremony presided over by a local civil authority, such as an elected or appointed judge, Justice of the peace or the mayor of a locality. Civil wedding ceremonies may use references to God or a deity (except in U.K law where readings and music are also restricted), but generally no references to a particular religion or denomination.

Civil weddings allow partners of different faiths to marry without one partner converting to the other partner's religion.

They can be either elaborate or simple. Many civil wedding ceremonies take place in local town or city halls, courthouses in judges' chambers, in attorneys offices, in the mayor's office, or in the governor's office.

The relevance of civil weddings varies greatly from country to country. Some countries do not provide any form of civil wedding at all (Israel and many Islamic countries), while in others it is the only legally recognized form of marriage (most countries in North America, South America, Europe, Asia, Australia and The Pacific). In this case civil weddings are typically either a mandatory prerequisite for any religious ceremony or religious weddings have no legal significance at all. See Civil marriage.

=== Destination wedding ===
Not to be confused with an elopement, a destination wedding is one in which a wedding is hosted, often in a vacation-like setting, at a location to which most of the invited guests must travel and often stay for several days. This type of ceremony could be held on a beach, in a metropolitan resort, a hotel, a banquet hall, a mountain, or at the home of a geographically distant friend or relative. During the recession of 2009, destination weddings continued to see growth compared to traditional weddings, as the typically smaller size results in lower costs. Some of the most popular European destinations for weddings include Lake Como and Tuscany in Italy, Santorini in Greece, and Paris in France.

Destination weddings are prohibited in certain denominations of Christianity, such as the Catholic Church, which teach that Christian marriages should take place in the presence of God at church, where Christians began their journey of faith in the sacrament of baptism.

=== Double wedding ===
A double wedding is a double ceremony where two affianced couples rendezvous for two simultaneous or consecutive weddings. Typically, a fiancé with a sibling or cousin who is also engaged, or four close friends in which both couples within the friendship are engaged might plan a double wedding where both couples legally marry.

=== Elopement ===
Elopement is the act of getting married, often unexpectedly, without inviting guests to the wedding. In some cases, a small group of family or friends may be present, while in others, the engaged couple may marry without the consent or knowledge of parents or others. While the couple may or may not be widely known to be engaged prior to the elopement, the wedding itself is generally a surprise to those who are later informed of its occurrence. Some elopements are planned as adventure weddings, taking place in remote or outdoor locations and incorporating elements such as travel, physical activity, or exploration as part of the ceremony.

=== Handfasting ===
A handfasting is an old pagan custom, dating back to the time of the ancient Celts. A handfasting was originally more like an engagement period, where two people would declare a binding union between themselves for a year and a day. The original handfasting was a trial marriage.

=== Highland or Scottish wedding ===
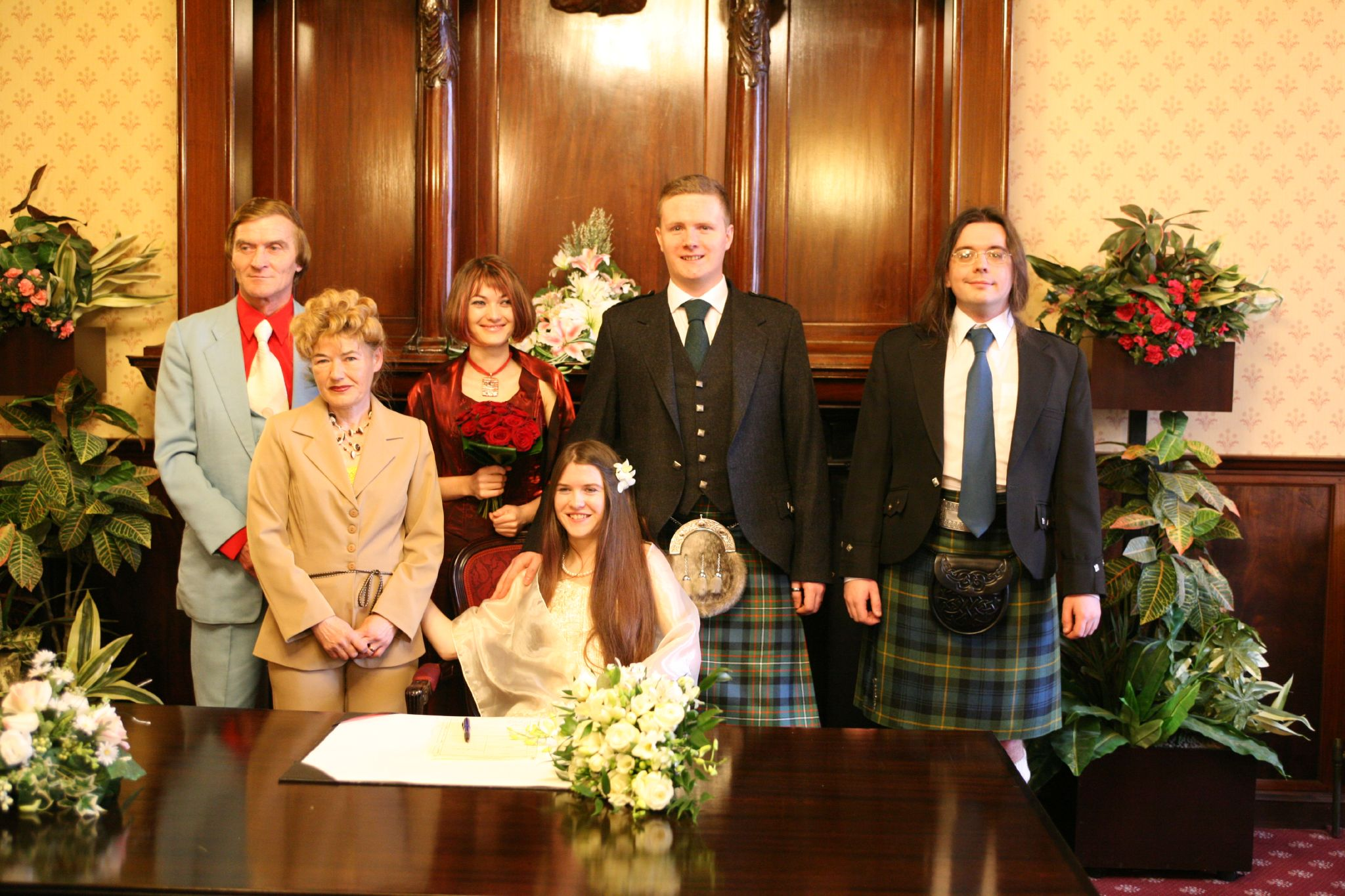
The groom and one other in the wedding party wear a kilt with Argyll jacket and long tie.

A Highland or Scottish wedding has the groom, with some or all of the groom's men wear a kilt. The bride may wear a sash or other tartan clothing. The Scottish basket sword is used for any Saber Arch.

=== Mass wedding ===
A collective or mass wedding is a single ceremony where numerous couples are married simultaneously.

=== Microwedding ===
A microwedding or minimony is defined by the small number of friends and family members present. The number of guests is usually understood to be no more than 10 or 15 people including family members, although some sources will use this label for a small wedding with up to 50 guests. Compared to an elopement or a civil wedding with no guests, a microwedding is planned and announced in advance and may incorporate whatever traditions and activities the family wants to maintain, such as a wedding cake, photographs, or religious ceremonies. Although the cost per guest may be higher, the overall cost of a microwedding is usually significantly less than a large wedding.

Microweddings gained attention during the COVID-19 pandemic as a way to have a wedding event in compliance with public health restrictions. After pandemic restrictions were lifted, they remained popular, with couples particularly appreciating their significantly lower costs.

=== Military wedding ===
A military wedding is a ceremony conducted in a military chapel and may involve a saber arch. In most military weddings one or both of the people getting married will wear a military dress uniform in lieu of civilian formal wear. Some retired military personnel who marry after their service has ended may opt for a military wedding.

=== Peasant wedding ===
A peasant wedding is a Dutch carnival custom.

Not everywhere in Limburg and Brabant is a boerenbruiloft (peasant's wedding) part of the carnival. Especially in the northern and central part of Limburg and eastern part of North Brabant is the boerenbruiloft very often held during the carnival and is an important part of the carnival culture. Each carnival association has its own tradition concerning choosing the spouse for a wedding. Often the bride and groom are chosen by the council of eleven or by the couple that was married the year before. It is not necessary that the newlyweds are a couple in real life. It is also not necessary that the bride and groom are single. Both the bride and groom, however, should be in love during the carnival and they need to transfer their love to all the people who celebrate their wedding along with them. The highlight of the festival of the peasant wedding is the wedding and feast of the onecht (not-marriage) of the bride and groom. There are many aspects that can be found in a real-life marriage. First the engagement will be announced just as if it would be an official marriage. And both the families should learn to know each other very well in organizing the party and the ceremony, like a normal wedding. The two families prepare a piece of entertainment for the wedding. And just like a real wedding, a reception and a feast is organized where guests are asked to wear appropriate clothing. The bride and groom will often dress in wedding clothing from before 1940. The bride, for example, will often wear a poffer, which is a traditional Brabantian headdress.

=== Sequel wedding ===
A sequel wedding is a large-scale wedding ceremony occurring some time after a couple's legal nuptials, which are typically much smaller. Sequel weddings are generally meant to celebrate a couple's union among many guests who were unable to attend the initial wedding or elopement.

=== Shotgun wedding ===
A shotgun wedding is a wedding in which the groom is reluctant to marry the bride but is strongly encouraged to do so to avoid family, social or legal repercussions. In many cases, the bride is pregnant before the wedding and the family of the bride, most commonly her father, insists that the groom marry the bride before the pregnancy becomes obvious.

=== Vow renewal wedding ===
A wedding vow renewal is a ceremony in which a married couple renews or reaffirms their wedding vows. Typically, this ceremony is held to commemorate a milestone wedding anniversary. It may also be held to recreate the marriage ceremony in the presence of family and friends, especially in the case of an earlier elopement.

=== Weekend wedding ===
A weekend wedding is a wedding in which couples and their guests celebrate over the course of an entire weekend. Special activities, such as spa treatments and golf tournaments may be scheduled into the wedding itinerary. Lodging usually is at the same facility as the wedding and couples often host a Sunday brunch for the weekend's finale.

=== Black wedding ===
A black wedding, also known as "shvartse khasene" in Yiddish, or a plague wedding, referred to as "mageyfe khasene" in Yiddish, is a Jewish tradition where a wedding takes place in times of crisis, particularly during epidemics. In this custom, the bride and groom, often impoverished orphans, beggars, or individuals with disabilities, are united in marriage as a means to fend off diseases.

== Wedding ceremony participants ==
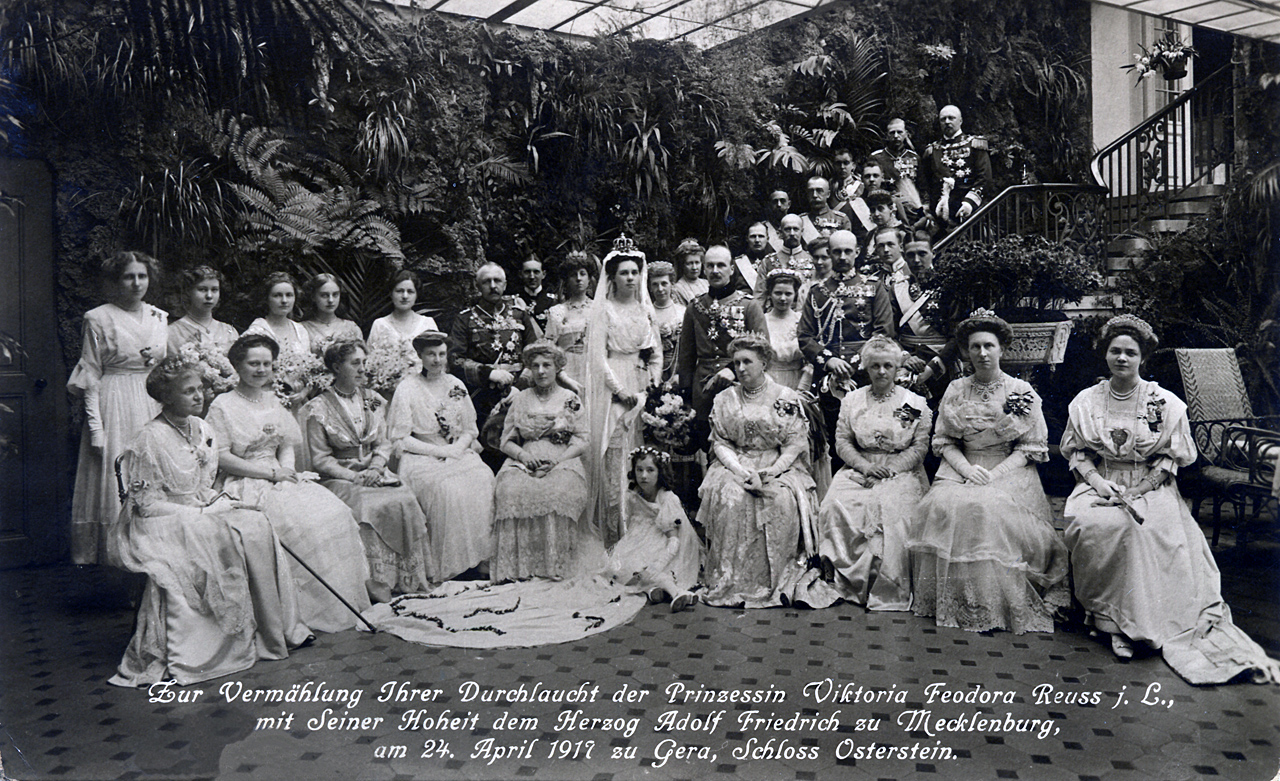
Formal family picture of a royal wedding

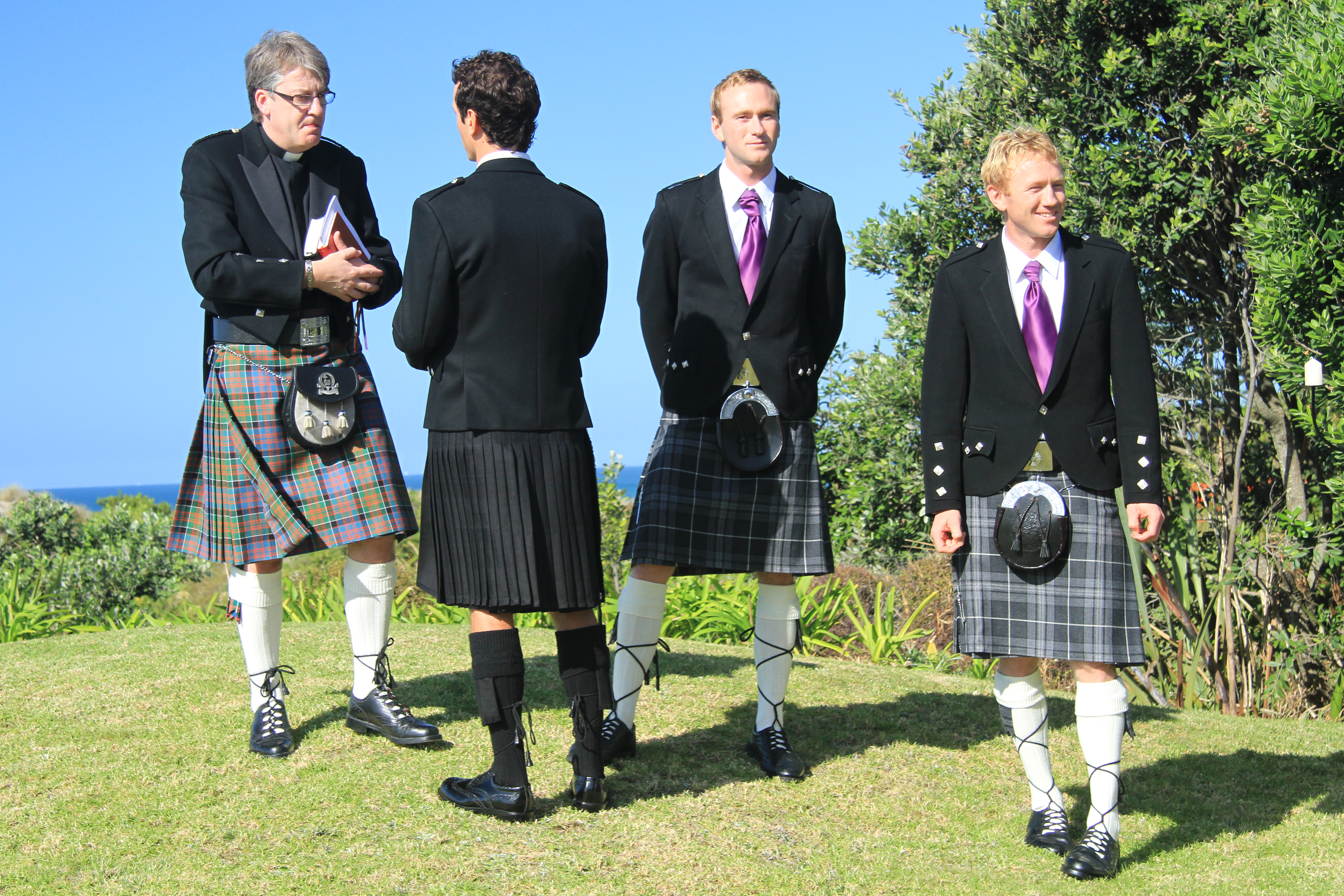
Waiting for the bride. From left: priest, groom and ushers in New Zealand wearing Scottish kilts

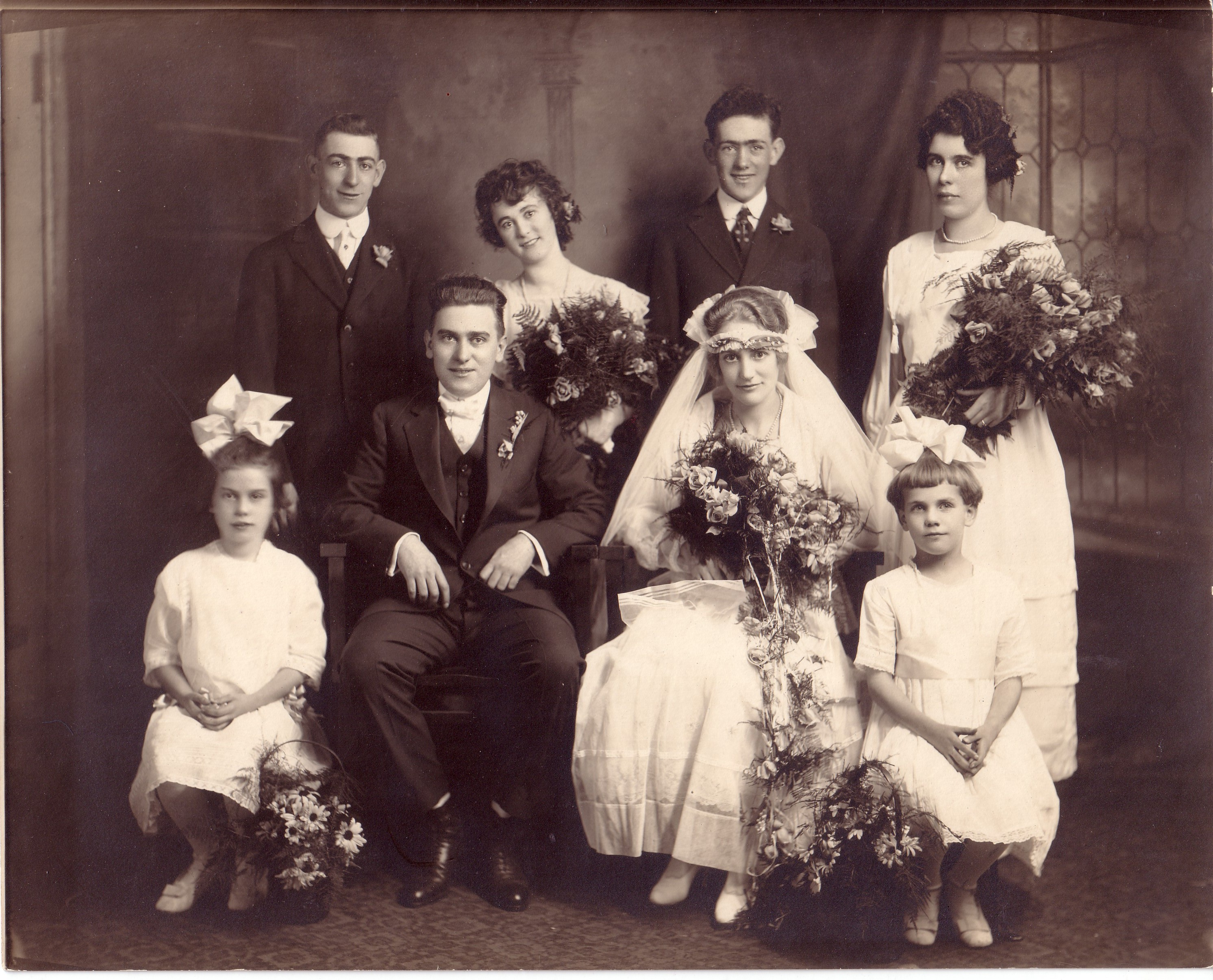
A wedding party in 1918

Wedding ceremony participants also referred to as the wedding party, are the people that participate directly in the wedding ceremony itself.

Depending on the location, religion, and style of the wedding, this group may include only the individual people that are marrying, or it may include one or more brides, grooms (or bridegrooms), persons of honor, bridespersons, best persons, groomsmen, flower girls, pages, and ring bearers.

A "bride's party" consists of those chosen to participate from her family or friends, while a "groom's party" consists of those from his family or friends.

- Bride: A woman about to be married.
- Bridegroom or groom: A man about to be married.
- Marriage officiant: The person who officiates at the wedding, validating the wedding from a legal and/or religious standpoint. This person may be a civil celebrant, judge, justice of the peace, or a member of the clergy. In Hindu marriages, the marriage officiant is called a pandit or Brahmin.
- Best Man, Woman, or Person: The chief assistant to a groom at a wedding, typically a sibling, cousin, or friend of special significance in his life. Often holds the wedding rings until their exchange.
- Mothers of a Bride or Groom
- Fathers of a Bride or Groom
- Maid, Matron, Man, or Person of Honor: the title and position held by a bride's chief attendant, typically her closest friend or sibling.
- Bridesmaids: the female attendants to a bride. Males in this role may be called honor attendants or sometimes bridesmen.
- Groomsmen or Ushers: The attendants, usually male, to a bridegroom in a wedding ceremony. Female attendants, such as a sister of the groom, are typically called honor attendants or sometimes groomswomen or groomsmaids.
- Pages: Young attendants may carry a bride's train. In a formal wedding, the ring bearer is a special page that carries the rings down the aisle. The coin bearer is a similar page that marches on the wedding aisle to bring the wedding coins.
- Flower girls: In some traditions, one or more children carry bouquets or drop flower petals in front of a bride in the wedding procession.

== Wedding industry ==
The global wedding industry was worth $300 billion as of 2016. The United States wedding industry alone was estimated to be worth $60 billion as of the same year. In the United States, the wedding industry employs over one million people throughout 600,000 businesses and grows 2% each year. The industry has undergone a transition due to the increased use of technology. Bridal websites, blogs, and social media accounts have driven spending up and created new trends and traditions.

As of 2013, the average cost of a wedding in the US was $29,858 ($42,802.49 in current dollars). Extravagant spending on weddings is associated with debt stress and short-lived marriages that end in divorce. Couples who spent less than US$10,000 on all wedding-related expenses, who went on a honeymoon trip, and who had a relatively large number of guests in attendance, were the least likely to divorce. (The cost of the honeymoon itself had no effect.) Couples who start their marriage in debt are more likely to have fights early on their marriage which can lead to divorce. The best way to avoid disagreement is to have open communication with families and plan based on means. Even if the wedding goes well and the couple is happy to be married, the stress of putting on the event can lead to post-wedding anxiety or depression.

A wedding tax is the concept of goods or services being purchased for a wedding being more expensive when compared to other events such as a family reunion or anniversary. It is also known as a wedding markup. In 2016, an article published by Consumer Reports identified that 28% of secret shoppers who queried vendors would be charged a wedding markup. Vendors may charge more because they perceive wedding clients as more demanding or willing to spend more. Weddings can also be more time- and labour-intensive events for the vendor (e.g., lengthy planning discussions or ongoing touch-ups for makeup), require additional liability insurance or different materials (e.g., products that can keep the bride's hair in place during many hours of activity). Wedding clients may also receive a markup simply because they are more likely to pay compared to other consumers. Clients are also less likely to understand what a baseline price for these products are given that they are not commonplace purchases.

== By country ==
=== Vietnam ===
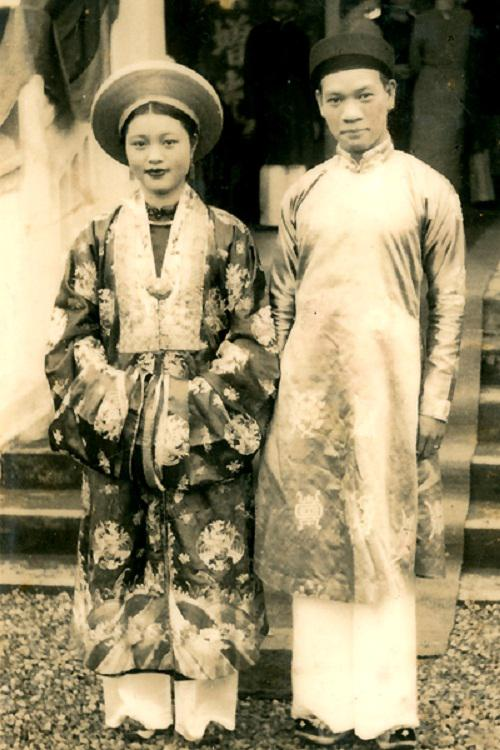
Wedding of professor Nguyễn Văn Huyên and Ms. Vi Kim Ngọc in 1936. The bride was wearing áo nhật bình, the groom was wearing áo ngũ thân and they used khăn vấn on their head.

In the past, the Vietnamese called this ceremony the "bride-fetching ceremony". Nowadays, it is commonly referred to as the "wedding ceremony" or "nuptial ceremony". It is a celebration to honor the happiness of the bride, groom, and their two families. This ceremony is also considered important in some societies and is usually only held after the couple has obtained a marriage certificate from the government. Vietnamese weddings often require choosing an auspicious date for the ceremony and the bride's arrival at the groom's house.

== See also ==
- Wedding customs by country
- White wedding
- Wedding dress
- Wedding reception
- Wedding cake
- Elopement
- Collective wedding
- Black wedding
- Relationship science
- Interethnic marriage
- Interracial marriage
- Interfaith marriage
- Interdenominational marriage
- Inter-caste marriage
- Transnational marriage
- Gay marriage
- Sibling marriage
- Avunculate marriage
- Cousin marriage
