= White wedding =

Traditional formal or semi-formal wedding originating in Great Britain

A white wedding is a traditional formal or semi-formal wedding originating in Great Britain.

The term originates from the white colour of the wedding dress, popularised by Victorian era elites after Queen Victoria wore a white lace dress at her 1840 wedding to Prince Albert. The white wedding style was given another significant boost in 1981, when 750 million people watched the wedding of Lady Diana Spencer to Charles, Prince of Wales, which saw her wear an elaborate ivory taffeta dress with an 8 metres (26 ft) train.

The full white wedding experience today typically requires the family to arrange for or purchase printed or engraved wedding invitations, musicians, decorations such as flowers or candles, clothes and flowers for bridesmaids, groomsmen, a flower girl and a ring bearer. They may also add optional features such as a guest book or commemorative wedding leaflets. It is common to have a celebration after the wedding ceremony, normally featuring a large wedding cake with white icing. The term now also encapsulates the entire Western wedding routine, especially in the Christian religious tradition, which generally includes a church service during which the marriage begins, followed by a reception.

== History of the white dress and traditions ==
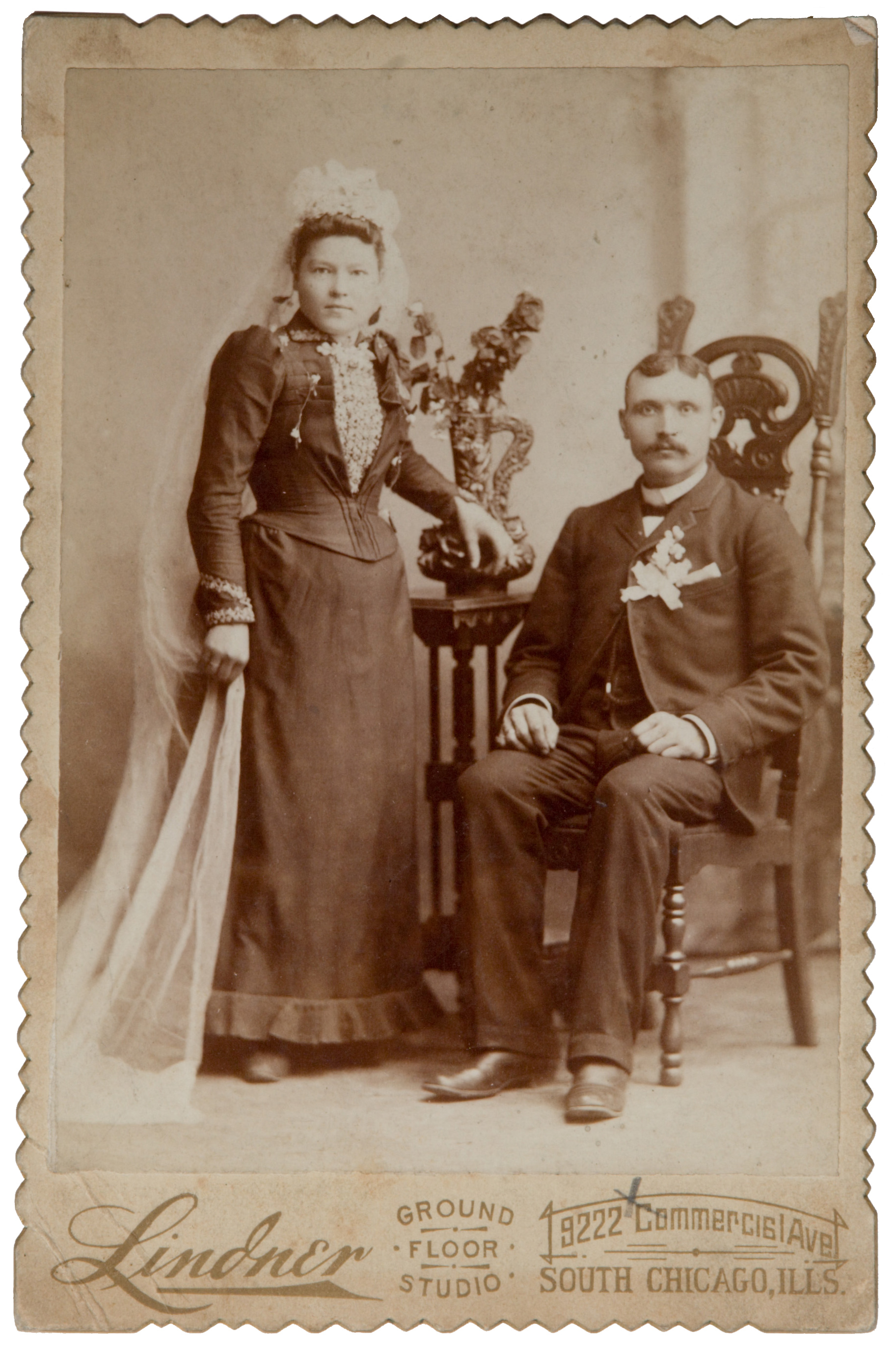
A bride from the late 19th century wearing a black or dark coloured wedding dress

Though Mary, Queen of Scots, wore a white wedding gown in 1559 when she married her first husband, Francis, Dauphin of France, the tradition of a white wedding dress is commonly credited to Queen Victoria's choice to wear a white court dress at her wedding to Prince Albert in 1840. Debutantes had long been required to wear white court dresses and long white gloves for their first presentation at court, at a "Drawing Room" where they were introduced to the queen for the first time.

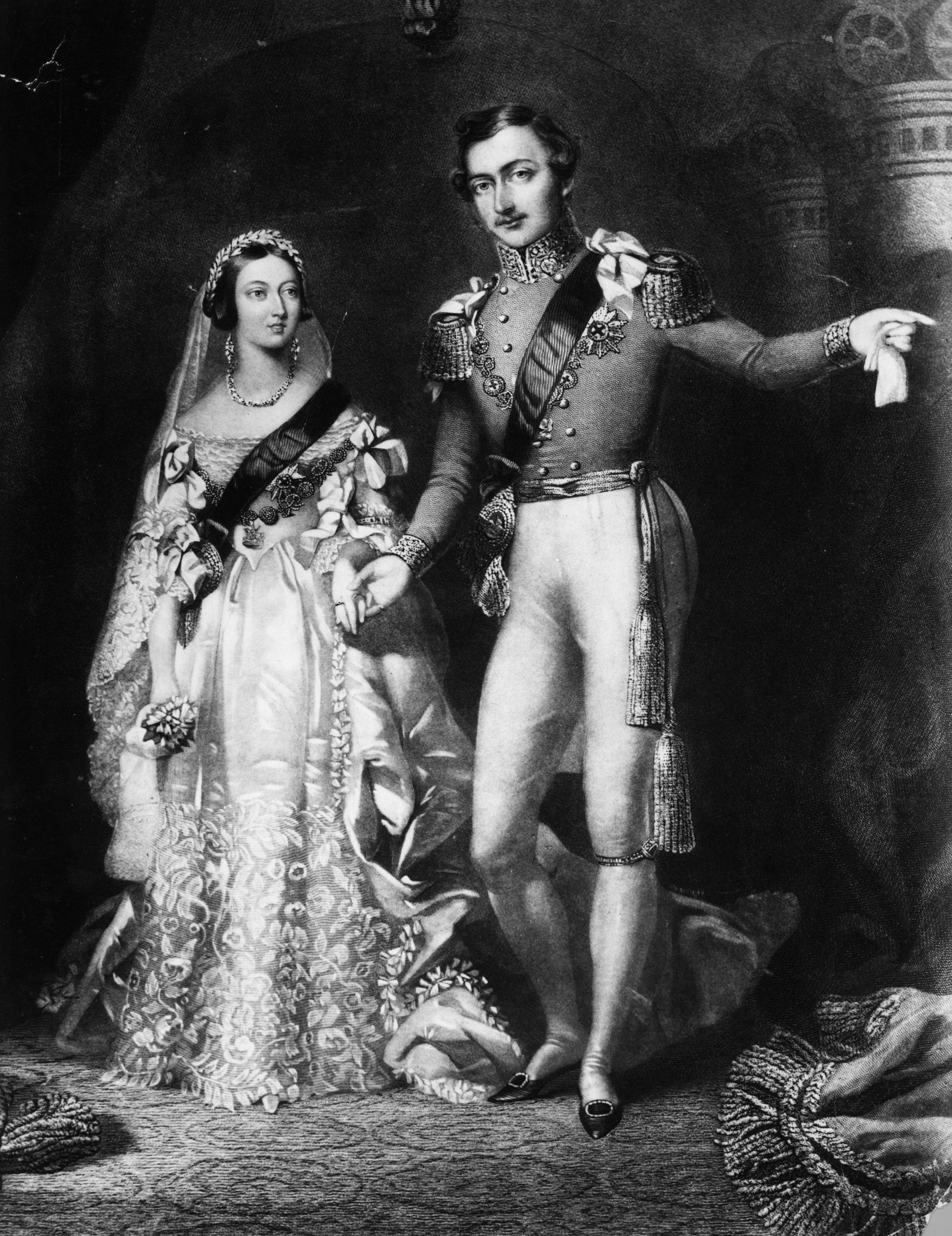
Queen Victoria and Prince Albert on their return from the marriage service at St James's Palace, London, 10 February 1840.

Royal brides before Victoria did not typically wear white, instead choosing "heavy brocaded gowns embroidered with white and silver thread," with red being a particularly popular colour in Western Europe more generally. During this time, European and American brides wore a variety of colours, including blue, yellow, and darker colours like black, brown, or gray. As accounts of Victoria's wedding spread across the Atlantic and throughout Europe, many people followed her lead.

The traditional white wedding was not necessarily defined by the color of the dress only. The wedding of Queen Victoria's daughter Victoria to Prince Fredrick William of Prussia in 1858 also introduced choral music to the processional when standard practice had been to have music of any kind only during a party after the wedding ceremony.

Because of the limitations of laundering techniques before the later part of the 20th century, white dresses provided an opportunity for conspicuous consumption. They were favored primarily as a way to show the world that the bride's family was so wealthy and so firmly part of the leisure class that the bride would choose an elaborate dress that could be ruined by any sort of work or spill.

Women were required to wear veils in many Christian churches through the mid-20th century; the resurgence of the wedding veil as a symbol of the bride, and its use even when not required by the bride's religion, coincided with societal emphasis on women being modest and well-behaved.

Etiquette books then began to turn the practice into a tradition and the white gown soon became a popular symbol of status that also carried "a connotation of innocence and virginal purity." The story put out about the wedding veil was that decorous brides were naturally too timid to show their faces in public until they were married.

By the end of the 19th century the white dress was the garment of choice for elite brides on both sides of the Atlantic. However, middle-class British and American brides did not adopt the trend fully until after World War II. With increased prosperity in the 20th century, the tradition also grew to include the practice of wearing the dress only once. As historian Vicky Howard writes, "[i]f a bride wore white in the nineteenth century, it was acceptable and likely that she wore her gown again". Even Queen Victoria had her famous lace wedding dress re-styled for later use.

After World War I, as full-scale formal weddings began to be desired by the mothers of brides who did not have a permanent social secretary, the position of the wedding planner, who could coordinate the printer, florist, caterer and seamstress, began to assume importance. The first edition of Bride's Magazine was published in 1934 as a newspaper advertising insert called ‘So You're Going to Get Married!’ in a column entitled ‘To the Bride’ and its rival Modern Bride began publishing in 1949.

The portrayal of weddings in Hollywood movies, particularly immediately after World War II, helped crystallize and homogenize the white wedding into a normative form.

== Participants ==
Traditional weddings require, in addition to the bride and groom, a marriage officiant, which is a minister, priest, pastor, vicar, rabbi, imam, or civil officer who is authorized to perform marriages and will read out of a Bible, Tanakh, Quran, or Civil document.

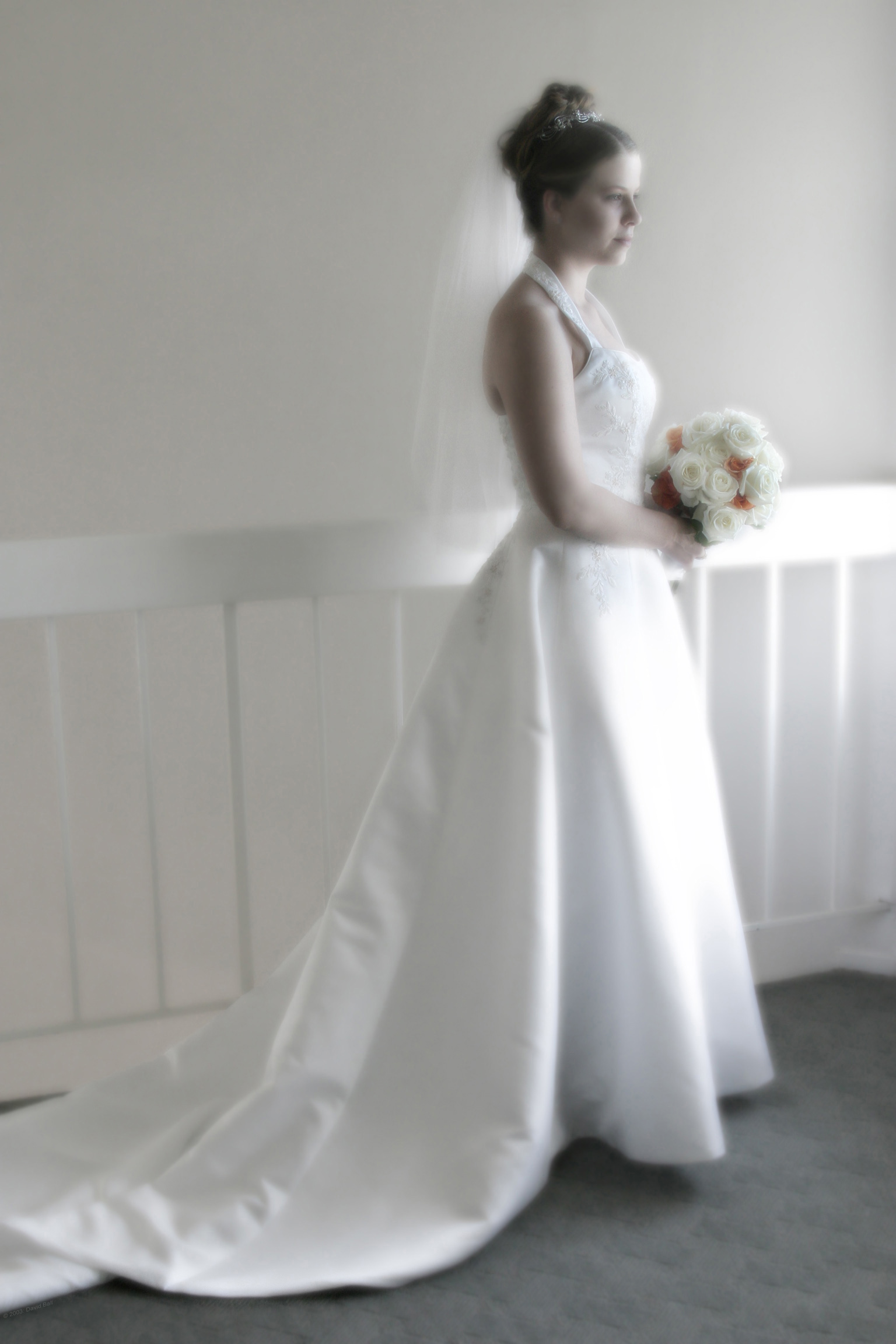
A bride in a contemporary white wedding dress with train, tiara and white veil, taken in 2003.

Typical white weddings also include a wedding party, which consists of some or all of the following:

- Groomsmen or ushers: One or more friends or family members who assist the groom, usually men. The chief groomsman is called the best man, and is given a place of honor. A woman (such as the sister of the groom) is called an honor attendant (matron of honour in the UK). A boy too young to be marriageable, but too old to be a ring bearer, is called a junior groomsman.
- Bridesmaids: One or more friends or family members who support the bride, usually women. The chief bridesmaid may be called a maid of honor or matron of honor. A girl too young to be marriageable, but too old to be a flower girl, is called a junior bridesmaid.
- Flower girl: A young girl who scatters flowers in front of the bridal party.
- Ring bearer: An attendant, often a young boy, who carries the wedding rings.

Typically these positions are filled by either close friends or family members (or both) of the bride and groom; being asked to serve in these capacities is seen as an honor and typically entails some expense.

== The ceremony ==
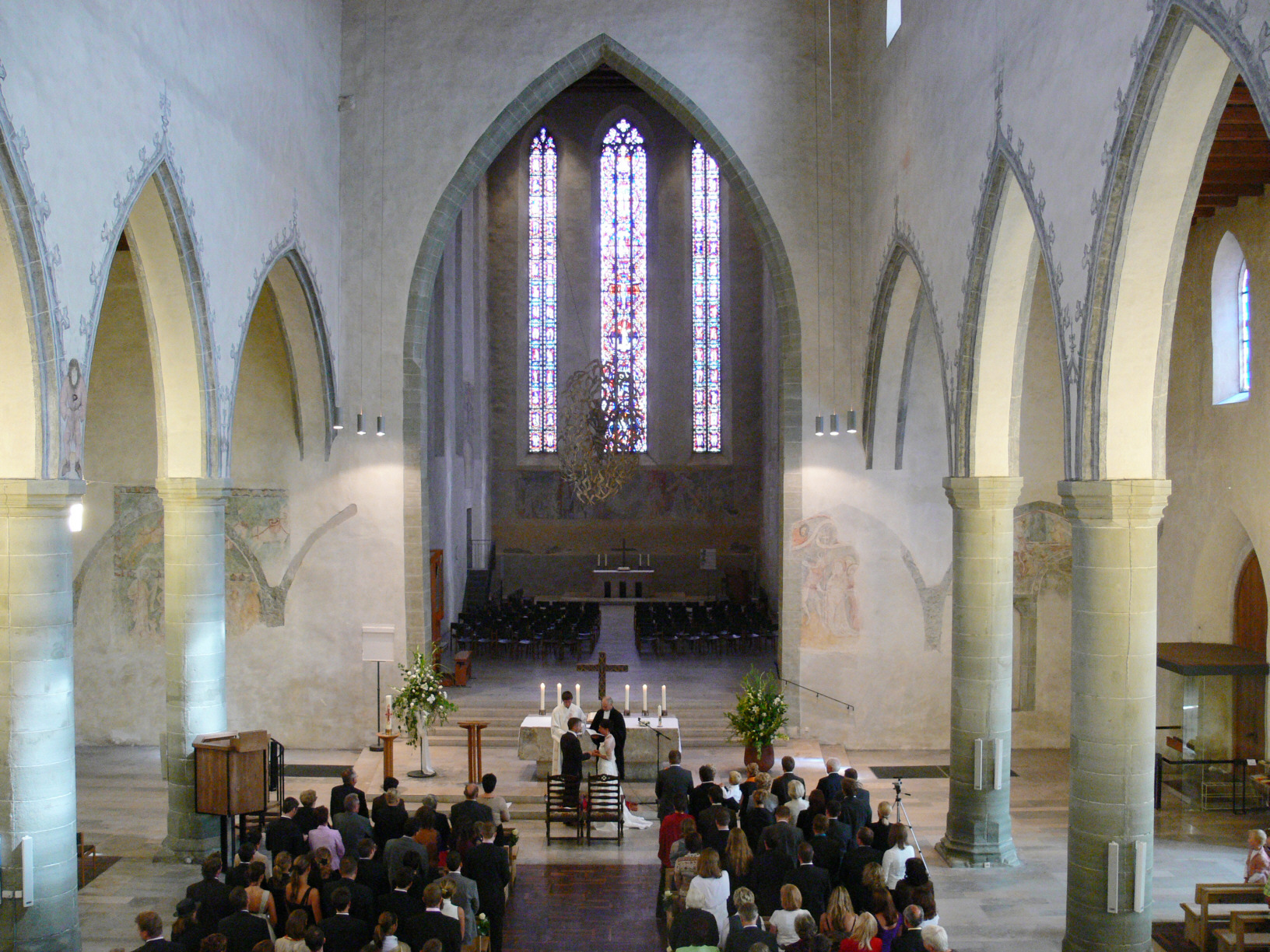
A Lutheran priest in Germany marries a young couple at the church.

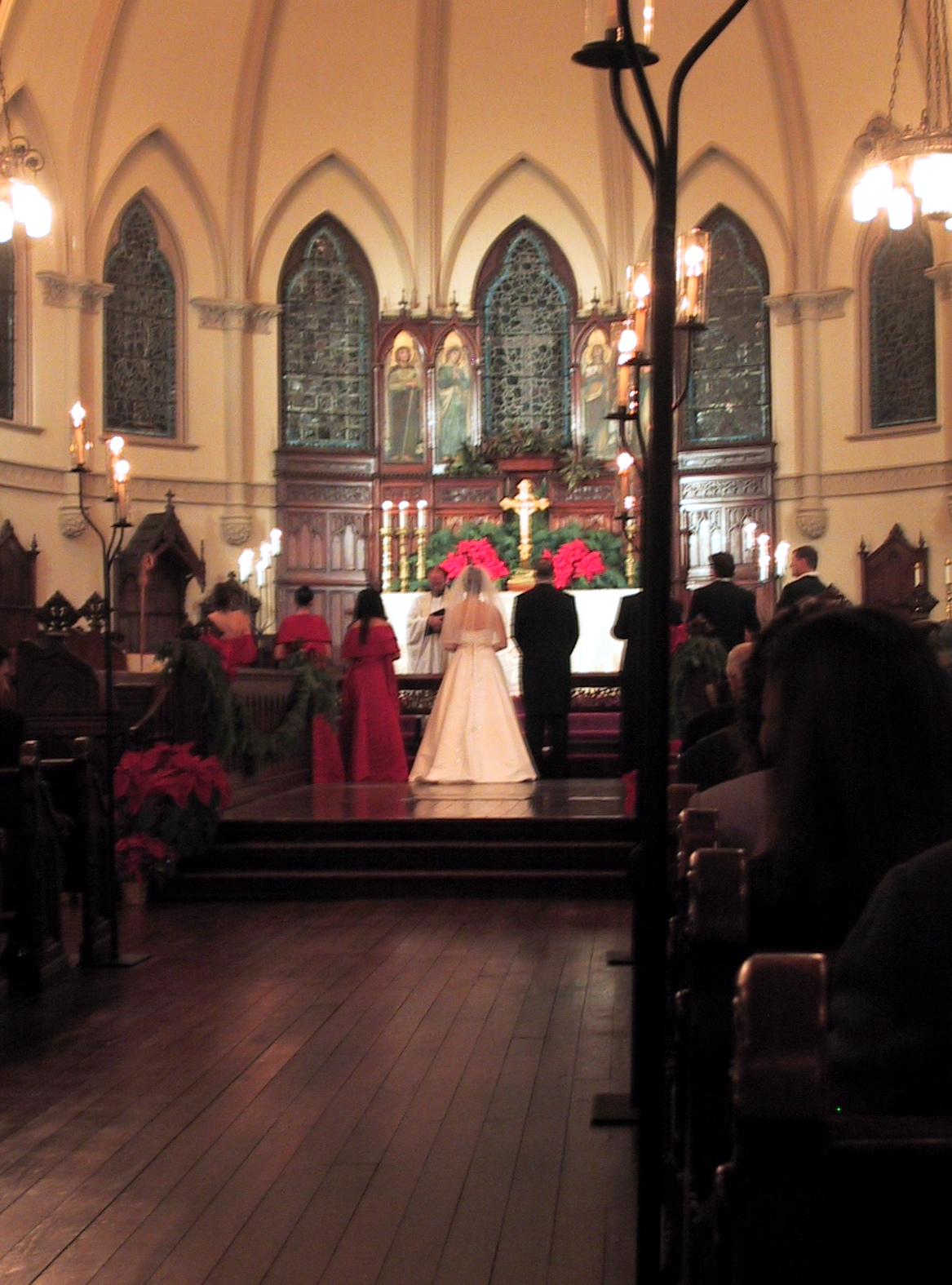
The bride and groom stand before the altar during the wedding ceremony, surrounded by the bridesmaids and groomsmen.

When the guests arrive for a wedding, the ushers, if any, help the guests take their places. In a typical white wedding ceremony, which is derived primarily from the Christian tradition (inclusive of denominations such as Lutheranism and Anglicanism, for example), the bride and groom will stand side by side at the front of the church before the chancel throughout most or all the ceremony. Consequently, some guests prefer to sit on the side closer to the person they know best. Typically, this means that the bride's family sits on the house left and the groom's family on house right. The front rows are generally reserved for close family members or friends.

Some couples make a ceremony of having their grandparents, step-parents, and parents escorted to their seats immediately before the wedding procession begins. In other cases, these relatives form part of the wedding procession.

Depending on the country, her age and situation, and her personal preferences, the bride may walk alone or be escorted by her father, both of her parents, one or more relatives she wishes to honor, or the groom. In Swedish white weddings, the bride and groom usually go down the aisle together. Similarly, some couples choose to have the groom escorted to the altar by his family.

Whether the bride is the first or the last of the wedding party to enter the church varies by country. In the US, the bride is typically last, being preceded by the rest of the wedding party. In the UK, she leads the procession, followed by any bridesmaids, flower girls and page boys. Sometimes the groom is already present in the church; other times, he and any groomsmen form part of the procession. The music played during this procession is commonly called a wedding march, no matter what songs are played.

If the wedding is part of a religious service, then technically the service begins after the arrival of the participants, commonly with a prayer, blessing, or ritual greeting. During the ceremony, each partner in the couple makes marriage vows to the other in front of the marriage officiant. The ceremony might include the playing of a prelude, the singing of hymns, and Bible readings, as well as Holy Communion in accordance with the Christian marriage liturgy of the church at which the wedding is held, e.g. Lutheran, Catholic, Presbyterian, Anglican, Methodist, Baptist, Mormon, Calvinist, Unitarian, Protestant, Orthodox, etc.

After the wedding ceremony itself ends, the bride, groom, officiant, and two witnesses generally go off to a side room to sign the wedding register in the United Kingdom or the state-issued marriage license in the United States. Without the signing of the register or the marriage license, a marriage has not legally occurred in these nations.

== The reception ==
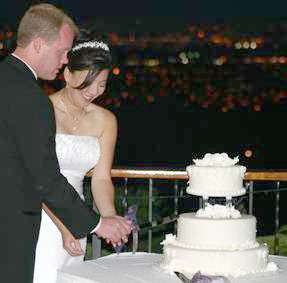
Couple cutting a wedding cake

After this, the celebrations shift to a reception at which the newly married couple, as the guests of honor, and the hosts and perhaps members of the wedding party greet the guests in a receiving line. Although now commonly called a reception no matter the style of party, wedding celebrations range from simple receptions to dinner parties to grand wedding balls.

Food is served, particularly including a wedding cake. Wedding cakes are often multi-tiered layer cakes that are elaborately decorated with white icing. Cutting the wedding cake is often turned into a ritual, complete with sharing a symbolic bite of the cake in a rite that harks back to the pagan confarreatio weddings in ancient Rome.

During the reception, a number of short speeches or toasts may be given in honor of the couple.

If there is dancing, the bride and groom, as the guests of honor, are expected to be the first people to begin dancing. This is usually termed the bridal waltz, even if the couple has arranged for a different style of music. Some families then contrive a series of arranged dances between the newlyweds and their parents, or other members of the wedding party, with guests expected to watch the performances.

At some point, the married couple may become the object of a charivari, a good-natured hazing of the newly married couple. The nature depends upon the circumstances. The guests might tie tin cans or a sign saying "Just Married" to the bumper of the couple's car, if they depart in their own car rather than a hired one.

As the guests of honor, the newly married couple is the first to leave the party. From ancient Rome through the Middle Ages in Europe, wheat kernels were thrown at the bride in a wish for affluence; now it is typical to throw rice, as a symbol of fertility, at the couple as they depart.

== Gallery ==
Photographs from late 19th century, early 20th century, and mid 20th century weddings. The first two images show the bride in a black or dark dress. The photographic styles of capturing weddings continues to evolve from posed somber expressions to candid moments showing emotion and joy.

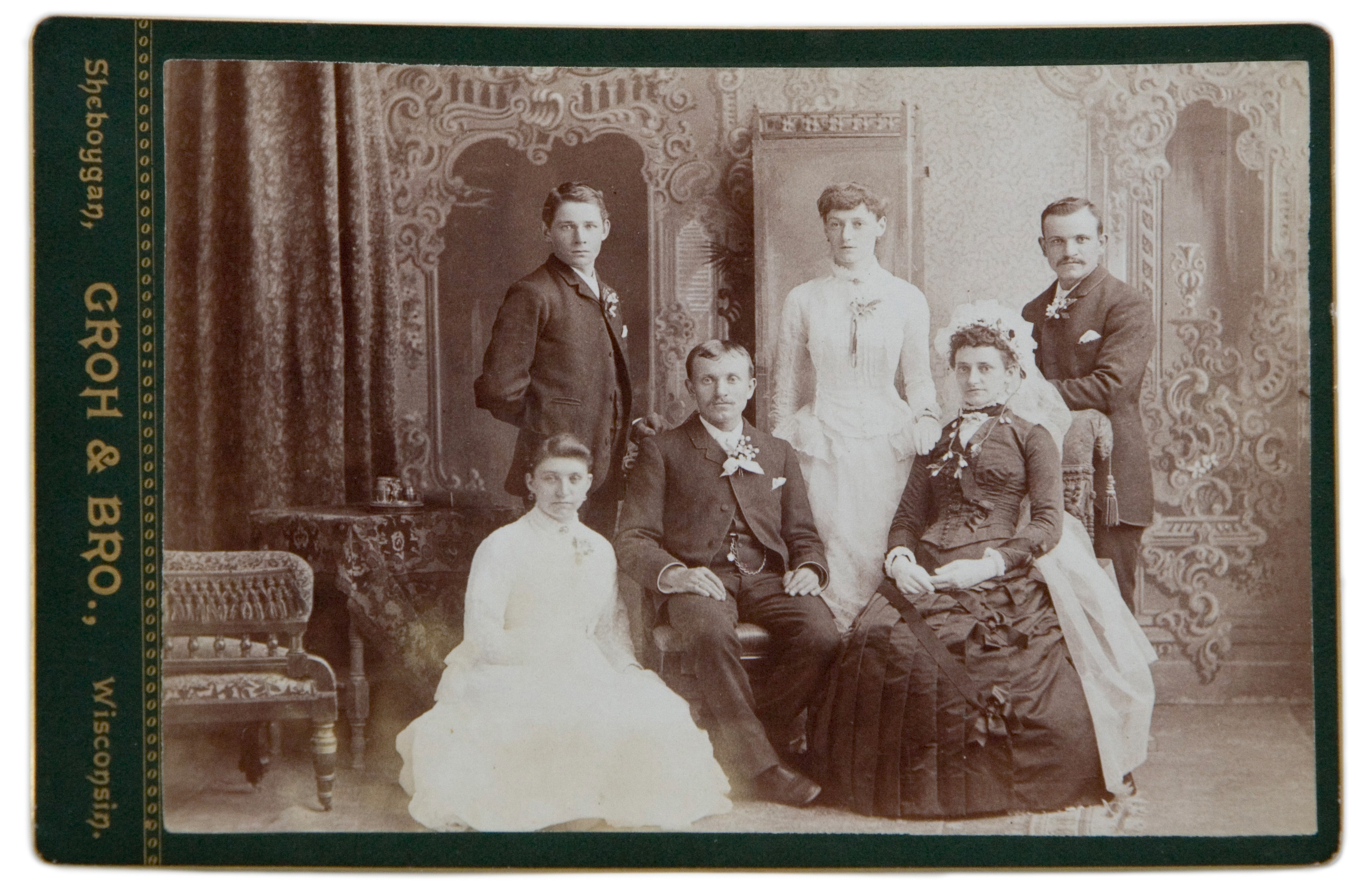
A wedding party from the 1870s or 1880s

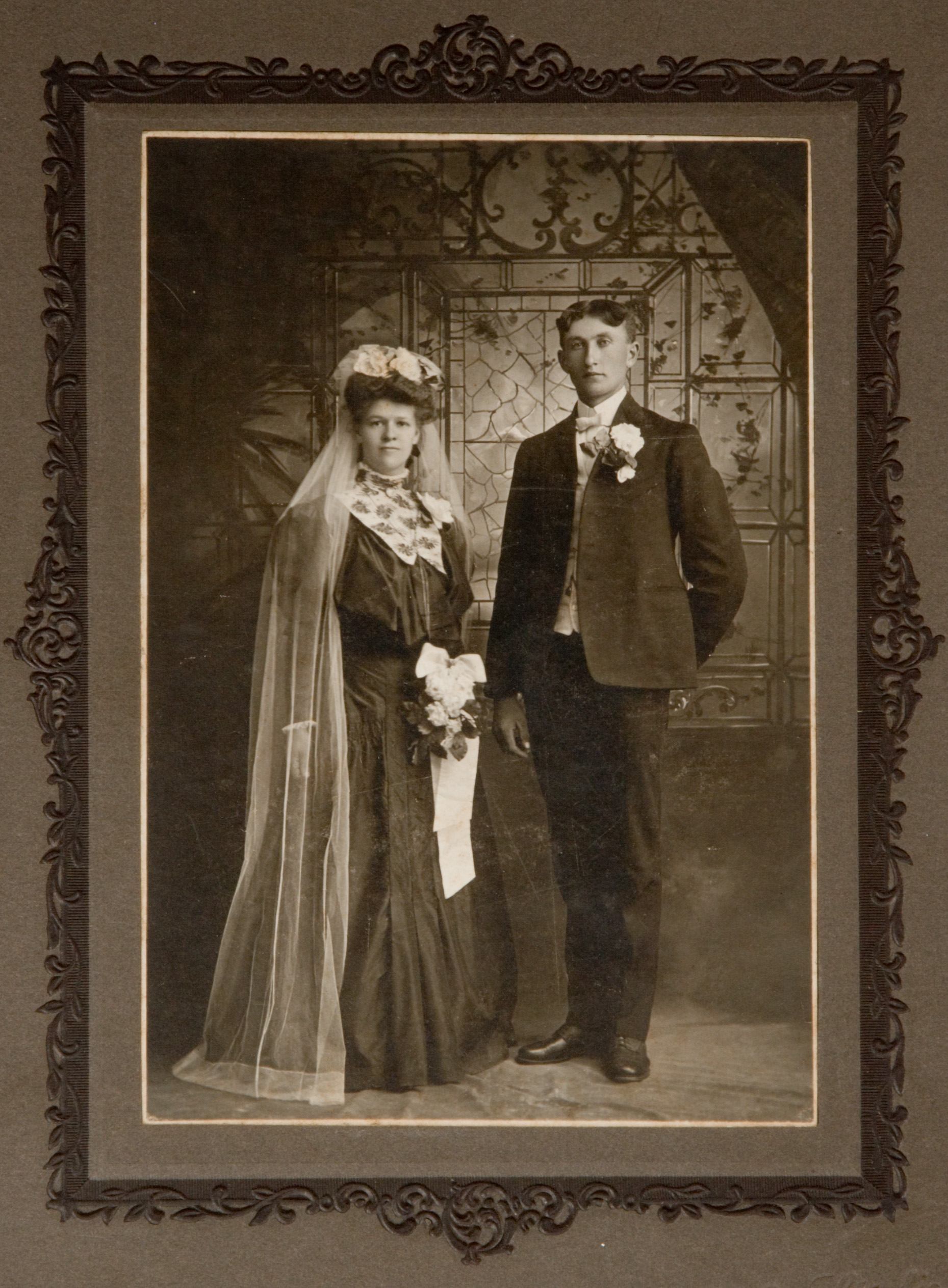
Late 1800s

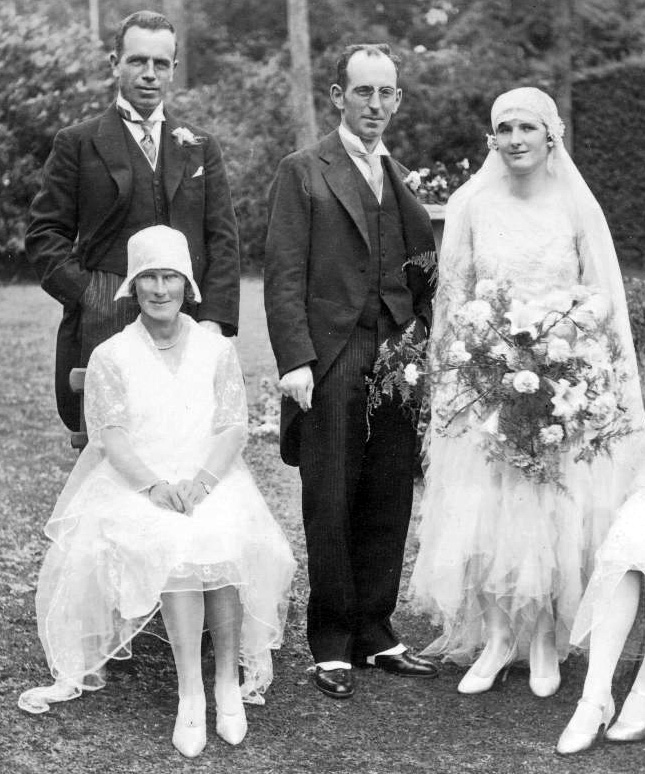
1929 wedding

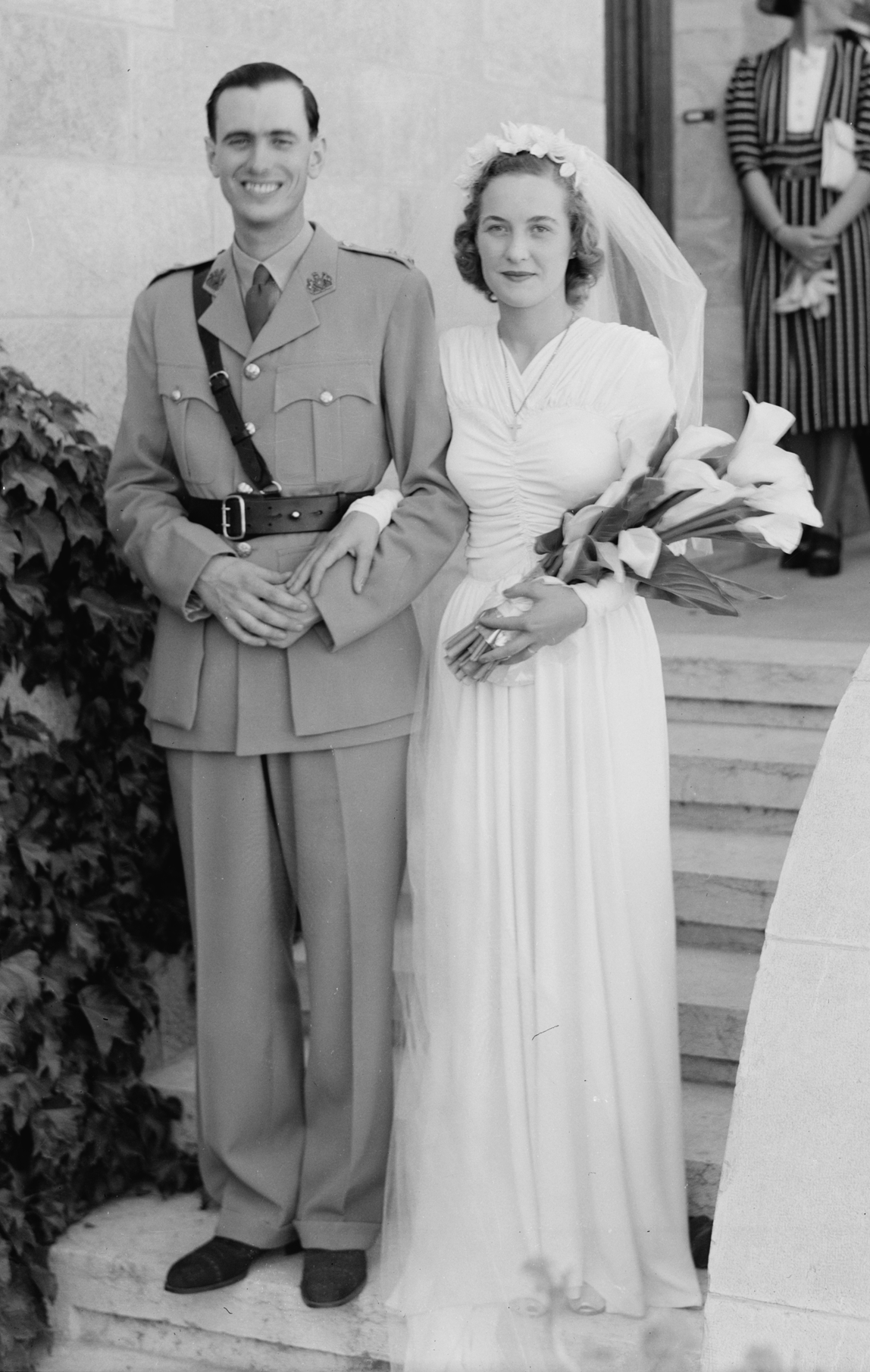
1942 wedding

== See also ==
- Wedding dress of Queen Victoria
- Wedding dress of Lady Diana Spencer
- Black wedding
