= Flower girl =

Girl who scatters flower petals at a wedding

A flower girl is a young girl who scatters flower petals down the aisle during a wedding procession.

== In weddings ==
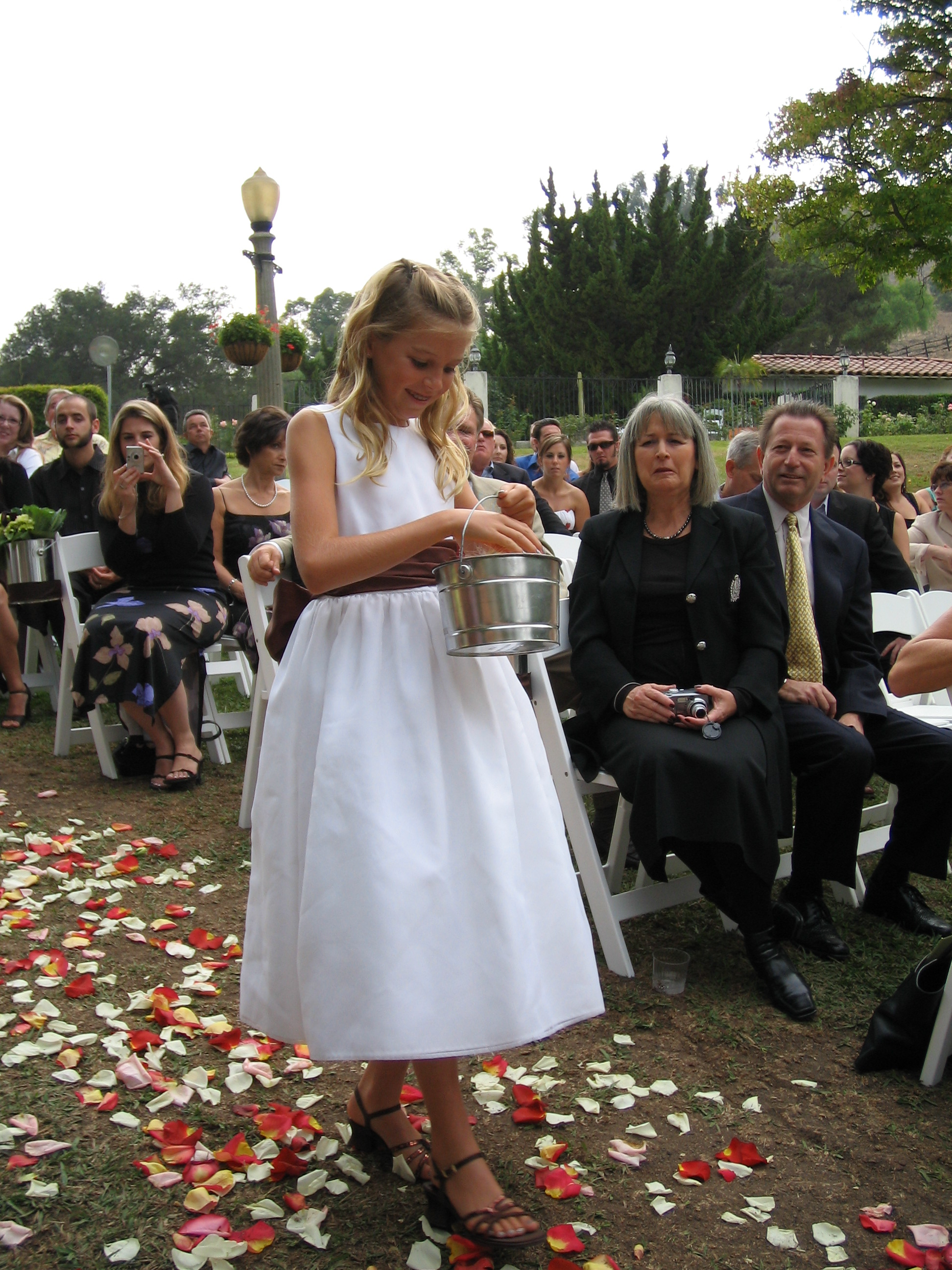
Flower girl at a wedding

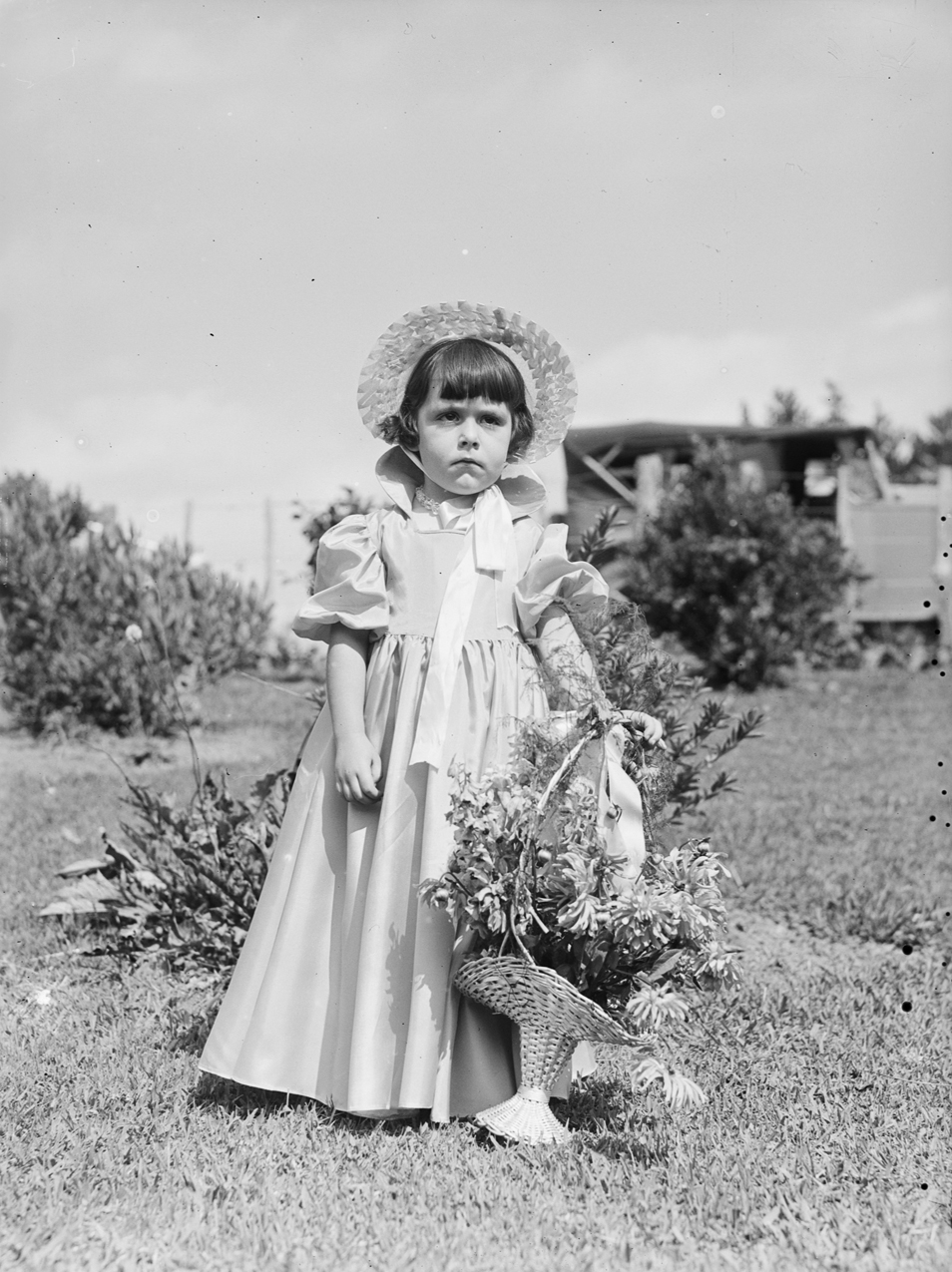
A flower girl in 1940s New Zealand

In a traditional wedding procession, flower girls are usually members of the bride or groom's extended families or a friend of either family and are usually three to seven years old. In a wedding procession a flower girl walks down the aisle with her partner, usually the ring bearer or page boy.

=== Activities ===
A flower girl typically walks in front of the bride during the wedding procession and scatters flower petals on the floor before the bride walks down the aisle, but some venues do not allow the scattering of petals.

Her outfit usually resembles a smaller version of the bride's wedding dress. Traditionally, a flower girl's clothing was provided by the families of the bride and groom; however, most couples today expect the flower girl's parents to pay for her clothing and other expenses related to her participation.

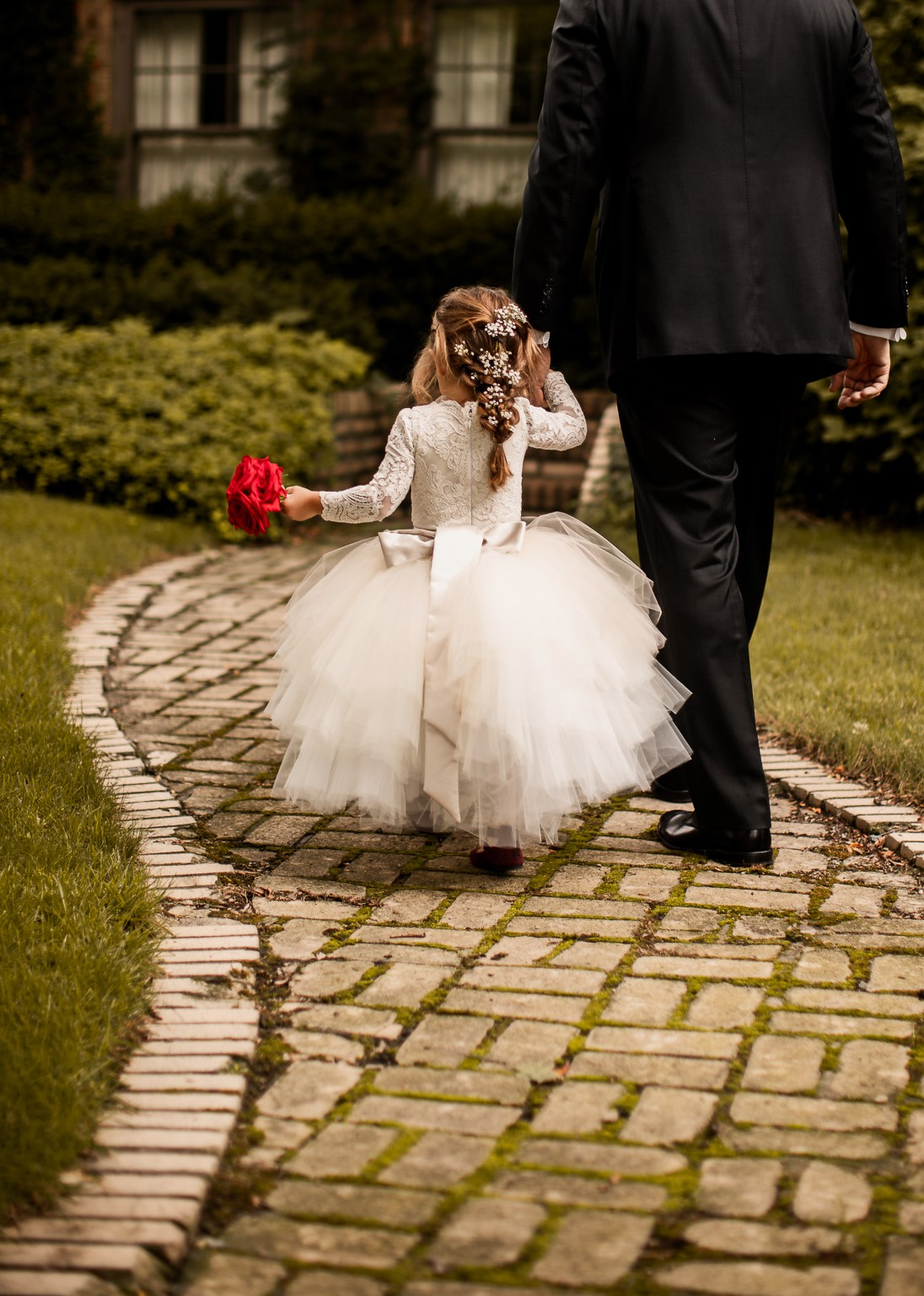
Flower girl wearing the popular Anagrassia flower girl dress: a lace bodysuit with big tulle skirt

=== Symbolism ===
Some couples want a flower girl in the wedding party to enhance the aisle with flower petals. Some view the flower girl as symbolically leading the bride forward, from childhood to adulthood. The flower girl follows the maid of honor, and may carry wrapped candies, confetti, a single bloom, a ball of flowers, or bubbles instead of flower petals.

The flower girl may symbolize the bride as a child, as she is typically a young girl dressed similarly to the bride. She may also symbolize the forming of their new family.

== History ==
Centuries ago, couples often married for political reasons rather than love. In some cultures, marriages were arranged by parents. In these arranged marriages, the bride and groom did not meet before the wedding. Since procreation was the primary purpose of arranged marriages, fertility was a concern for the newlyweds. To symbolize the blessings of fertility and prosperity for the couple, flower girls carried sheaves of wheat and bouquets of herbs. In the present-day U.S., these historical fertility symbols have been replaced by flowers or flower petals.

=== Roman Empire and the Renaissance ===
In the Roman Empire, flower girls were young virgins who carried a sheaf of wheat during the wedding ceremony; it was believed that this would bring prosperity to the bride and groom. During the Renaissance, flower girls carried strands of garlic based on the belief that garlic repelled evil spirits and bad luck.

=== Elizabethan era ===
In the Elizabethan era, wedding guests would scatter flower petals from the bride's home to the church. Flower girls followed musicians in the wedding procession, carrying a gilded rosemary branch and a silver bride's cup adorned with ribbons. The cup was usually filled with flower petals or rosemary leaves, as an alternative to a basket. Other alternatives included a small bunch of rosemary sprigs used as a sweet posy or a small floral bouquet, incorporating sprigs of fresh rosemary.

=== Victorian era ===
The Victorian flower girl most resembles the modern one. Victorian-era flower girls were traditionally dressed in white, perhaps with a sash of colored satin or silk. Her dress, usually made of muslin, was intentionally simple to allow future use. The Victorian flower girl carried an ornate basket of fresh blooms or sometimes a floral hoop, its shape echoing that of the wedding ring and symbolizing that love has no end.

=== Royal influence ===
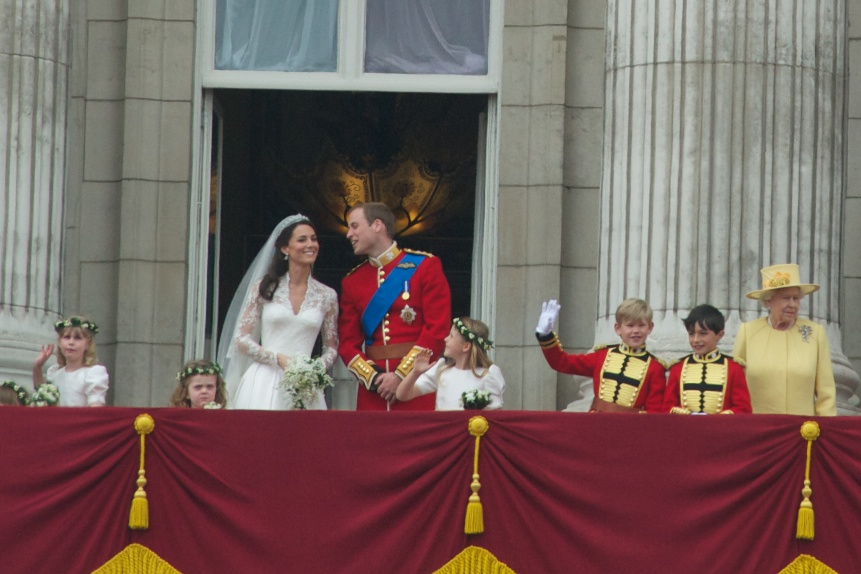
Three flower girls can be seen after the wedding of Prince William and Catherine Middleton in 2011

In the Western Europe, the tradition of child attendants in weddings was not limited to the flower girl and ring bearer but extended to the entire wedding party. This tradition is seen in royal and society weddings and weddings around the world, where several flower girls are common.

== See also ==
- Flower child
