= Elizabeth Johnston (dressmaker) =

British dress maker

Elizabeth Johnston (born ca. 1786) was a fashionable British dressmaker and fashion merchant. She was the official royal dressmaker of Queen Adelaide and Queen Victoria.

== Life and career ==
She was married to Alexander Johnston, who managed A. Johnston, a ‘Millinery, Dress, and Moravian Work Baby Linen Establishment’ in the New Town of Edinburgh in 1822. From 1824, the shop sold French textiles, which Elizabeth travelled to Paris to procure. From 1825, it employed dressmaker apprentices. In 1829, Elizabeth and her daughters Anne (b. 1816), Hannah (b. 1817), and Isabella (b. 1821) inherited the business. Her age is given as 43 in 1829.

She was appointed dressmaker and milliner to Queen Adelaide in 1830, a position she kept until 1837. She managed her Edinburgh shop at 52 North Castle Street, and her London shop at 16 Dover Street, Piccadilly, London. London became her primary base. Her daughters procured merchandise for her shop in Paris.

She was a traditional dressmaker, focused on custom dressmaking. She was active within the high-end dressmaking and millinery trade, which required a formal apprenticeship, in a time period when the textile industry was changing and readymade clothing became popular among the public, just before fashion designers became popular with the upper class.

In 1840, she became the official royal dressmaker to Queen Victoria. In the 1846 official calendar, Elizabeth Johnston had the title "Dress Maker Extraordinary" while Mary Bettans was called "Court Dress and Dress Maker". They were not the queen's only dressmaker, as she was also known to be the client of the House of Creed as well as John Redfern.

In 1841, she employed her four daughters and 8 other dressmakers as well as milliners, 4 female servants, and 2 male servants.
