= Mary Bettans =

British royal dressmaker for Queen Victoria

Mary Farnan Bettans (c. 1788 – 29 January 1859) was an English dressmaker. She was the official royal dressmaker of Queen Victoria and notably designed her iconic wedding dress in 1840.

== Life ==
Bettans was born in Southwark, Surrey. In 1817, she married Samuel Bettans at St Martin-in-the-Fields.

Mary Bettans had her establishment at 84 Jermyn Street in London. In 1841, her business was described as a "well conducted establishment" with journeywomen, in-door apprentices and improvers.

Bettans had a long association with Victoria, making mourning clothes for her on the death of her father in 1820, as well as her wedding dress twenty years later. In the 1846 official calendar, Elizabeth Johnston had the title "Dress Maker Extraordinary" while Mary Bettans was called "Court Dress and Dress Maker". They were not the queen's only dressmaker, as she was also known to be the client of the House of Creed as well as John Redfern.

She died in 1859 at Forty Hill, Enfield, aged 71.
