= Bride =

Woman who is about to be married

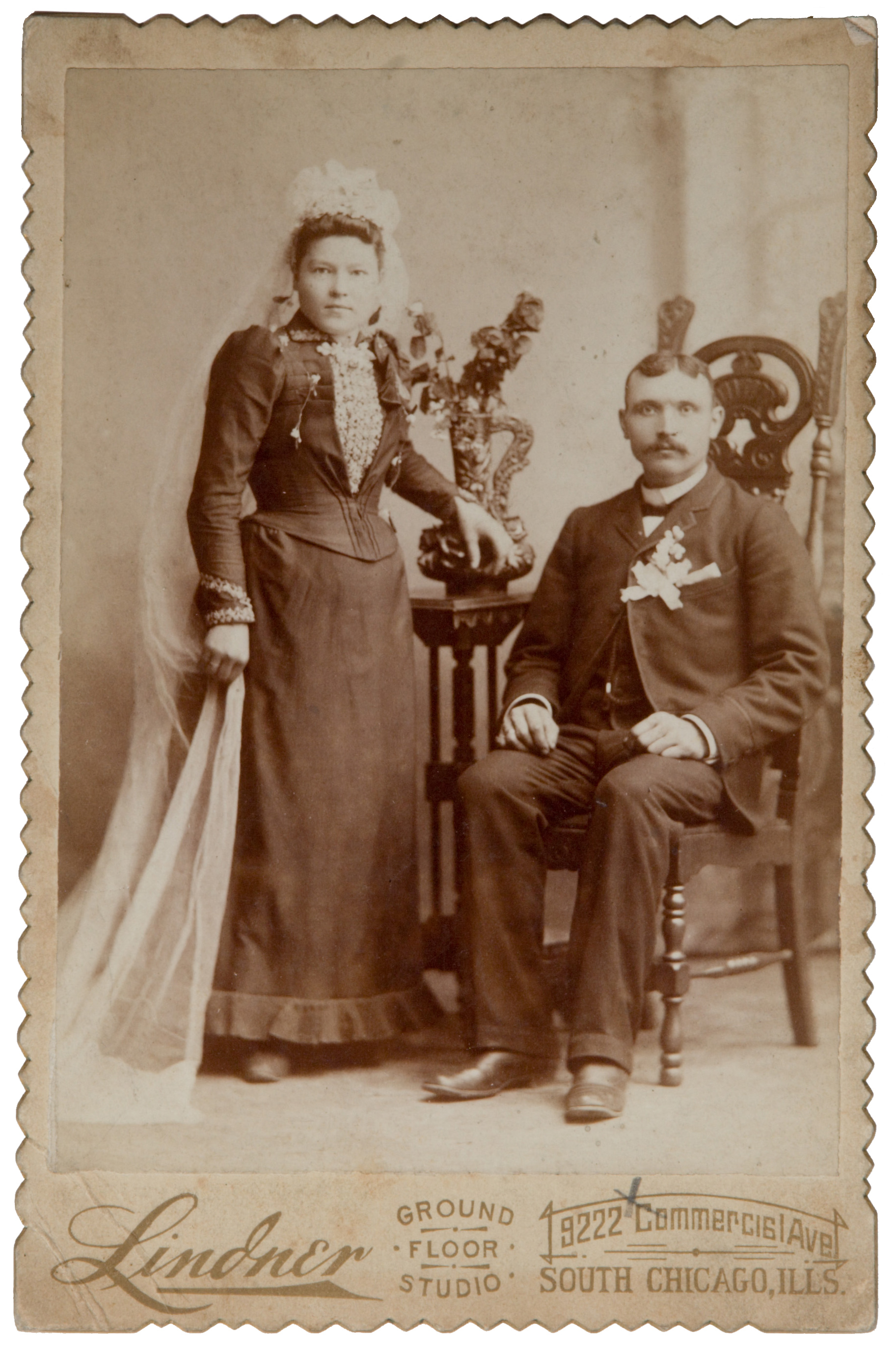
19th-century American bride (left), with the bridegroom (right).

A bride is a woman who is about to be married or who is a newlywed.

When marrying, the bride's future spouse is usually referred to as the bridegroom or just groom. In Western culture, a bride may be attended by a maid, or more bridesmaids.

The word "bride" has its roots in the Old English word bryd, which is shared with other Germanic languages. In Western countries, brides typically wear white wedding dresses, a tradition started by Queen Victoria. The white dress was once considered a symbol of luxury due to the difficulties in laundering delicate white clothing. Today, Western brides may wear white, cream, or ivory dresses, regardless of their number of marriages.

In non-Western countries, brides often wear national dress, with white wedding dresses being uncommon in Asian cultures as it symbolizes mourning and death. Red, on the other hand, represents vibrancy and health and is commonly worn by brides in many Asian cultures. Brides may also wear multiple outfits, as seen in some traditions in Japan, India, and parts of the Arab world.

Bridal jewelry holds cultural significance, such as wedding rings in Western cultures, chura (red and white bangles) in Punjabi Sikh culture, and mangalsutra in Hindu culture. Brides often wear veils and carry bouquets, prayer books, or other tokens. Wedding traditions have evolved over time, including the cake-eating and the bride-cup, both of which had symbolic meanings.

In Christianity, the term "Bride of Christ" typically refers to the Church, spiritually betrothed to Jesus Christ. The interpretation of this term varies among different denominations.

== Etymology ==
"brȳd," an Old Anglo-Saxon word

The word comes from the Old English 'bryd', a word shared with other Germanic languages. Its further origin is unknown.

== Attire ==
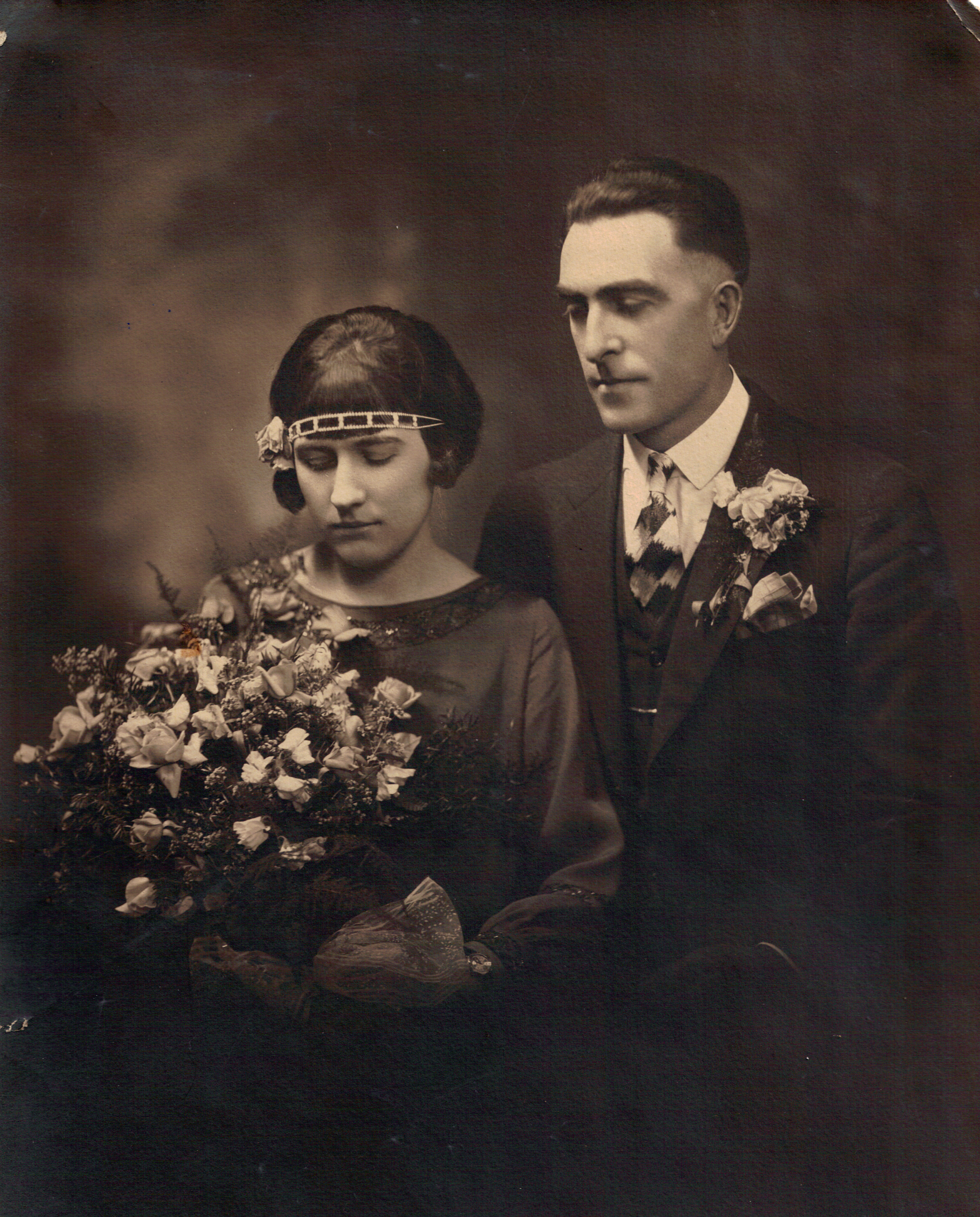
In the early 20th century, sometimes even later as here in 1926, it was not uncommon to see a bride wearing a darker-colored dress.

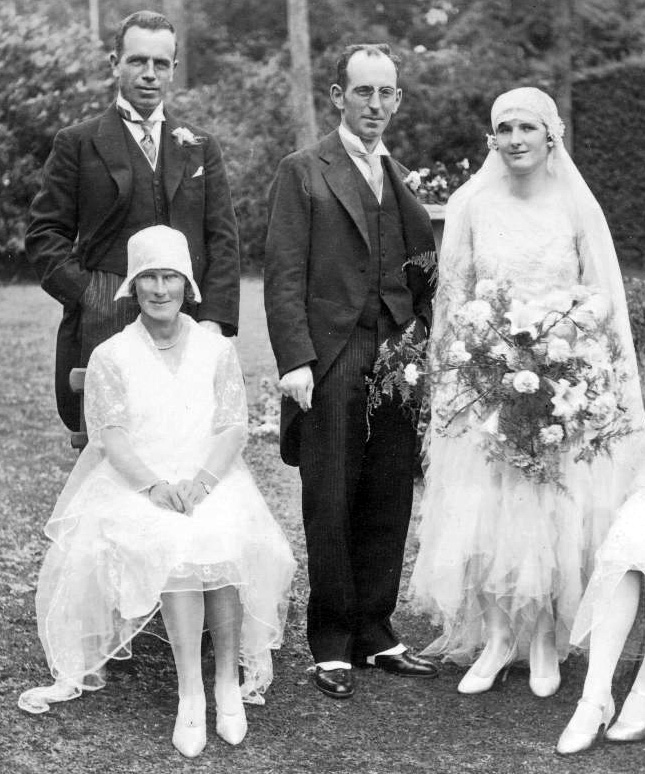
The woman to the far right is wearing a typical wedding dress from 1929. Up until the late 1930s, wedding dresses reflected the styles of the day. From that time onward, wedding dresses have been based on Victorian ballgowns.

In Europe and North America, the typical attire for a bride is a formal dress, and a veil. Usually, in the "white wedding" model, the bride's dress is bought specifically for the wedding, and is not in a style that could be worn for any subsequent events. Previously, until at least the middle of the 19th century, the bride generally wore her best dress, whatever color it was, or if the bride was well-off, she ordered a new dress in her favorite color and expected to wear it again.

For first marriages in Western countries, a white wedding dress is usually worn, a tradition started by Queen Victoria, who wore a white court dress for her wedding. Through the earlier parts of the 20th century, Western etiquette prescribed that a white dress should not be worn for subsequent marriages, since the wearing of white was mistakenly regarded by some as an ancient symbol of virginity, despite the fact that wearing white is a fairly recent development in wedding traditions, and its origin has more to do with conspicuous consumption from an era when a white dress was luxurious, even prodigal, because of difficulties with laundering delicate clothes. Today, Western brides frequently wear white, cream, or ivory dresses for any number of marriages; the color of the dress is not a comment on the bride's sexual history.

Outside of Western countries, brides most commonly wear national dress. White wedding dresses are particularly uncommon in Asian traditions, because white is the color of mourning and death in those cultures. In many Asian cultures, red is usual for brides, as this colour indicates vibrance and health and has over time been associated with brides. However, in modern times other colours may be worn, or Western styles preferred. Regardless of colour in most Asian cultures bridal clothes are highly decorative, often covered with embroidery, beading or gold. In some traditions brides may wear more than one outfit; this is true, for example, in Japan, parts of India, and, archaically, in parts of the Arab world.

Particular styles of jewelry are often associated with bridal wear; for example wedding rings in most Western cultures, or chura (red and white bangles) in Punjabi Sikh culture. Hindu brides are presented with a mangalsutra during the wedding ceremony, which has much of the same significance as a wedding ring in other parts of the world. Wedding jewelry has traditionally been used to demonstrate the value of the bride's dowry.

In addition to the gown, brides often wear a veil and carry a bouquet of flowers, a small heirloom such as a lucky coin, a prayer book, or other token. In Western countries, a bride may wear "something old, something new, something borrowed, and something blue"; a bridal purse (or money bag) is also common.

== History ==
The term bride appears in combination with many words, some of which are obsolete. Thus, "bridegroom" is a newly married man, and "bride-bell," "bride-banquet" are old equivalents of wedding-bells, wedding-breakfast. "Bridal" (from Bride-ale), originally the wedding-feast itself, has grown into a general descriptive adjective, the bridal ceremony. The bride-cake had its origin in the Roman confarreatio, an upper-class form of marriage, the essential features of whose ceremony were the eating by the couple of a cake made of salt, water and spelt flour, and the holding by the bride of three wheat-ears, a symbol of plenty.

The cake-eating went out of fashion, but the wheat ears survived. In the Middle Ages, they were either worn or carried by the bride. Eventually it became the custom for the young girls to assemble outside the church porch and throw grains of wheat over the bride, and afterwards a scramble for the grains took place. In time the wheat-grains came to be cooked into thin dry biscuits, which were broken over the bride's head, as is the custom in Scotland today, an oatmeal cake being used. In Elizabeth I's reign these biscuits began to take the form of small rectangular cakes made of eggs, milk, sugar, currants and spices. Every wedding guest had one at least, and the whole collection were thrown at the bride the instant she crossed the threshold. Those that lighted on her head or shoulders were most prized by the scramblers. At last these cakes became amalgamated into a large one that took on its full glories of almond paste and ornaments during Charles II's time. But even today in rural parishes, e.g. north Notts, wheat is thrown over the bridal couple with the cry "Bread for life and pudding for ever," expressive of a wish that the newly wed may be always affluent. The throwing of rice, a very ancient custom but one later than the wheat, is symbolical of the wish that the bridal may be fruitful.

The bride-cup was the bowl or loving cup in which the bridegroom pledged the bride, and she him. The custom of breaking this wine-cup, after the bridal couple had drained its contents, is common to both the Greek Christians and members of the Jewish faith. It is thrown against a wall or trodden under foot. The phrase "bride-cup" was also sometimes used of the bowl of spiced wine prepared at night for the bridal couple. Bride-favours, anciently called bride-lace, were at first pieces of gold, silk or other lace, used to bind up the sprigs of rosemary formerly worn at weddings. These took later the form of bunches of ribbons, which were at last metamorphosed into rosettes.

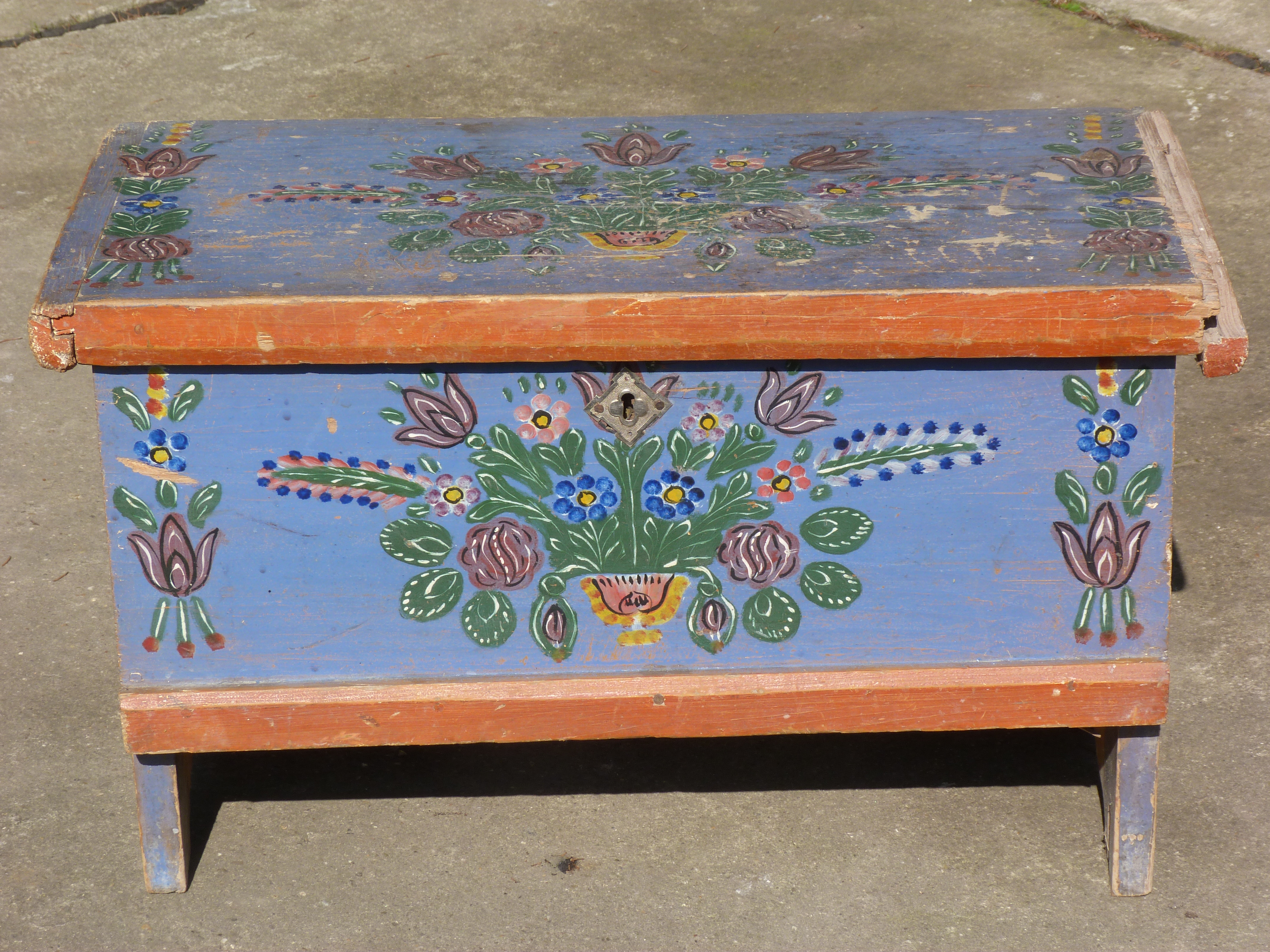
Hungarian bride's crate

The bride-wain, the wagon in which the bride was driven to her new home, gave its name to the weddings of any poor deserving couple, who drove a "wain" round the village, collecting small sums of money or articles of furniture towards their housekeeping. These were called bidding-weddings, or bid-ales, which were in the nature of "benefit" feasts. So general is still the custom of "bidding-weddings" in Wales, that printers usually keep the form of invitation in type. Sometimes as many as six hundred couples will walk in the bridal procession.

The bride's wreath is a Christian substitute for the gilt coronet all Jewish brides wore. The crowning of the bride is still observed by the Russians, and the Calvinists of Holland and Switzerland. The wearing of orange blossoms is said to have started with the Saracens, who regarded them as emblems of fecundity. It was introduced into Europe by the Crusaders. The bride's veil is the modern form of the flammeum or large yellow veil that completely enveloped the Greek and Roman brides during the ceremony. Such a covering is still in use among the Jews and the Persians.

The "bride's crate" was the bride's container to gather all the things for the wedding in Hungary. Once all the underwear and clothes were finished, the girl was ready for marriage.

== Religion ==
=== Christianity ===
In Christianity, bride, the Lamb's wife, or the Bride of Christ, is a term that generally describes the Church (followers of Christ) spiritually betrothed to Jesus Christ. The term is found in related verses in the Bible that describe a woman, in the Gospels, the Book of Revelation, the Epistles and related verses in the Old Testament. Sometimes, the Bride is implied by calling Jesus a bridegroom to the Church. For over 1500 years, the Church was identified as the bride betrothed to Christ. However, there are instances of the interpretation varying from church to church. Most believe that it always refers to the church. In the Church of Jesus Christ of Latter-day Saints, the bride must always wear a white dress when getting married in the church temple, and nothing but white is allowed.

== Examples of bridal garments ==
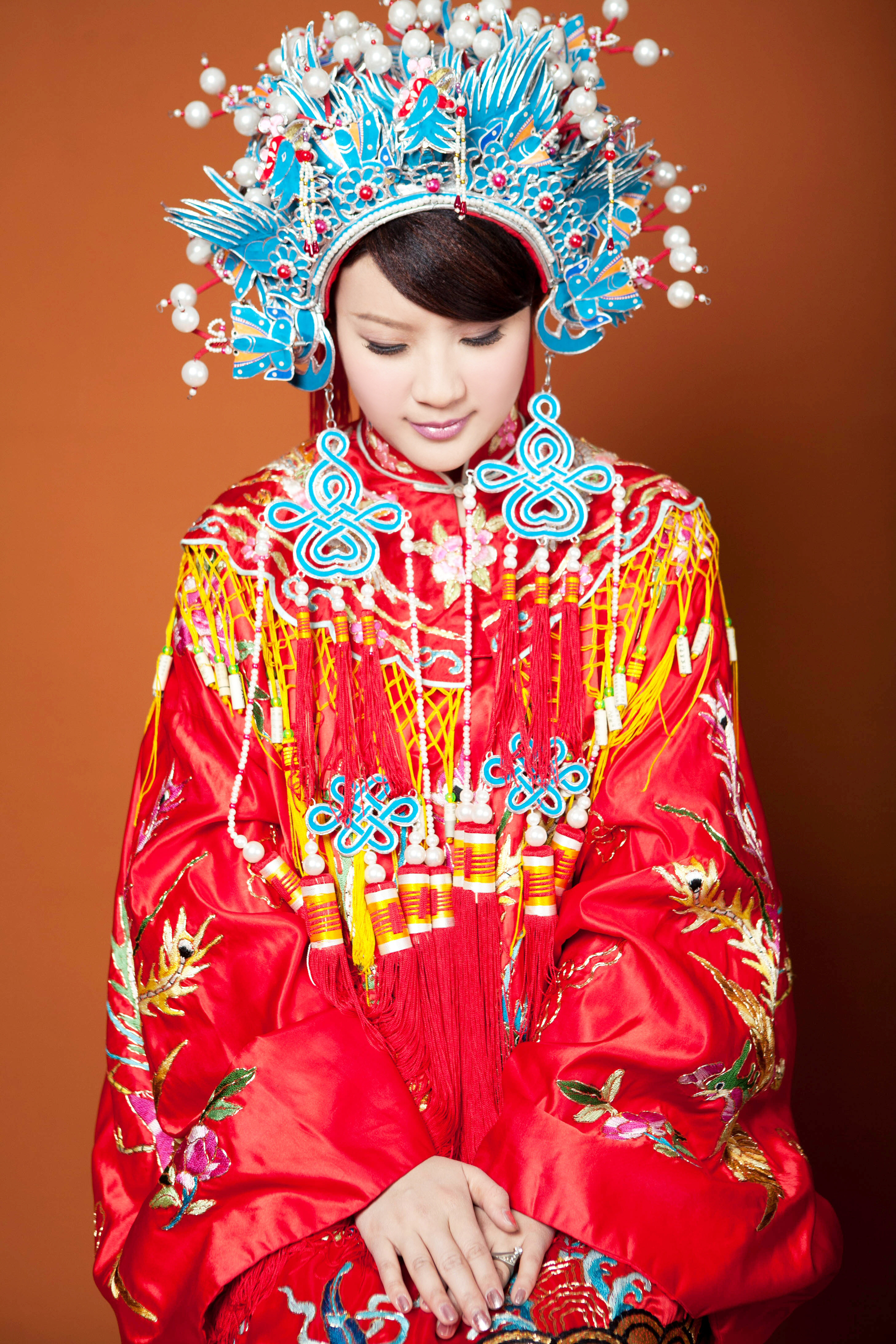
Qing dynasty-style Chinese wedding dress.

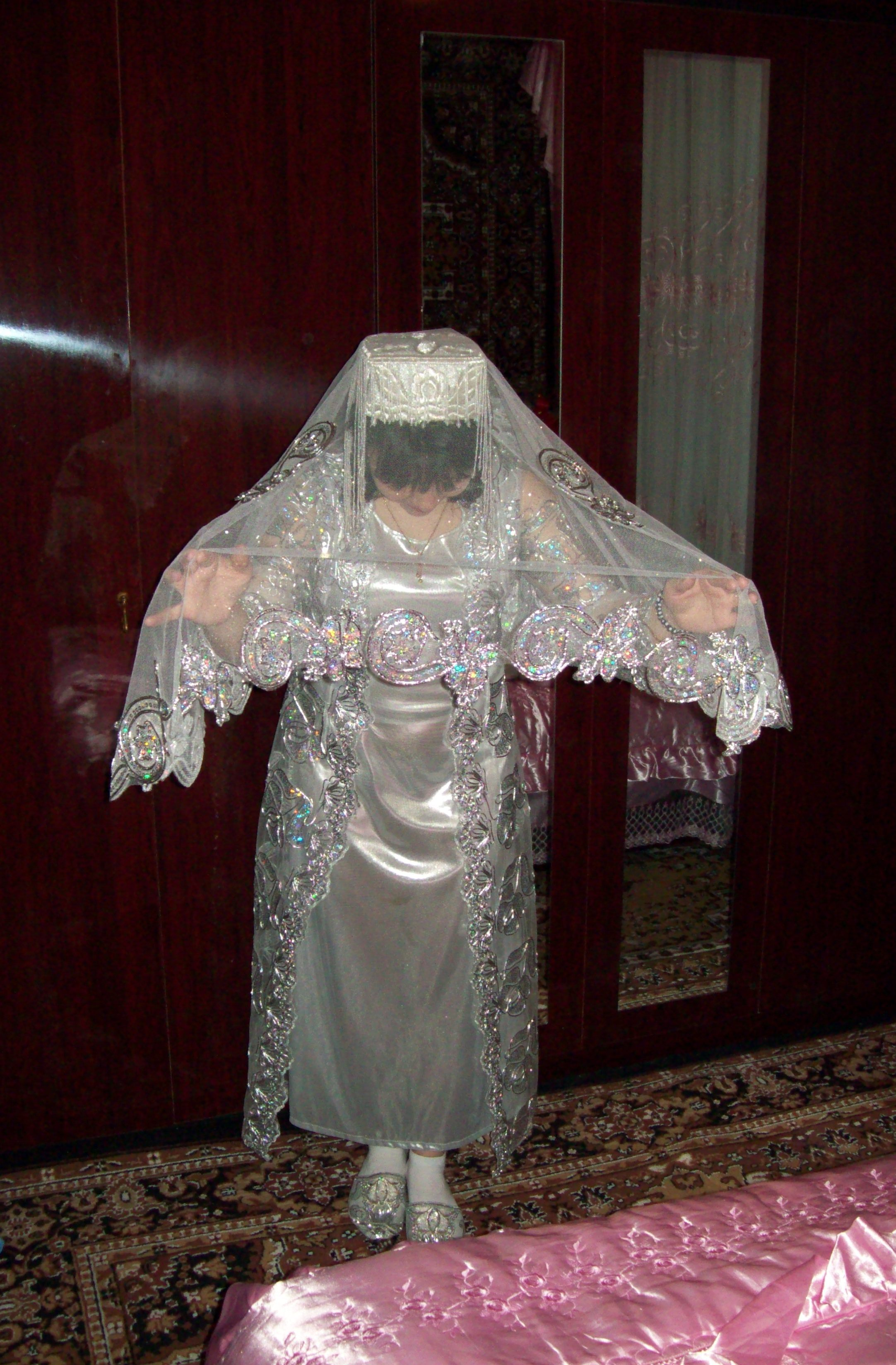
Uzbek bride (Tashkent).

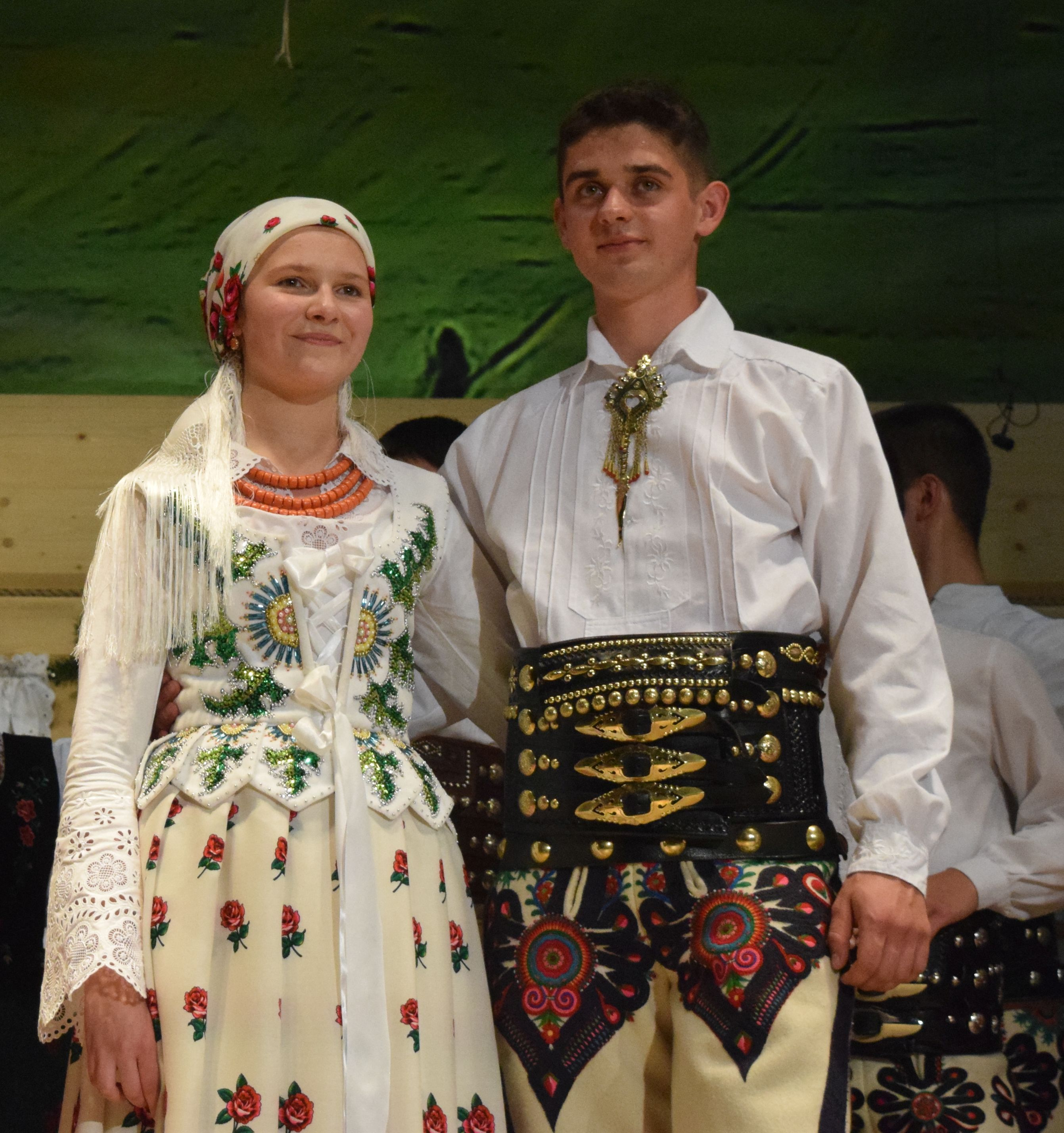
Bride and groom in traditional highlander Podhale costume, Poland

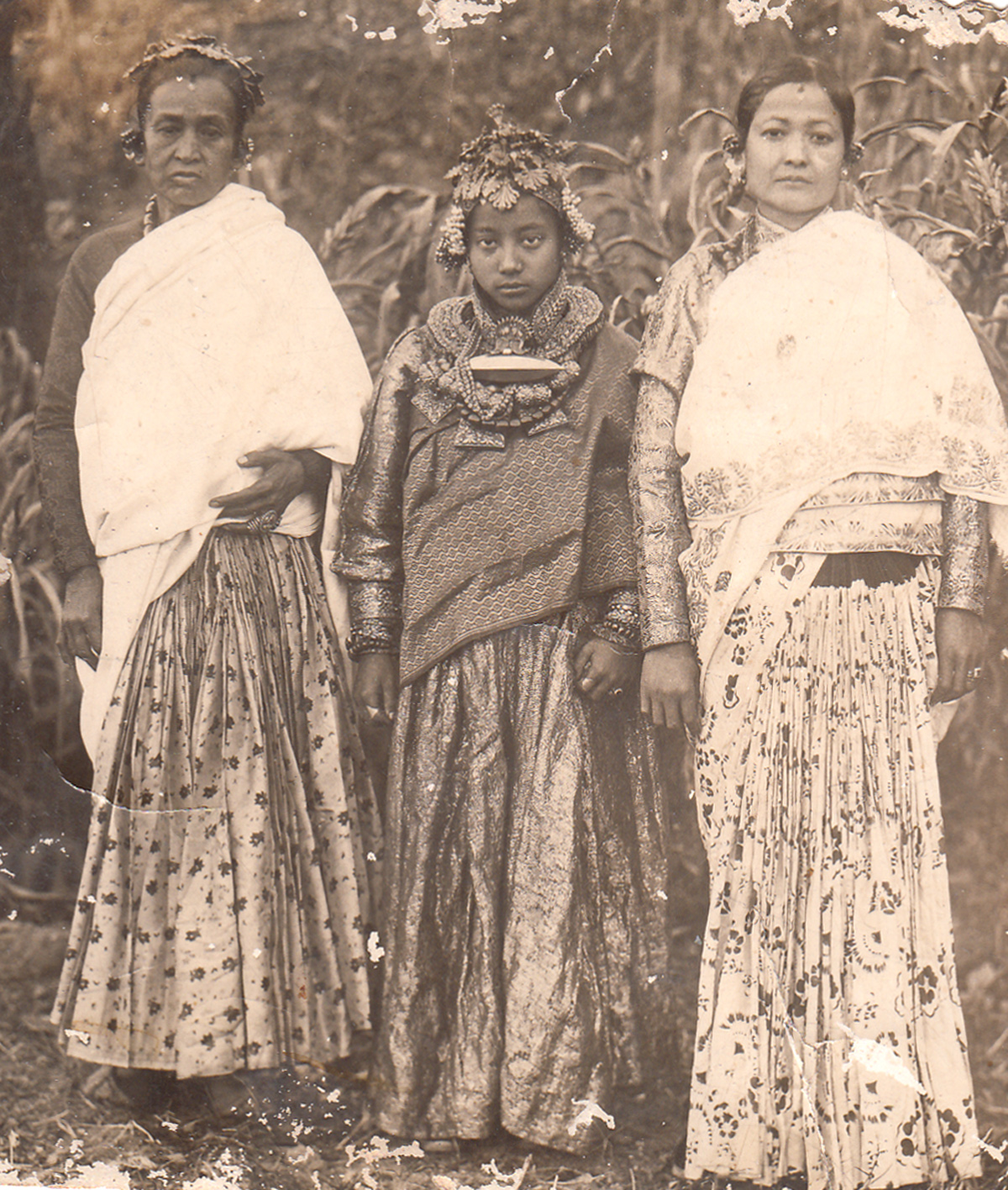
Newar bride flanked by two women in 1941.

Scandinavian bride (bottom right) in 1876.

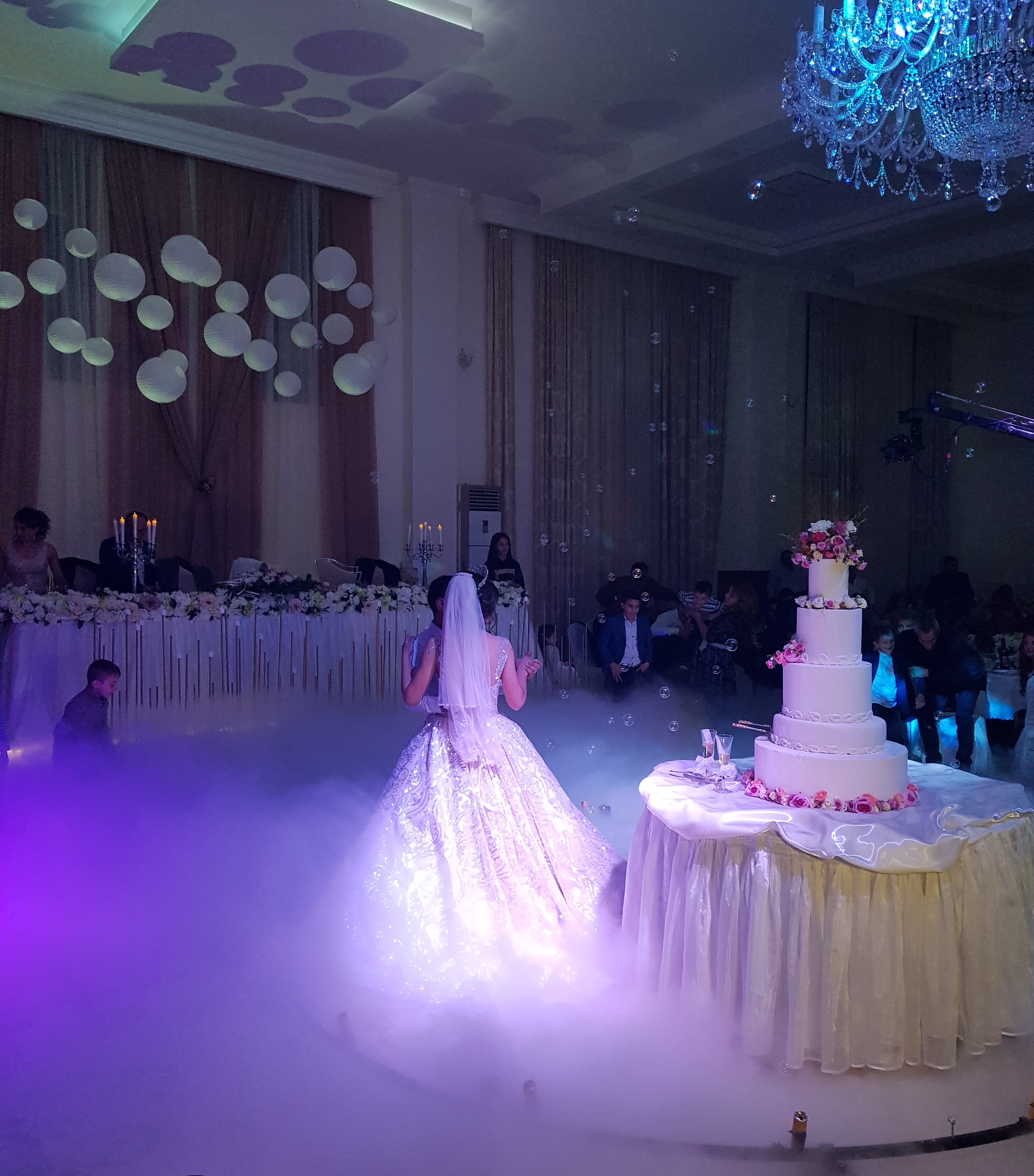
Armenian wedding, bride and groom

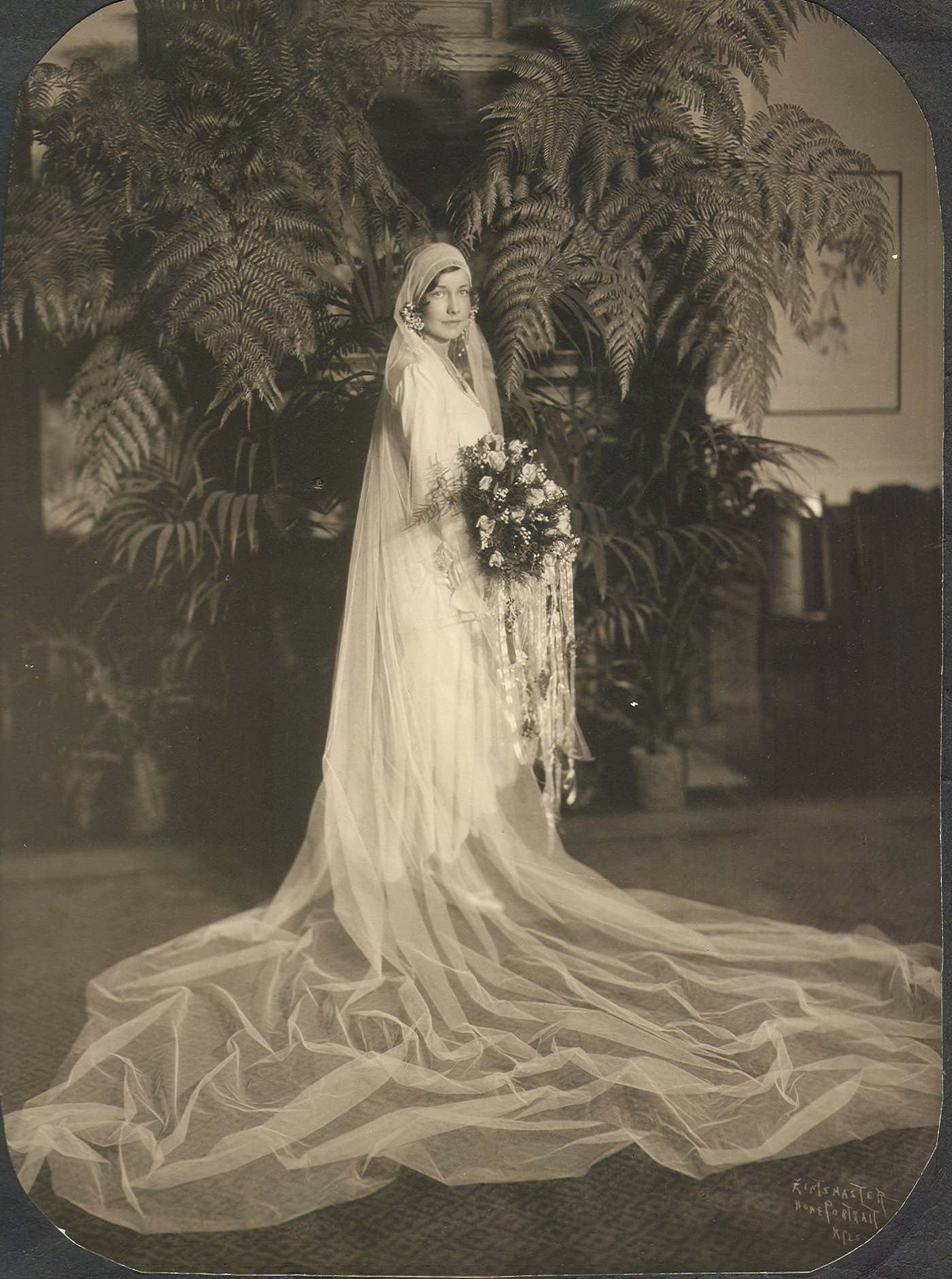
A bride in an elaborate wedding dress, US, 1929.
