= Honiton lace =

Type of bobbin lace produced in Honiton, Devon

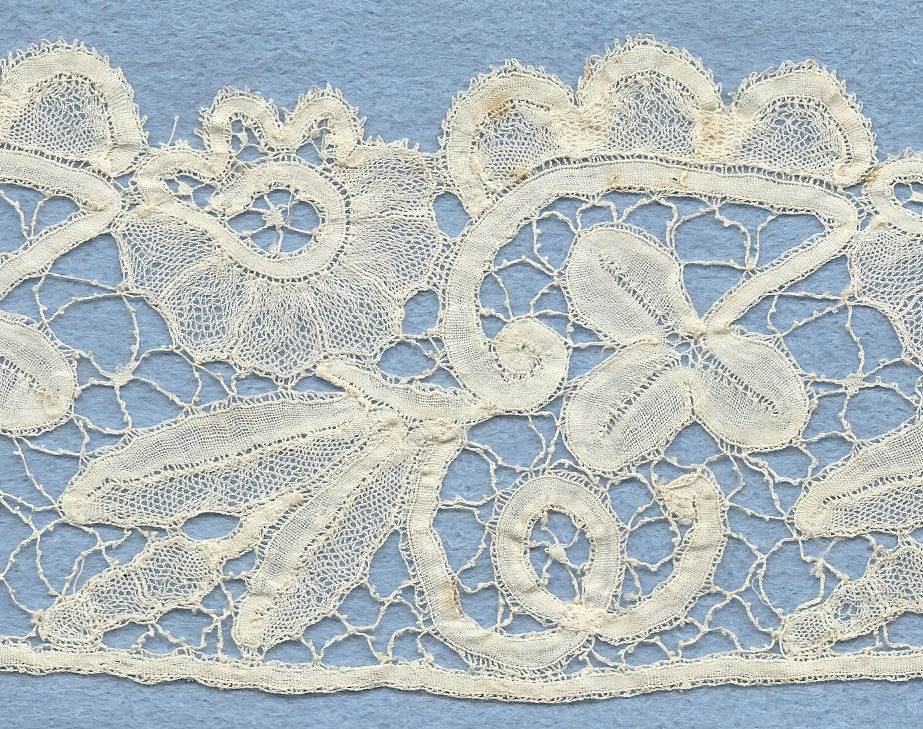
Honiton lace edging

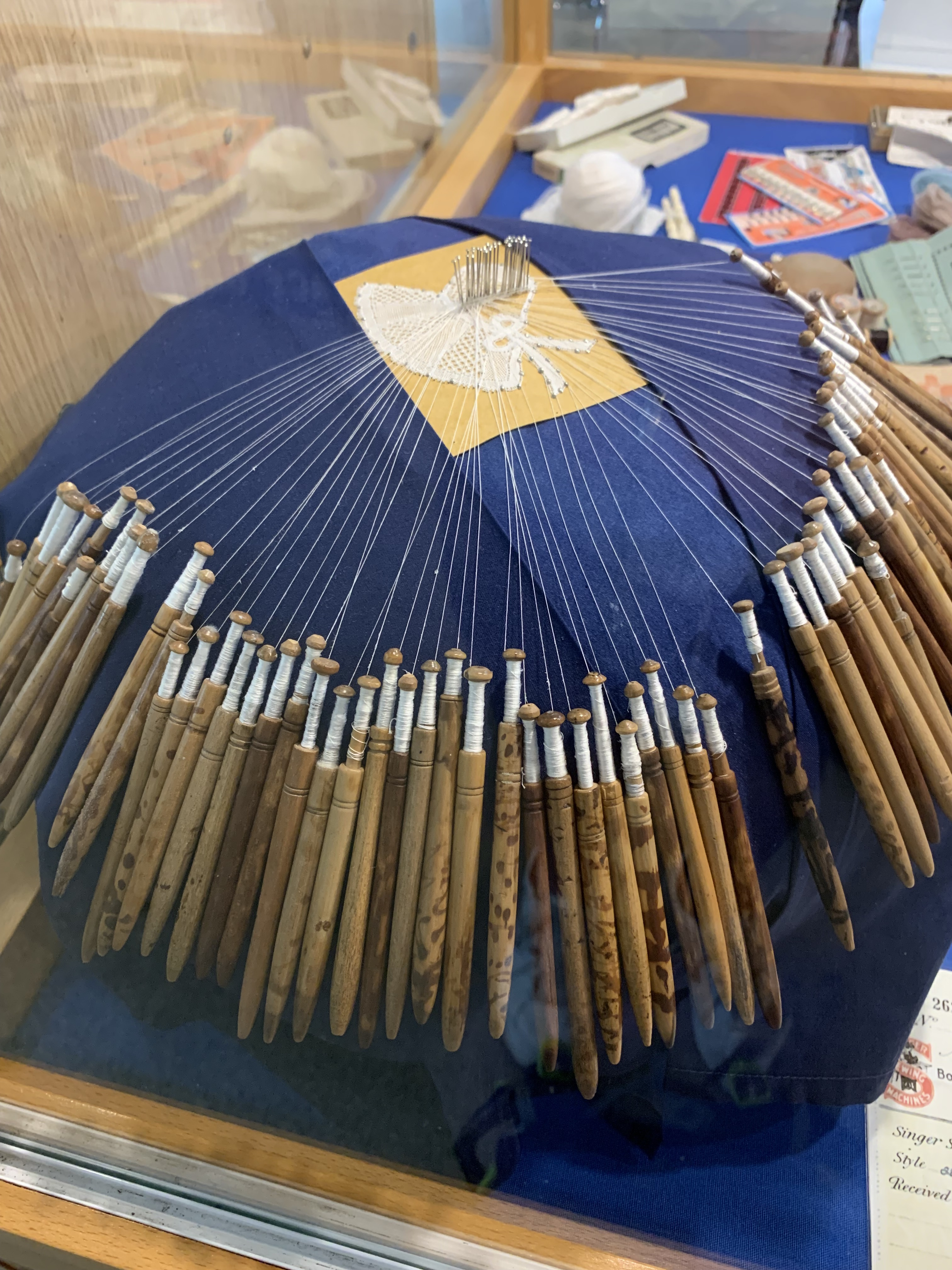
Honiton lace pillow and bobbins

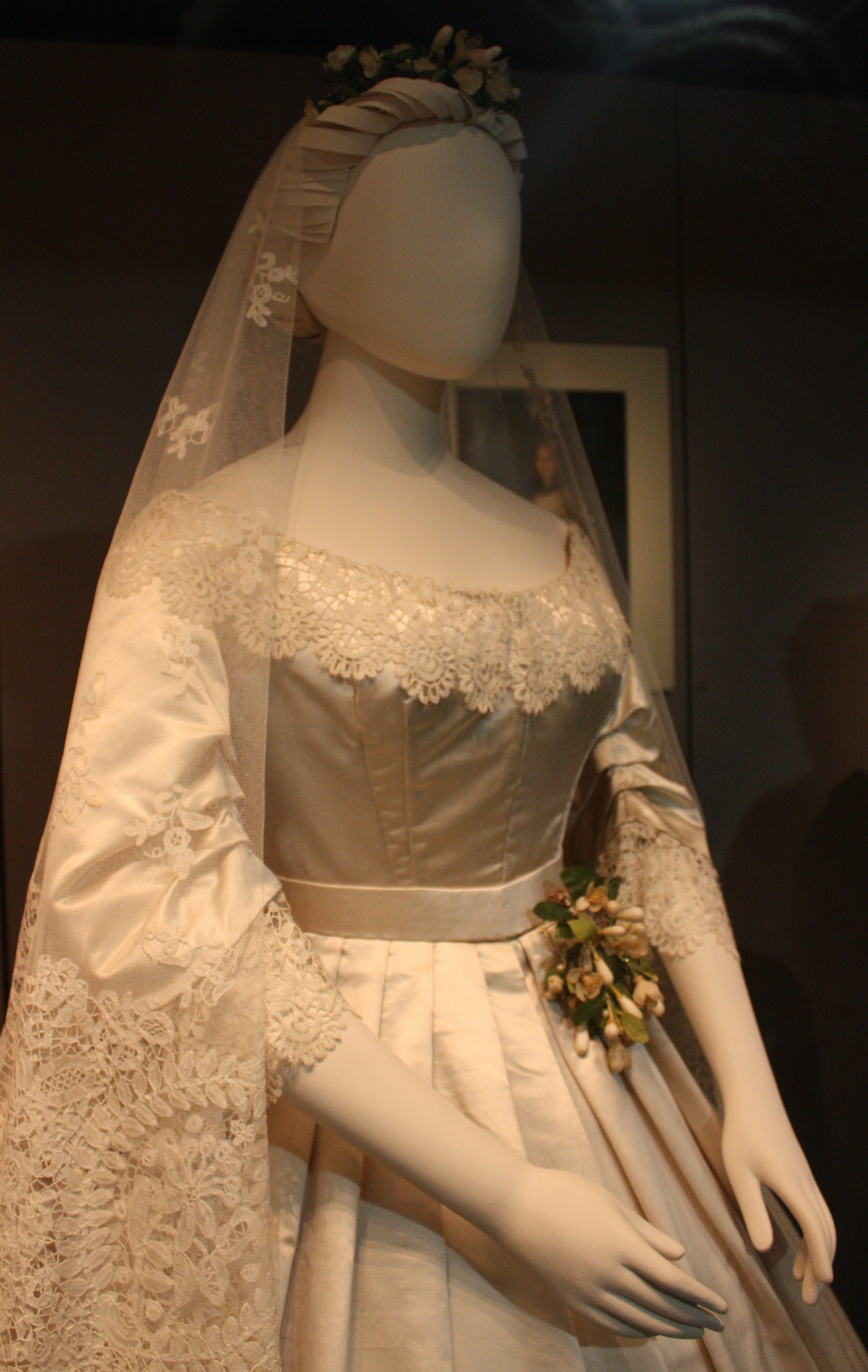
A wedding dress dating to 1865, trimmed with Honiton lace

Honiton lace is a type of bobbin lace made in Honiton, Devon, in the United Kingdom. Historical Honiton lace designs focused on scrollwork and depictions of natural objects such as flowers and leaves.

== Characteristics ==
Honiton lace is a part lace. Its ornate motifs and complex patterns are created separately, before being sewn into a net ground. Common motifs include daisies, roses, shamrocks, ivy leaves, butterflies, lilies, camellias, convolvulus, poppies, briony, antwerp diamonds, trefoils, ferns, and acorns.

== Origin and history ==
The art of making lace is rumoured to have been brought to Honiton, England by Flemish refugees in the mid-to-late 16th century. An old tombstone in the town is inscribed with information about one James Rodge who is described as a "bone lace seller" who died in 1617; it is not known whether he emigrated from Flanders or not.

In the early period (approx. 1620–1800), sprigs of various designs were worked separately from the net ground by hand, then put together near the end of production. Later (approx. 1800–1840), handmade Honiton lace became obsolete in light of the invention of machine-made net, which was much cheaper to produce. Historian Emily Jackson describes the design changes fostered by the convenience of this approach:

"There was a curious wave of careless designing and inartistic method during the time of this depression, and ugly patterns show 'turkey tails,' 'frying pans,' and hearts. Not a leaf, nor a flower, was copied from nature."

Handmade lacework had a resurgence in popularity in the 19th century when Queen Victoria ordered a Honiton lace bridal dress. The revival happened so quickly, and demand was so great, that a cheaper-quality lace was produced in large quantities. Due to the massive demand, this cheaper work had simpler designs due to the necessary speed of production. Defining designs of lace at this time were "leaves, flowers, [and] scrolls ... [that] look as natural as possible."

19th century Honiton lace incorporates a variety of stitches, including: whole stitch, stem stitch, lace stitch, fibre stitch, long plaitings, square plaitings, broad/cucumber plaitings, Honiton ground, star ground, Dame Joan ground, buckle stitch, Flemish stitch, turn-stitch, chequer stitch, fibre stitch, and Antwerp diamond stitch.

== See also ==
- Lace school
