= Wedding dress of Queen Victoria =

Dress worn by Queen Victoria at her wedding to Prince Albert in 1840

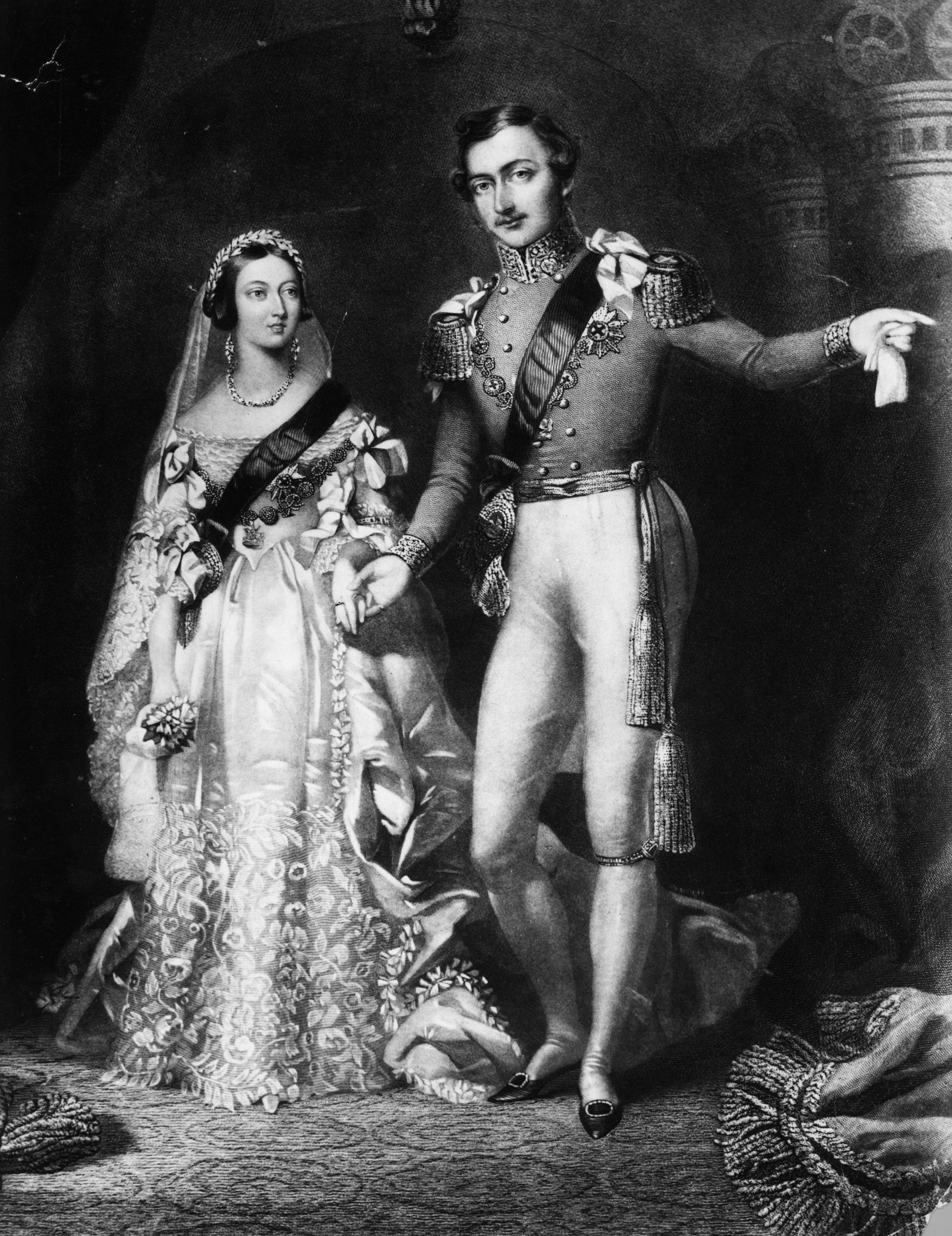
- Queen Victoria and Prince Albert on their return from the marriage service at St James's Palace, London, 10 February 1840. Engraved by S Reynolds after F Lock.
- Designer: Mary Bettans (dress); William Dyce (lace)
- Year: 1840
- Material: Satin, Honiton lace

Queen Victoria of the United Kingdom married Prince Albert of Saxe-Coburg and Gotha on 10 February 1840 in the Chapel Royal, St. James's Palace. She wore a white wedding dress made from heavy silk satin, which made her look more like a bride and less like a queen. The English-made Honiton lace used for her wedding dress proved an important boost to Devon lace-making. Queen Victoria is erroneously credited with starting the tradition of white weddings and white bridal gowns. Perhaps because of the extensive press coverage of the wedding, she may be considered to have popularised the white wedding gown, but other royals and other women of her time were already wearing white.

== Design ==
Queen Victoria described her choice of dress in her journal: "I wore a white satin dress, with a deep flounce of Honiton lace, an imitation of an old design. My jewels were my Turkish diamond necklace & earrings & dear Albert's beautiful sapphire brooch."

All royal clothing is deliberately "symbolic" – or semiotic – to some degree. Lucy Worsley interprets the simple white dress as Victoria marrying as a woman rather than as "Her Majesty the Queen." Kay Staniland and Santina M. Levey (and the Dreamstress blog) claim that the salient article from Victoria's wedding dress was the Honiton lace, which was designed to be white and which the dress showcased – requiring, then, that her dress be white.

She designed the dresses of the bridesmaids, which were also white. "Onlookers commenting on the wedding and Victoria's dress," Worsley says, said that Victoria and her party looked like "village girls, ... rather than a monarch and her ladies in waiting." Others saw the simplicity of the wedding dress similarly, though less negatively.

=== The Gown ===
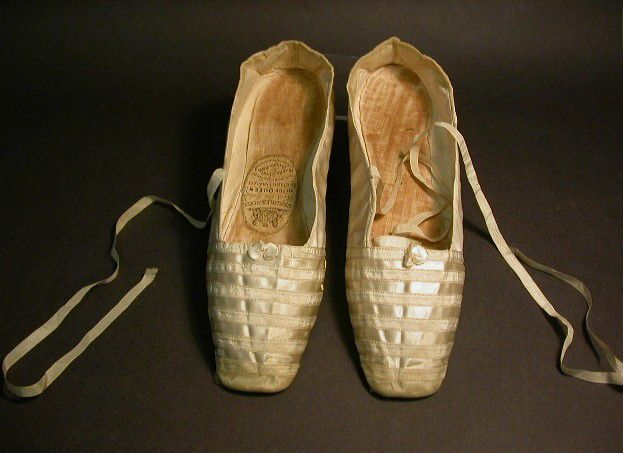
Queen Victoria's White Satin Wedding Shoes (Northampton Shoe Collection, Northampton Museum & Art Gallery www.northampton.gov.uk/museums)

Victoria's plain satin gown was made from fabric woven in Spitalfields, east London, and trimmed with a deep flounce of hand-made Honiton lace. The Royal Collection shows three views of Victoria's wedding dress, which comprises a "pointed boned bodice lined with silk, elbow length gathered sleeves; deep lace flounces at neck and sleeves and plain untrimmed skirt en suite, gathered into [the] waist with unpressed pleats." (The flounce at the neck can also be called a bertha.) Even with the flounces and trim of lace and orange blossoms, Victoria's gown had fewer decorative elements than most formal dresses or than haute couture.

The train of the dress measured 18 feet (5.5 m) in length, although it was too short for the number of bridesmaids to carry without tripping on each other's dresses and "kicking each other's heels." The slippers Victoria (right) wore matched her dress and were likely made from the same fabric.

==== The Colour of the Dress ====
The actual wedding dress is now cream coloured, although Victoria recorded in her journal that her gown was white, as did the newspapers. Silk cocoon fibres are naturally various shades of off white, so the silk fabric has to be bleached, but it yellows over time.

Women's court dress – including what debutantes wore when presented to the monarch – was traditionally white, and by 1840 white dresses were gaining popularity in the middle classes as well, especially in cotton. According to Kate Strasdin, "white and silver had become firmly associated with wedding attire for those who could afford it" by the early 18th century, and by the mid 19th century they were increasingly popular in Europe, North America and the UK. For example, in the US upper-middle-class Frances Todd wore a cream-coloured satin wedding dress on 21 May 1839, the same dress her sister Mary Todd wore when she married Abraham Lincoln on 4 November 1842. Sophie of Württembert, Queen of the Netherlands wore white for her wedding on 18 June 1839. The Metropolitan Museum of Art holds several English, European and U.S. white wedding dresses made from silk, wool or cotton in the late 1830s. All of these dresses predate Victoria's.

While it was not uncommon as a dress colour in 1840, the colour white suggested wealth and status, even for middle-class wearers, because the world was sooty and white required constant maintenance, but it did not suggest royalty or sovereignty.

=== The Lace ===
Queen Victoria's dress was decorated with a deep lace flounce, which is a "band of fabric or lace that is fluted [sewn into narrow pleats] and attached to [the] garment by its upper edge only." The neck treatment is a smaller flounce, and the plain satin skirt may have been covered with a larger flounce, perhaps the one measuring 4 yards by 27 inches, or perhaps it was the veil that was 4 yards by 27 inches. The flounce over the skirt would have been stitched to the waist. Because Victoria was so short, a 27-inch-skirt length is not unrealistic.

The veil was made of the same lace pattern as the flounce of the dress. Victoria ordered her handmade lace from East Devon, using a British rather than Belgian or French lace. The laces made in East Devon were "the finest British bobbin laces." Although generally the lace is called Honiton lace, Queen Victoria's was "made by lacemakers in the coastal village of Beer," "supervised by a Miss Jane Bidney." The queen's patronage of the Devon lacemakers provided support for English industry, particularly the cottage industry for lace, at a time when Brussels lace was more desirable to those who wore haute couture.

The lace was designed by "the Pre-Raphaelite artist William Dyce," head of the then Government School of Design (later known as the Royal College of Art), and mounted on a white satin dress probably made by Mary Bettans. The handmade lace motifs were appliquéd onto machine-made cotton net.

=== The Jewellery ===
Orange blossoms – "a ubiquitous addition to the mid-century wedding aesthetic" – also trimmed the dress and made up a wreath, which Victoria wore instead of a tiara over her veil, choosing perhaps to be seen as a bride rather than a monarch. Victoria's jewellery consisted of a necklace and earrings made of diamonds presented to her by the Sultan of Turkey, and a large sapphire cluster brooch given to her by Albert the day before (the jewellery can be seen in the Winterhalter 1847 portrait, below left).

== After the wedding ==
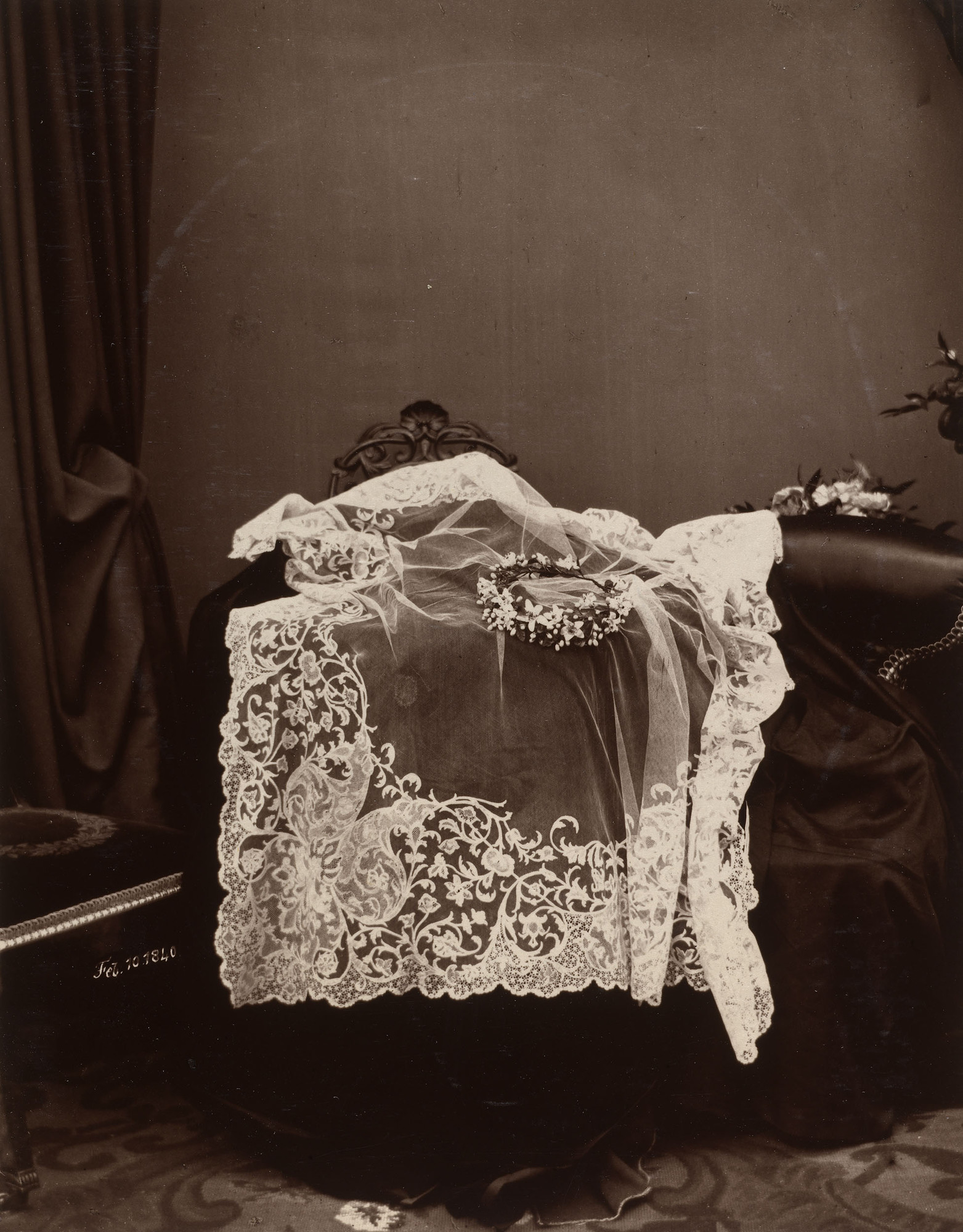
Carbon print of the Honiton lace veil and wreath decorated with orange blossoms worn by Queen Victoria on her wedding day.

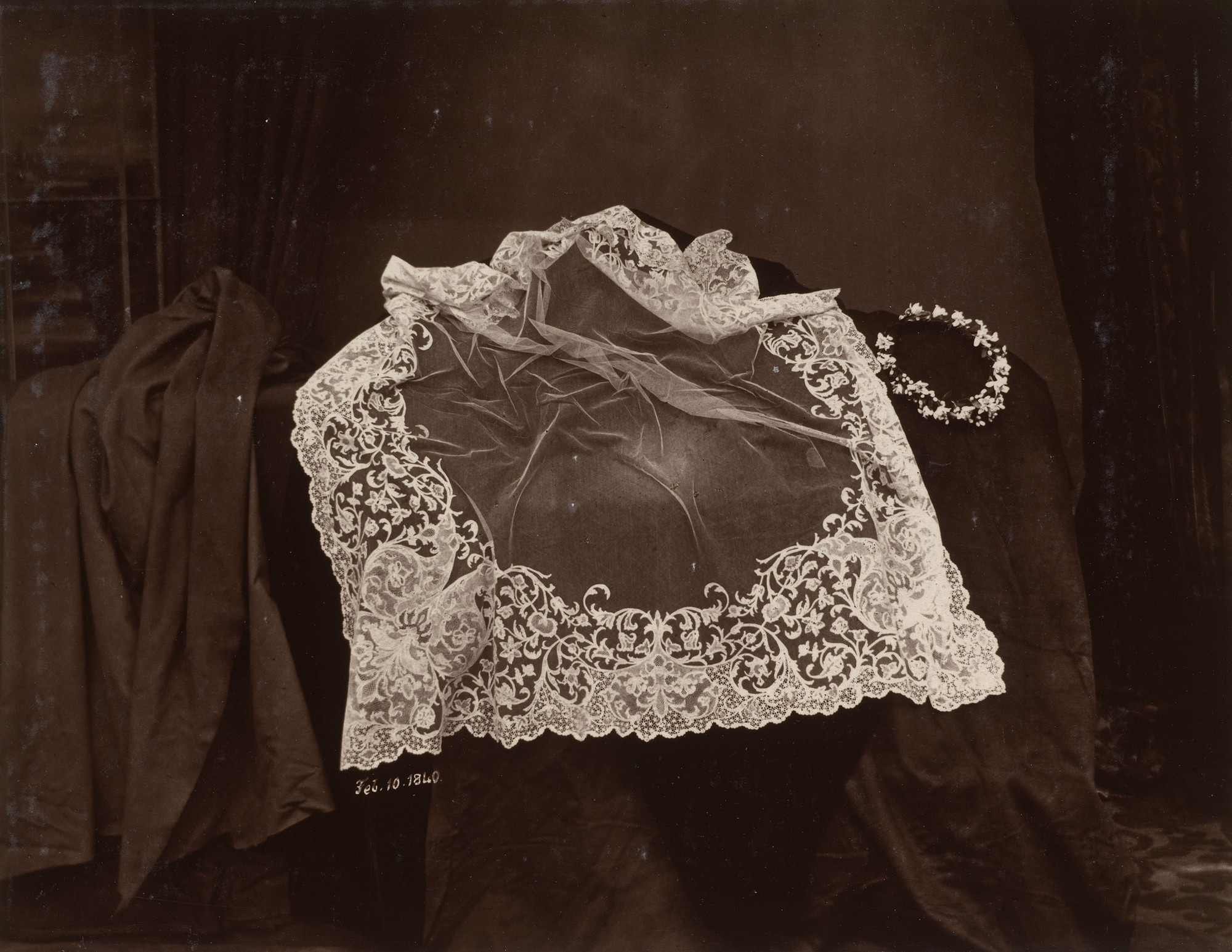
Another carbon print of the veil showing more lace detail on one edge and a clear view of orange blossoms wreath. Photos taken c.1889–91, from Queen Victoria's Private Negatives, Vol. II c. 1850.

=== The Preserved wedding lace ===
As a mark of support for the Honiton industry, Victoria used her wedding lace and other Honiton laces for the rest of her life, and she had her children do the same.

Victoria revisited the lace-makers to create the royal christening gown worn by her children, including Albert Edward (the future Edward VII). This gown was worn for the christening of all subsequent royal babies until the baptism of James, Viscount Severn in 2008, when a replica was used for the first time. Victoria also wore her wedding lace mounted on the dresses she wore to the christenings of her nine children (except for Albert Edward's, for which she wore her Garter robes).

She also wore her Honiton wedding lace to the marriage ceremonies of two of her children, her eldest daughter, Victoria, in 1858, and her youngest son, Leopold, in 1882. Her youngest daughter, Princess Beatrice, was permitted to wear it as part of her own wedding gown in 1885. Victoria also wore the lace to the wedding of her grandson George (the future George V) to Mary of Teck in 1893, and for her Diamond Jubilee official photograph in 1897 (below, left). She insisted her daughters order Honiton lace for their wedding ensembles.

When Victoria died, she was buried with her wedding veil over her face. In 2012 it was reported that while the dress itself had been conserved and displayed at Kensington Palace that year, the surviving lace was now too fragile to move from storage.

== Paintings and Photographs ==
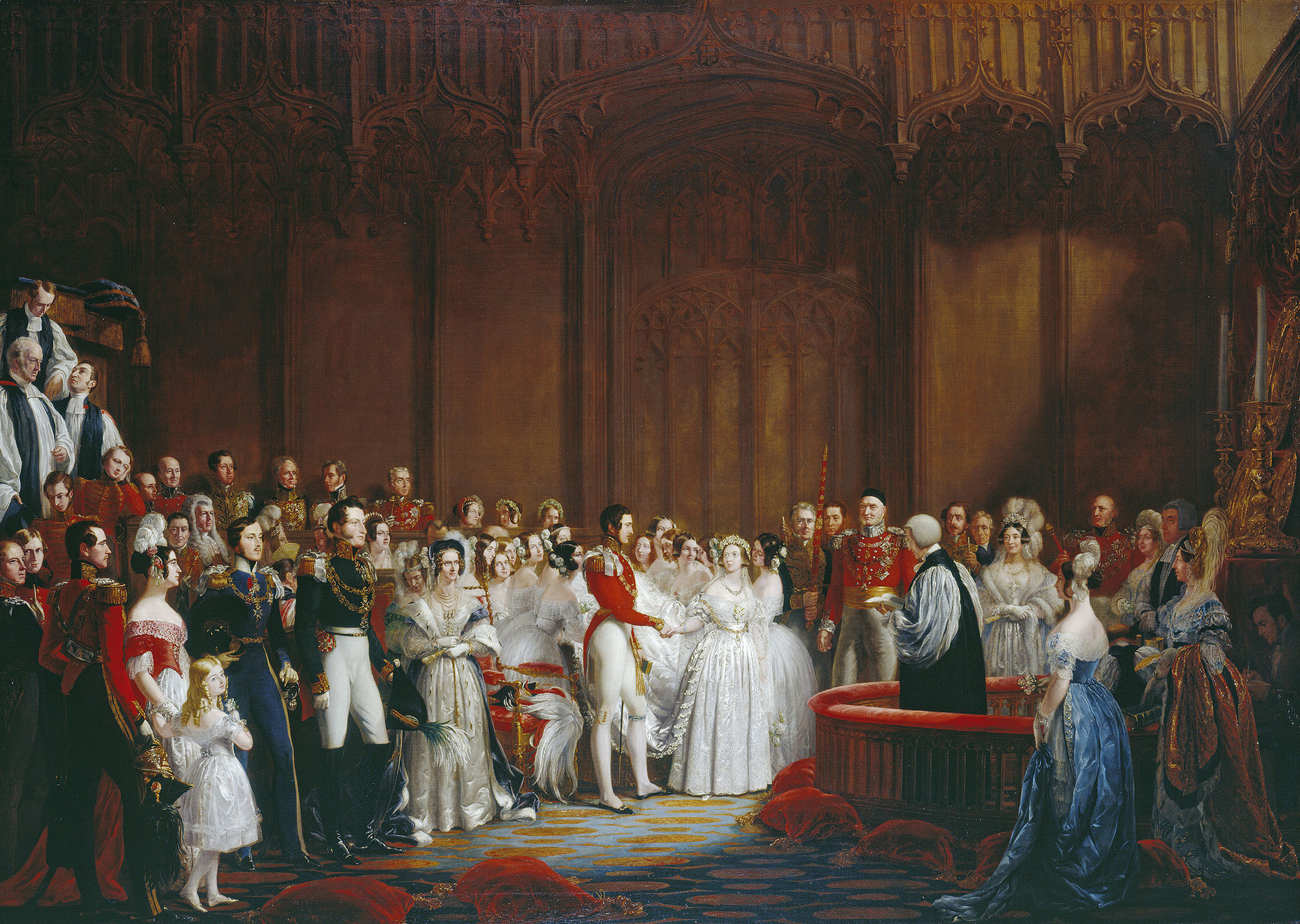
Hayter's 1842 depiction of the moment Victoria and Albert clasp hands

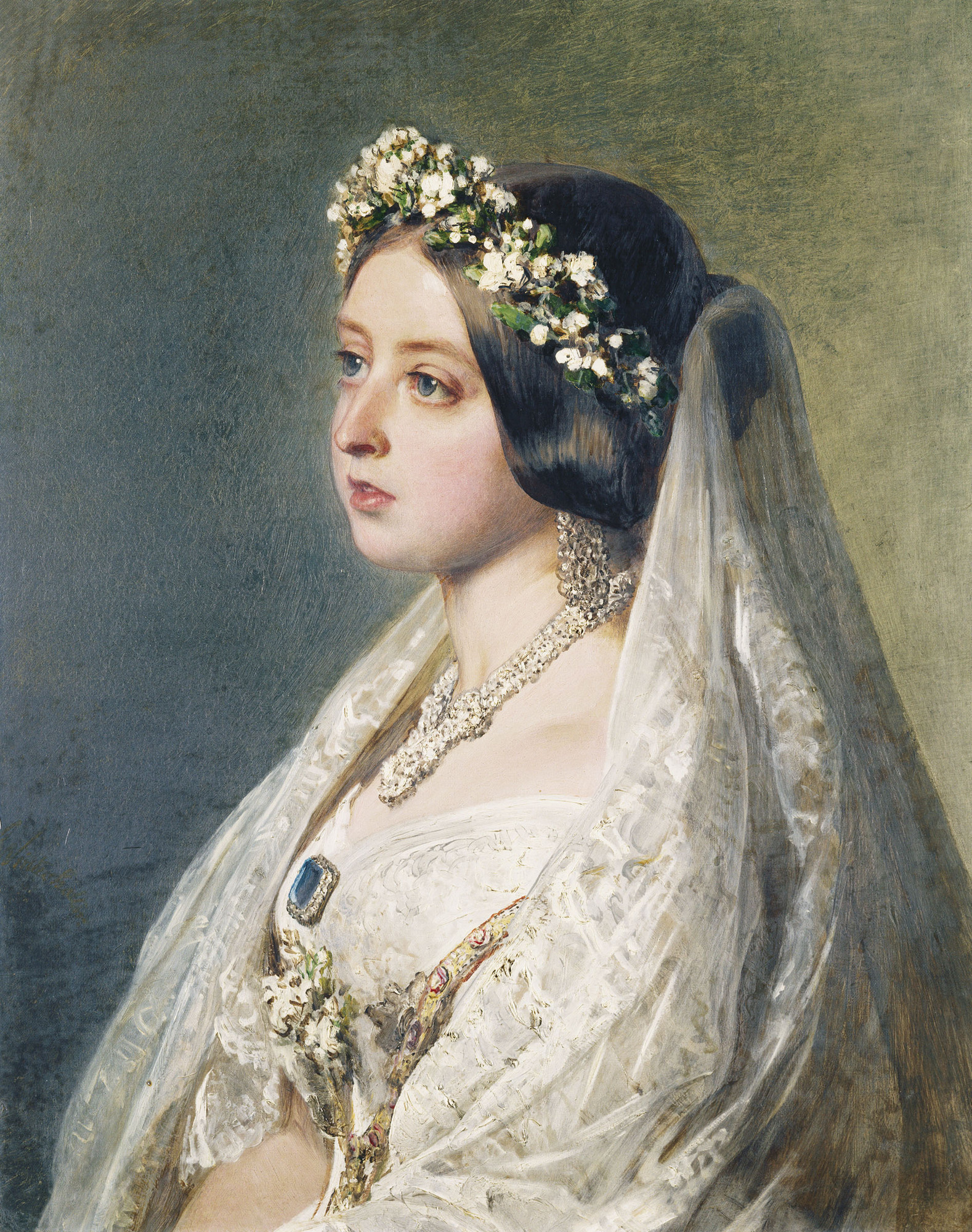
Portrait painted by Franz Xaver Winterhalter, 1847, as an anniversary present for Prince Albert

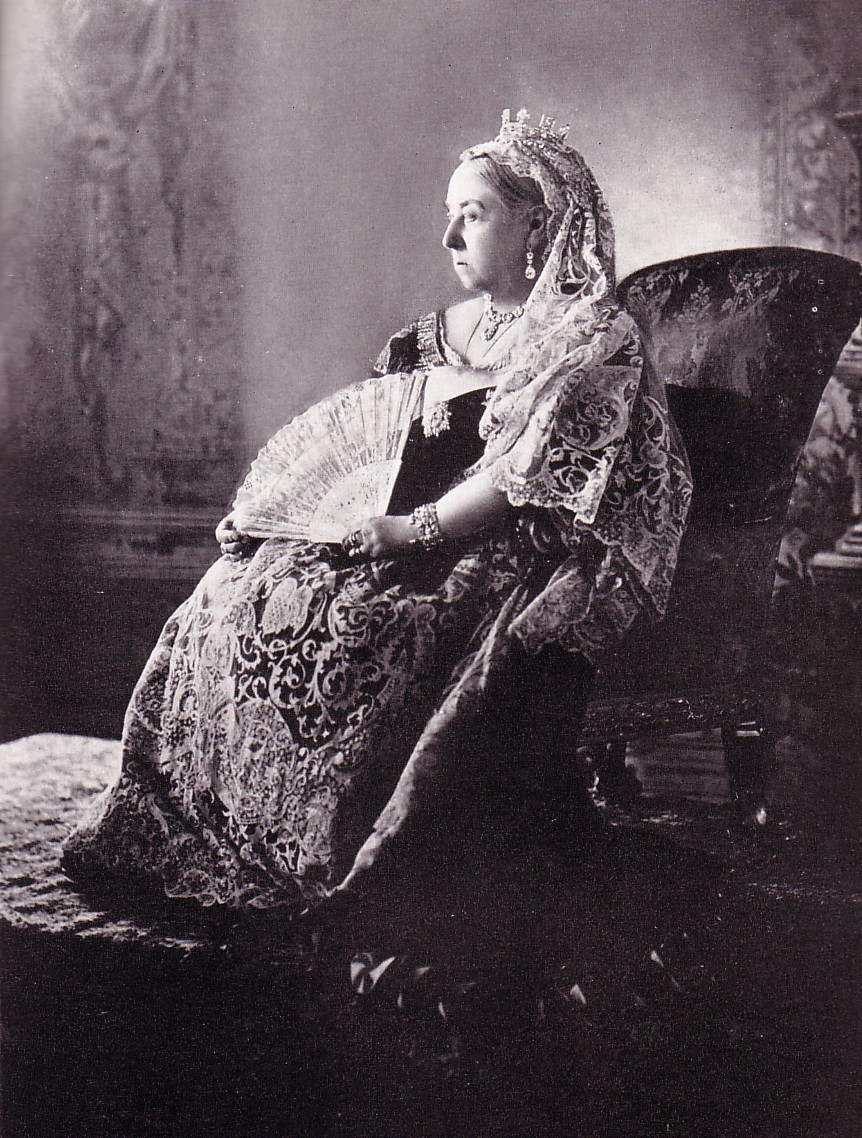
Victoria wearing her wedding veil and lace for her Diamond Jubilee Portrait, 1897

No images of Victoria and Albert's actual wedding exist. While photography existed in 1840, the results were still too primitive to be considered as a means of preserving what the wedding looked like. No historically accurate portrait was painted of the wedding, although many official portraits of embellished and fictionalised images of the ceremony were made at the time and later.

For example, Sir George Hayter was commissioned to paint the moment in the marriage ceremony that the couple joined hands (right), having sketched it during the wedding and spending the next two years filling in the background and portraits of 56 individuals. The Royal Collection Trust, which has this 1842 painting, describes Hayter's approach to the chapel: "Hayter decided to alter dramatically the setting of the ceremony from what it actually looked like. The tall Gothic canopy and the panelling below are invented and only the details of the huge door behind the bridal pair may have been suggested by the much smaller door at the entrance to the Chapel Royal." In life, the walls of the Chapel Royal, St. James's Palace are grey stone rather than wood and thus not accurately rendered in this painting.

Hayter's depiction, however, may show what the wedding dress actually looked like, suggesting that her large lace flounce was worn over her plain satin skirt. Victoria "sat for him in March [a month after the ceremony] in her 'Bridal dress, veil, wreath & all.'" The jewellery does not match the descriptions of her jewellery at the time: the sapphire brooch is not visible and the queen appears to be wearing a gold belt and ornament at her waist. Images from Hayter's painting were copied and widely reproduced.

In 1847, Victoria commissioned Franz Xaver Winterhalter to paint a portrait of her (above left) wearing her wedding clothes as an anniversary present for Prince Albert. The portrait was also copied as an enamel miniature by John Haslem.

A series of photographs taken by Roger Fenton on 11 May 1854 of Victoria and Albert are erroneously described as wedding or reenactment photographs, with the dress identified as her wedding dress. According to the Royal Collection Trust, the images are the first photographs to show Victoria as a queen, rather than as a wife or mother, and show her and Albert wearing court dress.

== See also ==
- List of individual dresses
