= Page boy (wedding attendant) =

Young male attendant at a wedding or a cotillion

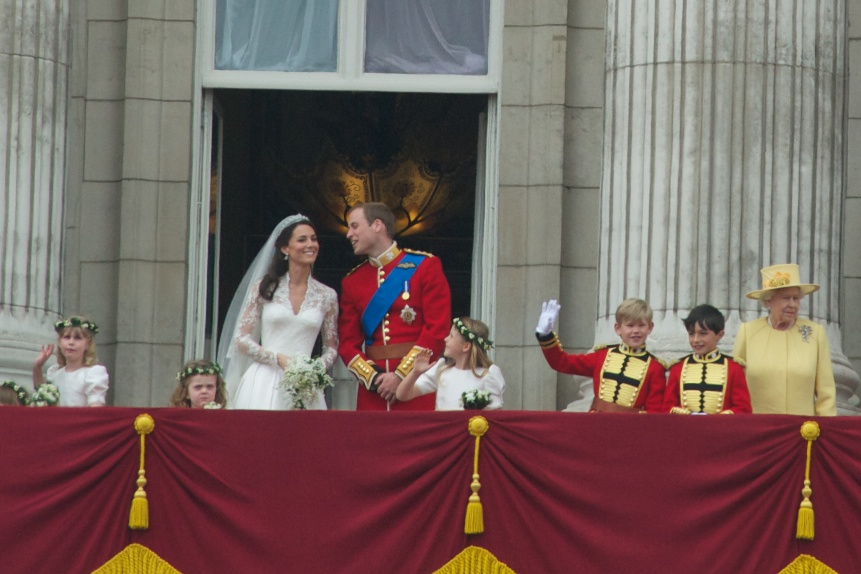
Two page boys can be seen (at right) after the wedding of Prince William and Catherine Middleton.

A page boy is a young male attendant at a wedding or a cotillion (a social dance). They are, in effect, the young male equivalents of bridesmaids, taking part in the bridal party and assisting with tasks during the ceremony. Traditionally, page boys carry the bride's train, especially if she is wearing a dress with a long train. Because of the difficulty of managing a train, page boys are generally no younger than seven, with older boys preferred for more complicated duties.

Page boys often include young relatives or friends' children in the wedding party. In a formal wedding, the ring bearer is a page boy who carries the wedding rings, often symbolically on a wedding ring cushion. The real rings are typically kept by the best man for safekeeping. If the real rings are used, they are usually tacked on with thread to prevent loss.

Pages are often seen at British royal weddings, such as the wedding of Prince William and Catherine Middleton in 2011.

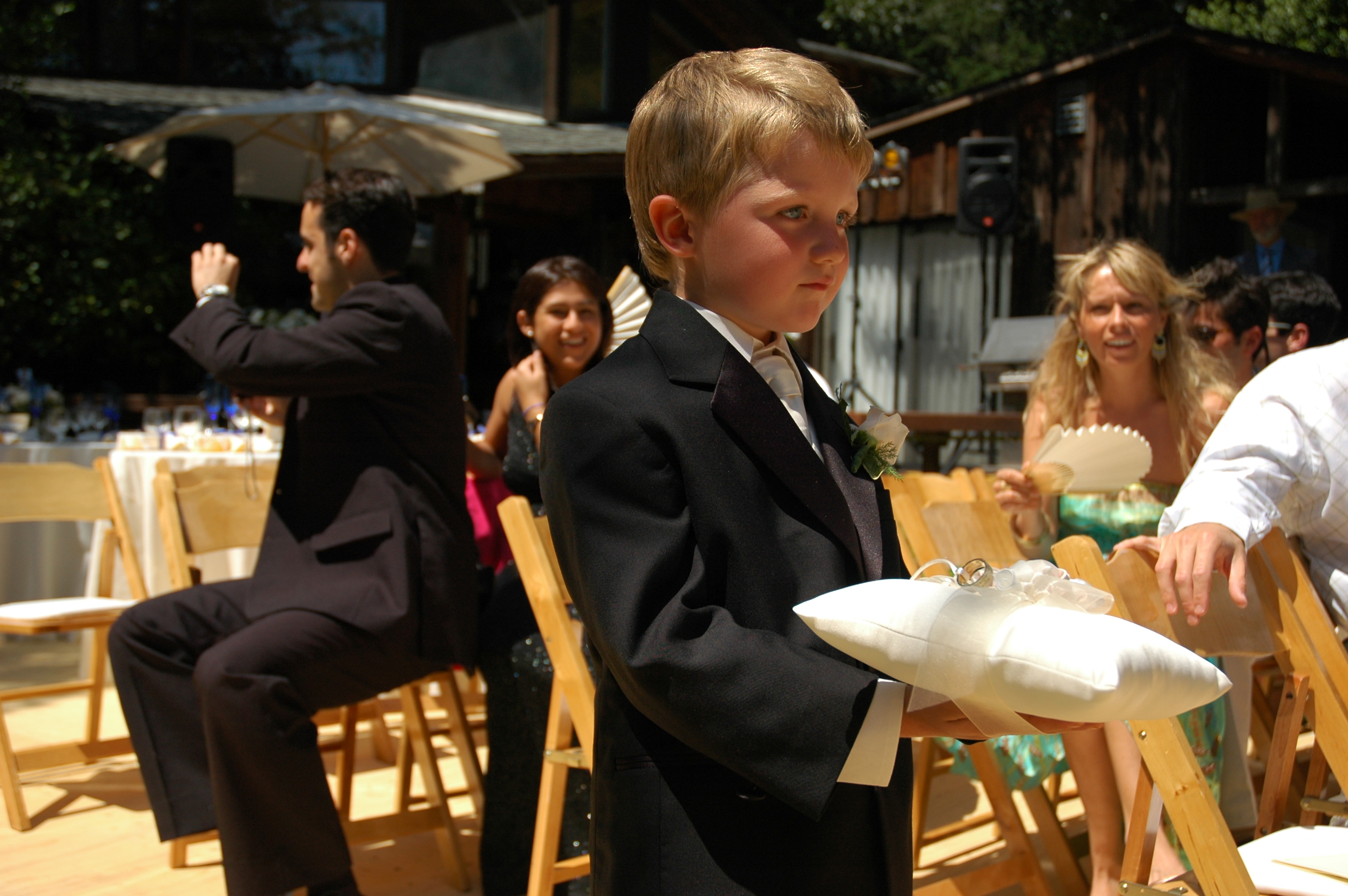
A ring bearer holding a wedding ring on a cushion
