= Registry =

Registry may refer to:

== Computing ==
- Container registry, an operating system-level virtualization registry
- Domain name registry, a database of top-level internet domain names
- Local Internet registry
- Metadata registry, information system for registering metadata
- National Internet registry
- Regional Internet registry, a database of allocated Internet number resources in a particular region of the world
- Windows Registry, a database of configuration settings in Microsoft Windows operating systems
- Service List Registry, an audiovisual service discovery platform

== Gifts ==
- Gift registry, a particular type of wish list, e.g., for anniversaries, birthdays, graduations, honeymoons, housewarmings, showers, weddings
  - Bridal registry, a retailers' plan that allows engaged couples to manage the purchase of wedding gifts
  - Honeymoon registry, a service that assists engaged and married couples in financing their honeymoons

== Government and law ==
- A registry is an authoritative list of one kind of information. Registries normally contain fields with a unique ID, so that the record can be referenced from other documents and registries
  - Civil registry, a government record of vital events (for example, births, deaths and marriages)
  - Land registry, an official record of land ownership
  - Registry of Motor Vehicles, a government agency that administers the registration of automobiles
  - Sex offender registry, a system to allow government authorities to keep track of sex offenders
- Permanent residence registry, a legislative provision that allows an illegal entrant to become a lawful permanent resident by virtue of having continuously resided in the United States since before a specified date
- Registry fee, a postal fee paid to send registered mail
- The Registry, a risk management tool used by landlords to screen prospective renters

== Health and medicine ==
- Cancer registry, a systematic collection of data about cancer and tumor diseases
- NREMT or National Registry of Emergency Medical Technicians, which establishes and verifies entry-level competence for American first responders, emergency medical technicians and paramedics
- Nurse registry, a licensed staffing agency that provides hospitals and individuals with nursing personnel
- American Joint Replacement Registry, an organization that collects and reports hip and knee replacement data to provide actionable information to guide physicians and patient decision making to improve care
- Patient registry, an organised system that uses observational methods to collect uniform data on a population defined by a particular disease, condition, or exposure, and that is followed over time

== Other uses ==
- Breed registry, a record of the ancestry and ownership of purebred animals
- Family registry, a registry used in many countries to track information of genealogical or legal interest
- Survivor registry, a website where people in an area affected by a terrorist attack can post a message saying they are okay
- The Social Registry, a record label

== See also ==
- Register (disambiguation)
- Registrar (disambiguation)
- Social Register (film)
- Social Register
