= Wedding customs by country =

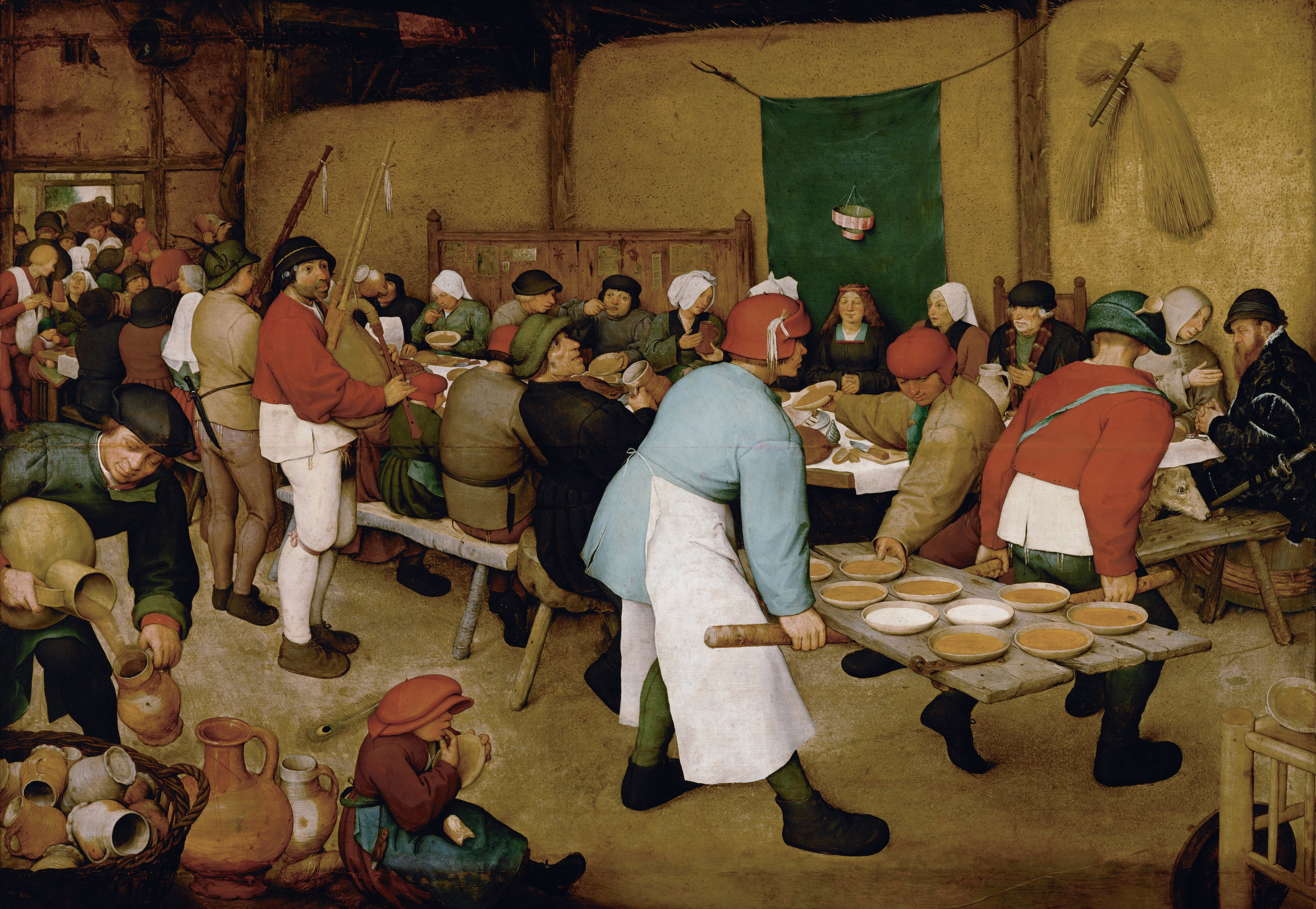
The Peasant Wedding, by Pieter Bruegel, 1567

== Africa ==
=== Ethiopia ===
Marriage in Ethiopia starts with the groom's side sending elders (Shimagle) who then request a union between the parties. The elders discuss a dowry (ጧሎሽ) and verify that the intended bride and groom are not relatives by checking their lineage a minimum of seven generations. After a dowry is agreed upon and it has been determined that there is no relationship between the intended bride and groom, the wedding is announced and the families begin preparations for a church/mosque ceremony and a mels(i) ceremony. On the wedding day the groom and groomsmen (ሚዜ) get ready at the groom's house early in the morning and proceed to the bride's parents house to begin the wedding ceremonies. At the bride's parents' house, the bride gets ready and is seated awaiting the groom's arrival. As the groom and his wedding party arrive, the bride's family and friends ceremonially block the entrance to the house. The groomsmen have to either serenade or bribe their way into the house so that the groom can take the bride with him. Additionally, the best man holds perfume and sprays it everywhere inside the bride's family house. After this ceremony, the groom retrieves his bride and they along with a procession go to a church/mosque to take their wedding vows.

After the religious ceremony, the wedding procession moves to a park/garden where lunch is served to guests. Afterwards, the wedding party typically takes pictures while guests make their way to the reception. At the reception, depending on the family's ethnic group there are several traditional dances performed. Ethiopian weddings typically serve Ethiopian food and live music and the party typically goes on into the early morning. To close the wedding ceremony, elders are seated at the exit of the venue and the bride and groom along with the wedding party bow and kiss the knees of the elders as they exit the venue. This is typically the conclusion the first day of a typical Ethiopian wedding.

The mels(i) ceremony is dependent on the ethnic heritage of the family, but it is typically smaller than the first ceremony and a time for close friends and family to spend some time with each other and continue to celebrate the newly married couple.

=== Nigeria ===
Generally, there are three types of weddings in Nigeria: traditional weddings, church weddings and court weddings. The civil marriage takes place at a registry, and then the traditional wedding ceremony follows, which is followed by the church wedding ceremony. Many couples choose to do all three, depending on their financial situation. Nigerian weddings are normally characterised by an abundance of colours.

In traditional weddings, customs vary from one part of Nigeria to the other. In north, middlebelt, southwest, south east and south-south, it is called the traditional wedding ceremony. Officials and elders sip wine while they invite the couple in for introductions and negotiations, and presentation of the bride price which consists mainly of gifts of shoes, textiles, jewelry and bags. The Yoruba traditional wedding for example involves cultural displays.

In the other parts of the country it is very much the same. Elders from both families retreat into an inner room to negotiate on the bride price. When concluded, the gifts are then presented to the bride's family. After this, the bride, along with her entourage of girls is presented to the husband, family and guests in the most colourful way. Bridewealth has historically formed part of marriage arrangements in several Nigerian societies, including Yoruba and Igbo communities.

=== Pygmy wedding traditions ===
Pygmy engagements were not long and usually formalized by an exchange of visits between the families concerned. The groom to be would bring a gift of game or maybe a few arrows to his new in-laws, take his bride home to live in his band and with his new parents. His only obligation is to find among his relatives a woman willing to marry a brother or male cousin of his wife. If he feels he can feed more than one wife, he may have additional wives.

=== Zimbabwe ===
Customarily, marriage proceedings often begin with the man proposing to the woman. Upon her acceptance the man then calls for a meeting with his clan elders who largely consist of extended elderly family members. A delegation carrying small gifts is then sent to the woman's home to meet with her clan elders. Deliberations on bride price actually begin on a later date and these are strictly conducted by the older men only. Upon completion of these negotiations, a wedding date is set, with the elders having provided an acceptable percentage of the full dowry. The rest of the dowry is expected later. No request is made for it, but the young man is expected to remember to finish his payment and failure to do so spells dishonor for that family.

The wedding day begins with a convoy from the groom's family that heads to the bride's home to collect her. However, the convoy is not immediately let into the bride's homestead. Rather the bride's gate is locked and song and dance begins as a cover for negotiations. Various goods may be asked of the groom and he willingly obliges to the demands after which he is let into the compound.

== Asia ==
=== Arabic customs ===
Christian weddings in the Arab World bear similarities to Western weddings, whereas Muslim weddings in the Arab countries are influenced by Muslim traditions. Muslim weddings start with a Sheikh and Katb Al-kitaab (book) for the bride and groom. A wedding is not Islamically valid unless both bride and groom are willing, and the groom is often encouraged to visit her before the wedding (as advised in many hadith of the Islamic prophet Muhammad). However, these visits must be chaperoned to ensure purity of action between the two. It is the custom that the groom and his family pay for all the wedding expenses. The bride's family gather together before the wedding in the bride's parents house. The groom's family come and take the bride from the house in a decorated car along with the one bride's mate which usually is the bride's sister, cousin, or best friend. The rest of the family and close friends follow in their cars, honking the car's horns. The reception is usually for all the family and friends, usually with a meal and cake. Candy covered almonds is a traditional giveaway from the couple. There is a lot of dancing and (zaghareet) Ululation. The Muslims tradition is to have men in one side and women in another so the ladies can remove their head covering. However, in non-Muslim traditions the whole wedding is for both sexes.

=== Bangladesh ===
See: Bengali Hindu wedding and Bengali Muslim wedding

Bangladeshi wedding refers to the weddings in Bangladesh. Although Muslim and Hindu marriages have their distinctive religious rituals, there are many common cultural rituals in marriages across religion among Bengali people. The indigenous groups of Bangladesh also have their own unique wedding traditions and rituals which are distinct from those of the Bengalis. Prior to the legal and religious ceremonies, the bride and groom are anointed with turmeric in the gaye holud.

=== Cambodia ===
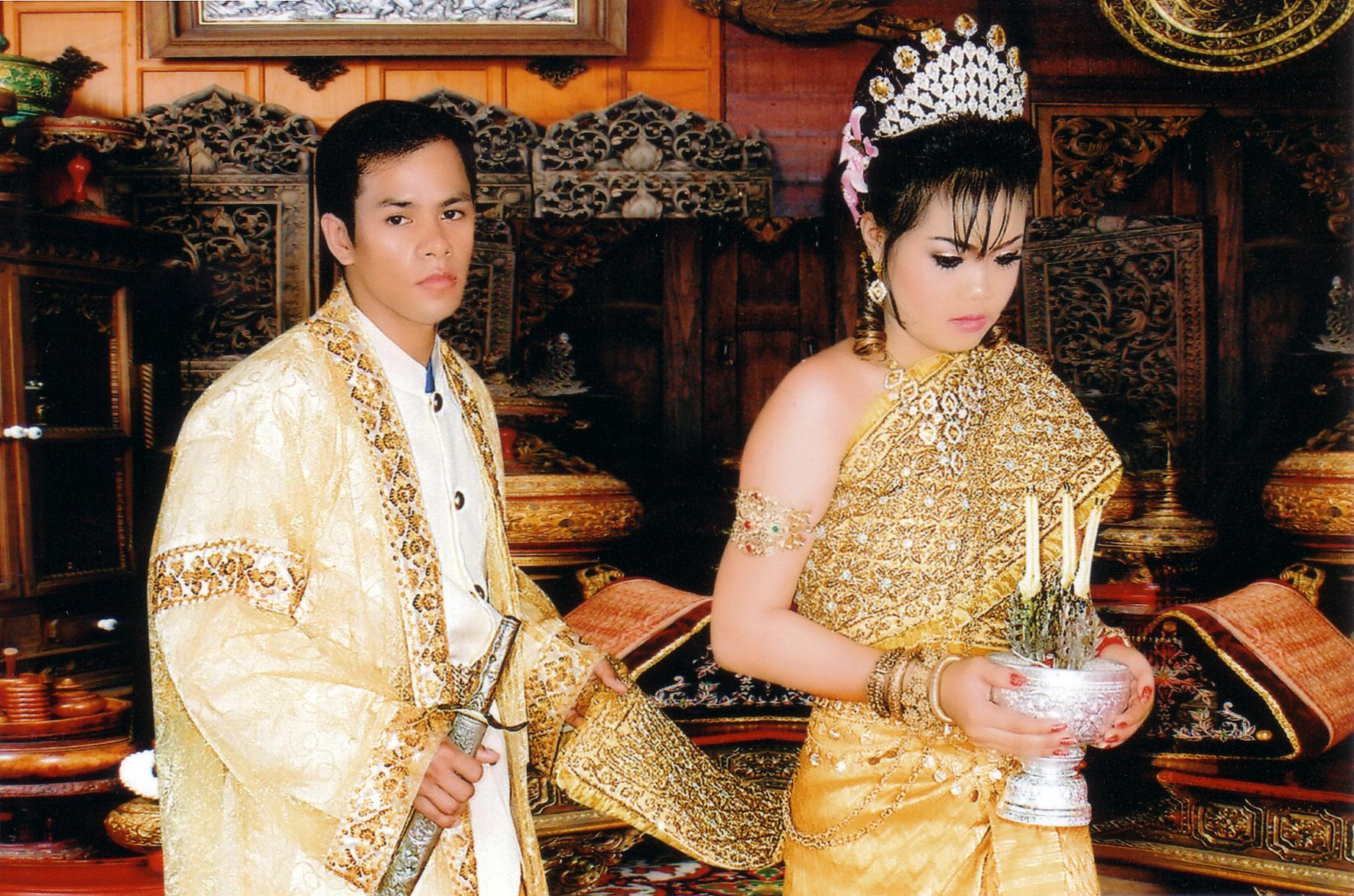
Khmer (Cambodian) traditional wedding

=== China ===
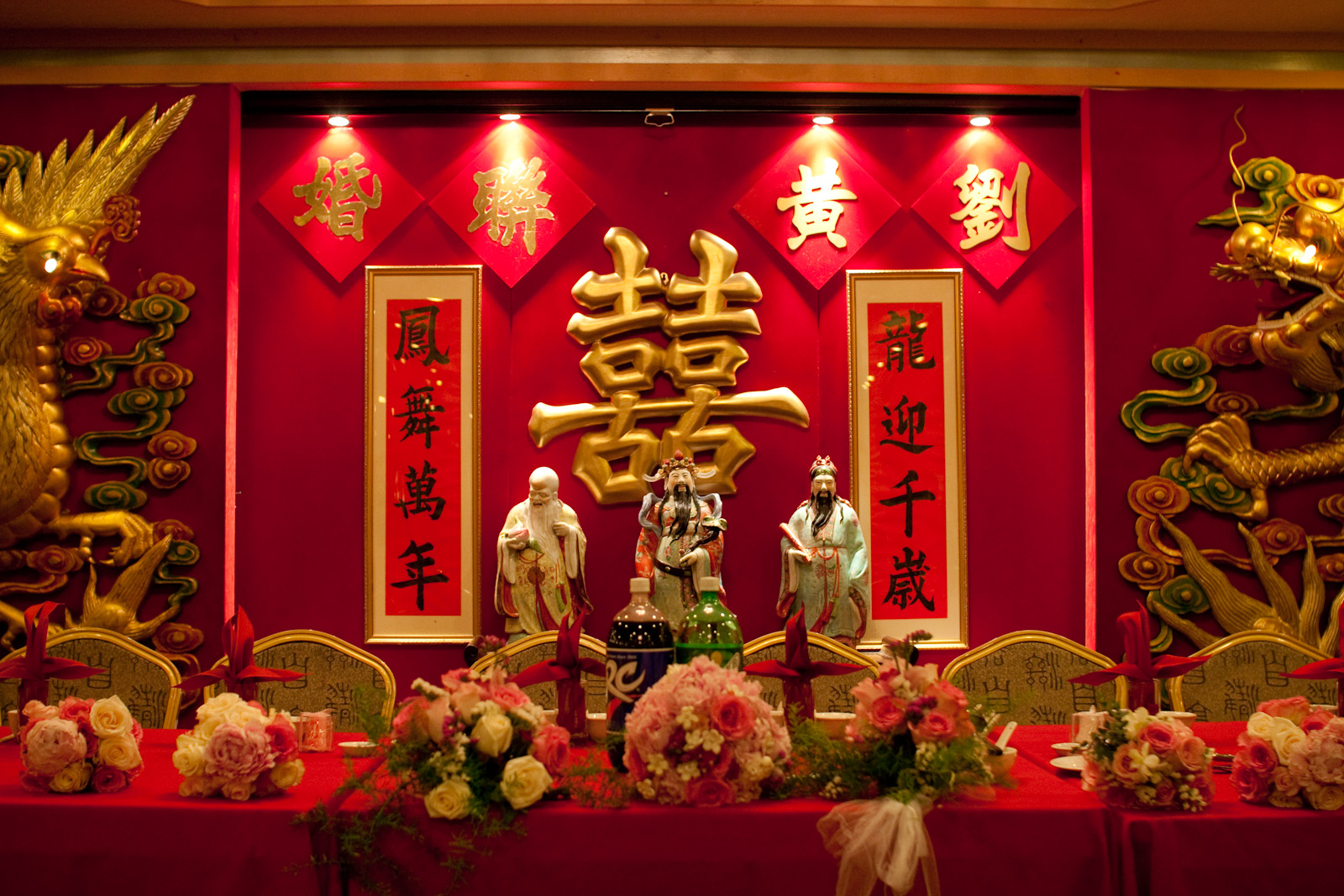
Decorations at a traditional Chinese wedding banquet

Traditional Chinese marriage is a ceremonial ritual within Chinese societies that involve a marriage established by pre-arrangement between families. Within the traditional Chinese culture, romantic love was allowed, and monogamy was the norm for most ordinary citizens. A band of musicians with gongs and double-reed instruments accompanies the bridal parade to the groom's home. Similar music is also played at the wedding banquet. Depending on the region from which the bride hails, Chinese weddings will have different traditions such as the Tea Ceremony or the use of a wedding emcee. Also, in modern times, Chinese couples will often go to photo studios to take "glamour shots," posing in multiple gowns and various backgrounds.

Most regional Chinese wedding rituals follow the main Chinese wedding traditions, although some rituals are particular to the peoples of the southern China region. In most southern Chinese weddings, the bride price is based on the groom's economic status. The idea of "selling the daughter" or bride is not a phrase that is used often. Therefore, the price of the bride does not tend to be too demanding. Most of the time, the bride price is in the form of gold jewelry, fine fabric, money, or even a roast pig, which symbolizes that the bride is a virgin. Wedding presents are given by elderly couples or couples that are older than the newlyweds, while tea is served by the younger family members.

=== Iran ===
Persian wedding tradition, despite its local and regional variations, like many other rituals in Persia goes back to the ancient Zoroastrian tradition. Though the concepts and theory of the marriage have changed drastically by Islamic traditions, the actual ceremonies have remained more or less the same as they were originally in the ancient Zoroastrian culture.

=== India ===
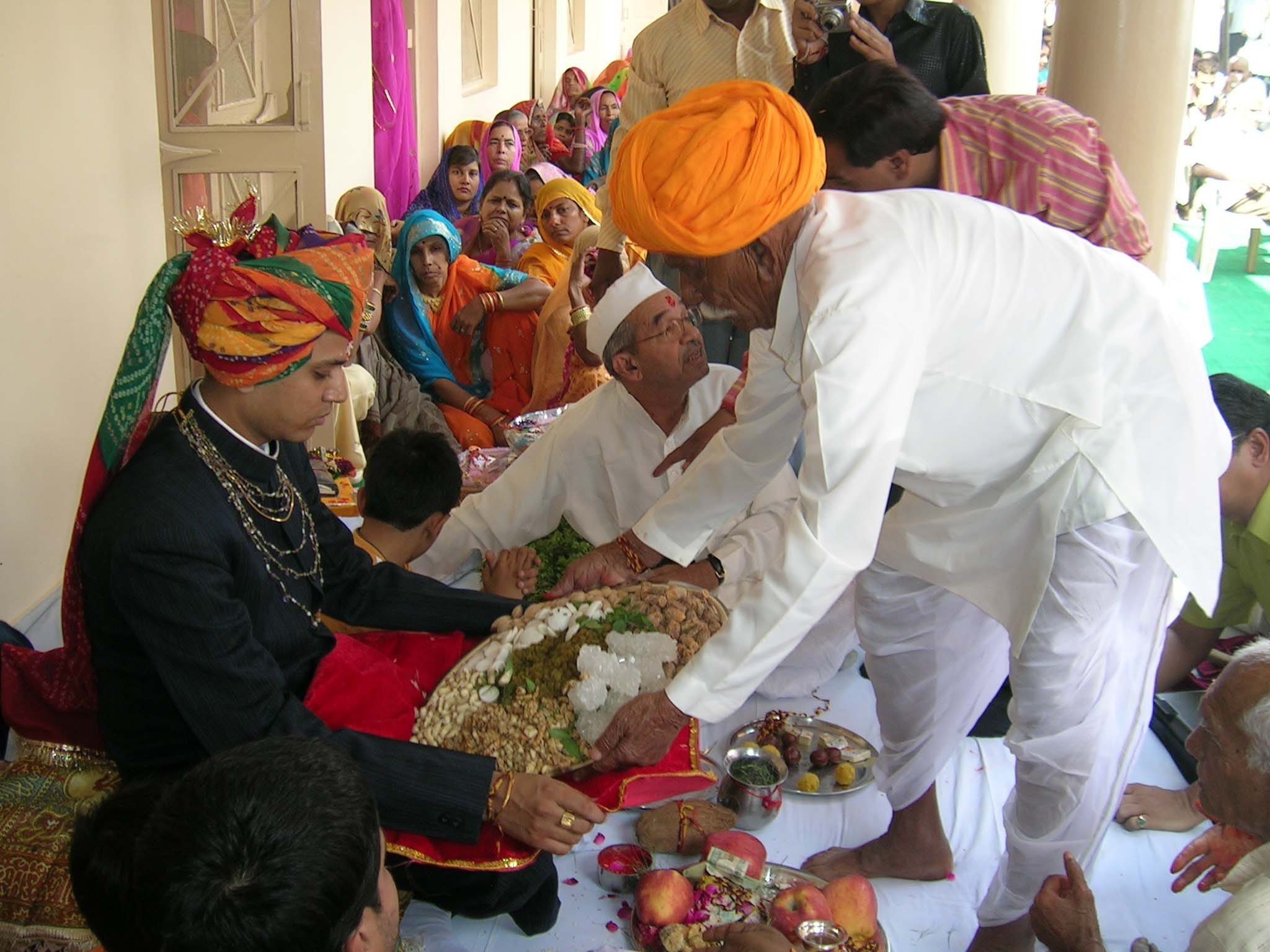
The wedding feast is served at a Hindu Rajput wedding

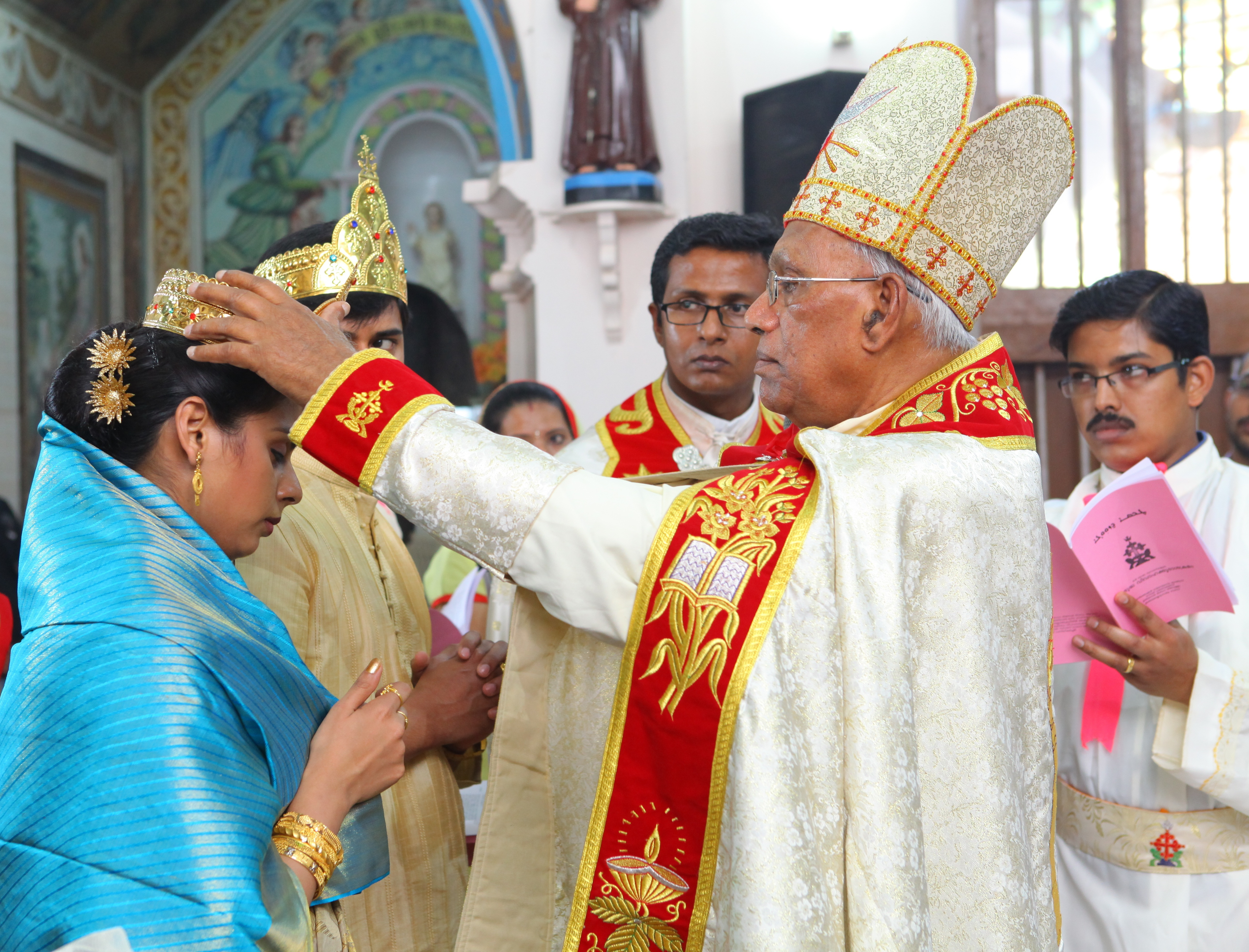
Mystery of Crowning during a Nasrani wedding in the Syro-Malabar Catholic Church

Indian weddings take anywhere from five minutes to several weeks, depending on region, religion, and a variety of other factors. Due to the diversity of Indian culture, the wedding style, ceremony and rituals may vary greatly amongst various states, regions, religions and castes. In certain regions, it is quite common that during the traditional wedding days, there would be a tilak ceremony (where the groom is anointed on his forehead), a ceremony for adorning the bride's hand and feet with henna (called mehendi) accompanied by Ladies' Sangeet (music and dance), and many other pre-wedding ceremonies. Another important ceremony followed in certain areas is the "Haldi" program where the bride and the groom are anointed with turmeric paste. All of the close relatives make sure that they have anointed the couple with turmeric. In certain regions, on the day of the wedding proper, the Bridegroom, his friends and relatives come singing and dancing to the wedding site in a procession called baraat, and then the religious rituals take place to solemnize the wedding, according to the religion of the couple. While the groom may wear traditional Sherwani or dhoti or Western suit, or some other local costume, his face, in certain regions, is usually veiled with a mini-curtain of flowers called sehra. In certain regions, the bride (Hindu or Muslim) always wears red clothes, never white because white symbolizes widowhood in Indian culture. In Southern and Eastern states the bride usually wears a Sari, but in northern and central states the preferred garment is a decorated Red skirt-blouse and veil called lehenga. After the solemnization of marriage, the bride departs with her husband. This is a very sad event for the bride's relatives because traditionally she is supposed to permanently "break-off" her relations with her blood relatives to join her husband's family. Among Christians in the state of Kerala, the bridegroom departs with the bride's family. The wedding may be followed by a "reception" by the groom's parents at the groom's place. While gifts and money to the couple are commonly given, the traditional dowry from the bride's parents to the couple is officially forbidden by law.

=== Indonesia and Malaysia ===
==== Malay wedding customs ====
A Malay wedding ceremony spreads over two days, beginning with the akad nikah ceremony on the first day. The groom signs the marriage contract and agrees to provide the bride with a mas kahwin (dowry). After that, their hands are dyed with henna during the berinai besar ceremony. On the second day, the bride is with her family and friends with musicians and bunga manggar or palm blossom carriers at the bride's house. At the house they are greeted with sprinkling of yellow rice and scented water.

==== Minangkabau wedding customs ====
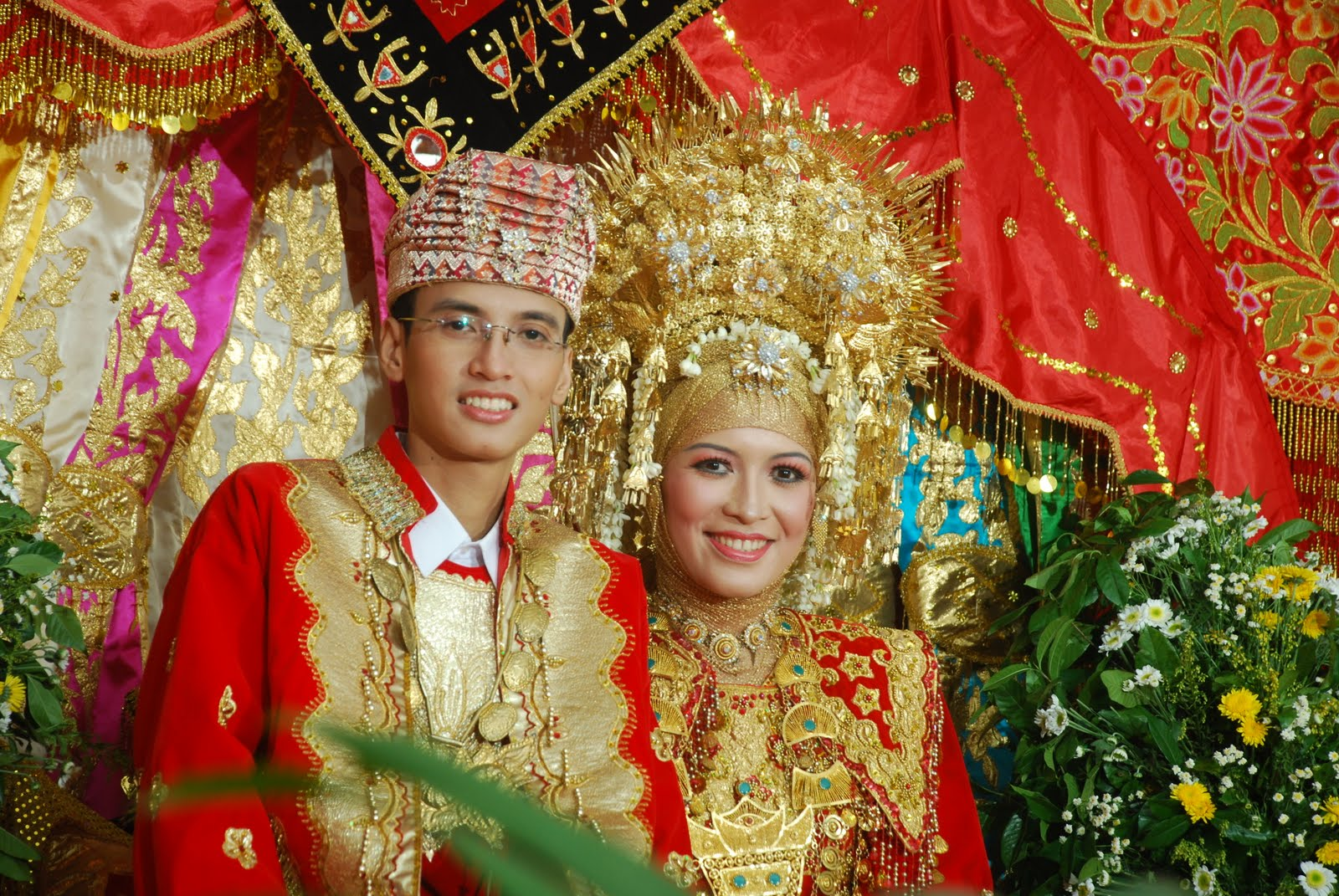
A Minangkabau wedding in West Sumatera, Indonesia

As a matrilineal society, the bride family will be the one who proposes to the groom. This tradition is called maminang. If proposal is accepted, they will sign marriage contract. For the ceremony, manjapuik marapulai, the bride family will invite the groom, then, they will be shown to the public as newly married couple.

==== Iban wedding customs ====
Under traditional Iban adat customs, marriage is solemnised through a public announcement in the presence of a Tuai Rumah (longhouse headman), relatives of the couple and members of the longhouse community. There are three customary procedures for solemnising an Iban marriage: Melah Pinang, Bebiau and Beterang. Melah Pinang involves splitting an areca nut to mark the completion of the marriage formalities and establish a date for the couple to revisit the bride's longhouse. Bebiau is a ceremony in which incantations are recited and a cockerel is waved over the couple to seek spiritual blessings and protection, accompanied by public reminders of their obligations under adat.

In contrast, Beterang is a simpler procedure involving a public announcement of the marriage by a person appointed by the families, with or without the presence of a Tuai Rumah and without spiritual rituals. It was a common form of marriage solemnisation in the past and remains in use today.

Under Iban customs, nguai refers to the custom whereby one spouse leaves their family of origin to establish permanent residence with the other spouse's family. This custom determines membership in a longhouse community, as permanent residence confers membership and its associated rights and privileges. When a couple comes from different longhouses, they must agree on their permanent place of residence, known as penyangkai, which literally means a port or landing place. Couples from the same longhouse must similarly decide which family or household they will reside with permanently.

=== Japan ===
Japanese customs fall into two categories: traditional Shinto ceremonies, and modern Western-style ceremonies. In either case, the couple must first be legally married by filing for marriage at their local government office, and the official documentation must be produced in order for the ceremony to be held.

==== Traditional customs ====
Before ever getting married there are two types of mate selection that may occur with the couple: (1) miai, or an arranged marriage and (2) ren ai, or a love match. The Japanese bride-to-be may be painted pure white from head to toe, visibly declaring her maiden status to the gods. Two choices of headgear exist. One, the watabōshi, is a white hood; the other, called the tsunokakushi, serves to hide the bride's 'horns of jealousy.' It also symbolizes the bride's intention to become a gentle and obedient wife.

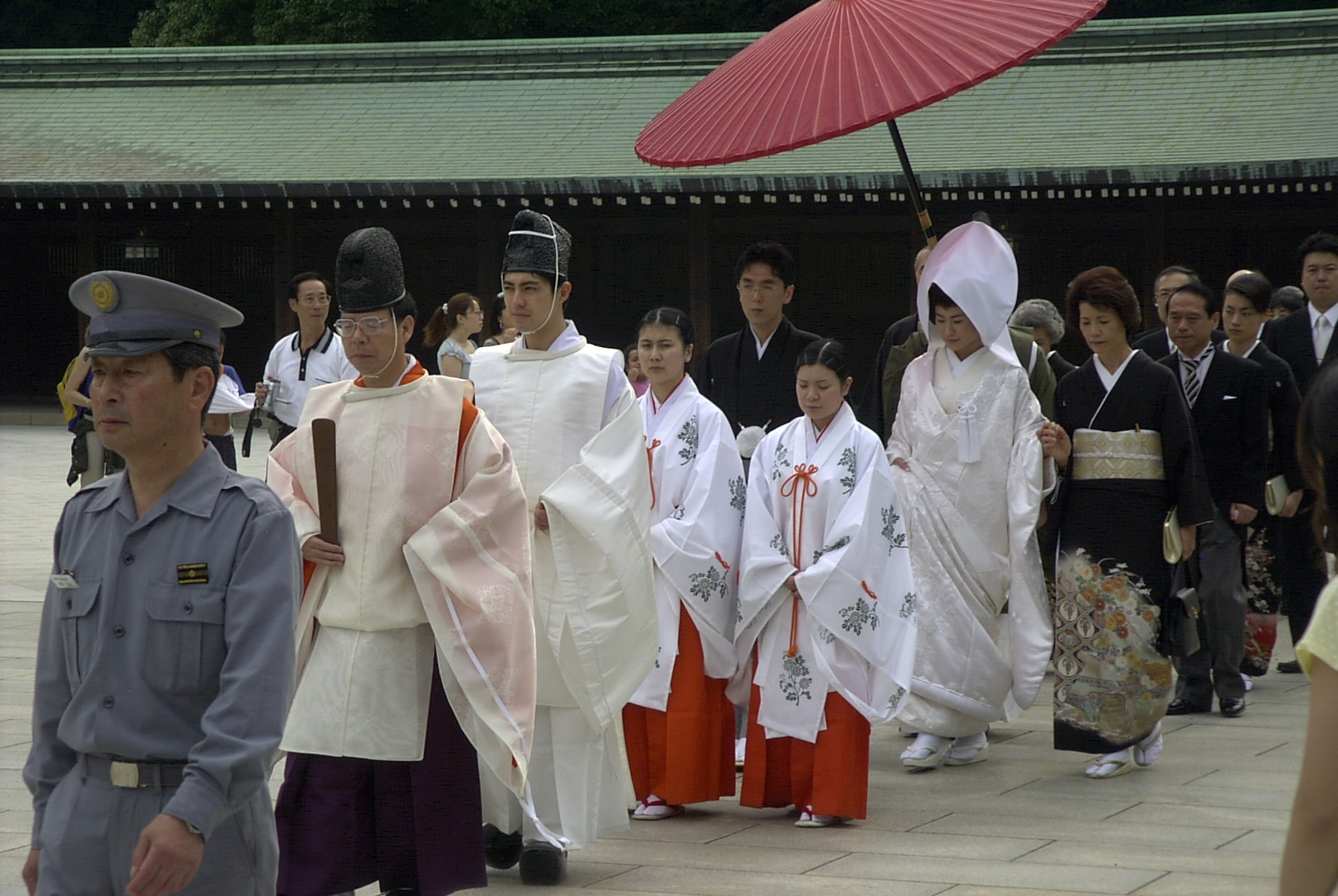
A traditional Japanese wedding ceremony

Traditional Japanese wedding customs (shinzen shiki) involve an elaborate ceremony held at a Shinto shrine. Japanese weddings are being increasingly extravagant with all the elaborate details placed into thought. However, in some cases, younger generations choose to abandon the formal ways by having a "no host party" for a wedding. In this situation, the guests include mainly of the couple's friends who pay an attendance fee.

==== Western-style customs ====
In recent years, the "Western Style Wedding" (influenced by Christian weddings) has become the choice of most couples in Japan. An industry has sprung up, dedicated to providing couples with a ceremony modeled after church rituals. Japanese western style weddings are generally held in a chapel, either in a simple or elaborate ceremony, often at a dedicated wedding chapel within a hotel.

Before the ceremony, there is a rehearsal. Often during this rehearsal, the bride's mother lowers the veil for her daughter, signifying the last act that a mother can do for her daughter, before "giving her away". The father of the bride, much like in Western ceremonies, walks the bride down the aisle to her awaiting groom.

After the rehearsal comes the procession. The wedding celebrant will often wear a wedding cross, or cana, a cross with two interlocking wedding rings attached, which symbolize a couple's commitment to sharing a life together in the bonds of holy matrimony. The wedding celebrant gives a brief welcome and an introductory speech before announcing the bride's entrance. The procession ends with the groom bowing to the bride's father. The father bows in return.

The service then starts. The service is given either in Japanese, English or quite often, a mix of both. It follows Protestant ceremony, relaxed and not overtly religious. Typically part of 1 Corinthians 13 is read from the Bible. After the reading, there is a prayer and a short message, explaining the sanctity of the wedding vows (seiyaku). The bride and groom share their vows and exchange rings. The chapel register is signed and the new couple is announced. This is often followed by the traditional wedding kiss. The service can conclude with another hymn and a benediction.

With the two types of ceremonies, Shinto and Western, available it was bound for the two to be combined into what is called a contemporary Japanese wedding. Contemporary Japanese weddings are celebrated in many ways. On the beginning of the wedding day, the participants are to get ready at the parlor's beauty shop. The responsibility of the beauty shop is to dress the bride, the groom, and the other participants in the formal Japanese attire. Dressing the bride is an important task because the bride is to change into several outfits throughout her wedding day. Due to the complexity of the design, dressing a bride can be difficult and time-consuming and for this reason the bride must be the first person to arrive two hours prior to the wedding ceremony. The bride's attire consists of an extravagant kimono, heavy make-up, a wig, and a head covering. An hour prior to the wedding ceremony, the guests and the groom should start to arrive.

When everyone is dressed in their formal attire, the bride and the groom are to separate from each other and meet their close relatives in a waiting room. The relatives present will appear in the family photo and will also attend the religious ceremony. During this gathering, the kaizoe (assistant) will inform the participants of what will take place and what they should do during the day since they are not familiar with the ceremony.

When all is understood, the relatives and participants are brought to the photo studio where the professional photographs are to be taken. Taking the photographs of the bride, the groom, and their relatives is considered to be the central part of the wedding day. The photographs of the couple and their family are designed to represent the couple's prospective future together.

After the lengthy photo session, the bride, the groom, and others are brought to the Shinto shrine. Nowadays, the Shinto shrine may be conveniently located inside a hotel where all the activities will take place. A Shinto priest conducts the ceremony. In the ceremony, the bride and the groom are purified. However, the ceremony's important event occurs when the bride and the groom exchange nuptial cups of sake also known as san-san-ku-do. With the addition of Western tradition, the exchange of rings and weddings vows also take place. Those guests who did not attend the religious ceremony are able to view the ceremony on video screens located in the lobby.

Like Western-style traditions, a reception takes place right after the wedding ceremony. The guests of the reception include family members, friends, and colleagues. Due to the wedding industry's attempt to maximize time and space, the reception will last exactly two hours. The reception does not include any random activities, but follows a strict order of events. The reception includes dramatic entrances by the bride and the groom with special effects, speeches, and other performances.

Throughout the reception, the bride shall receive the guests' utmost attention because she changes two to three times for the dramatic entrances. With all the dramatic entrances, the groom will join the bride. For example, the first entrance includes the bride, the groom, and the nakodo couple. Nakodo means a "matchmaker" or a "go-between", which is usually referred to the husband. The nakodo couple plays such an important role that their names appear on the announcement of the wedding. The purpose of the nakodo is to symbolize a stable marriage. As the two couples appear a special effect of a cloud of white smoke will appear to surround them. Simultaneously, the hall lights are dimmed and the stage lighting will turn to the color of rose-pink; this astonishes the guests. Pictures are to be taken during the dramatic entrances of the bride and the groom. After the photographs have been taken, they will be led back to their table.

At this point the Master of Ceremonies will congratulate the newlyweds and their family. He/she will then introduce the nakodo, who will start the opening speeches and more speeches will follow. Being that the reception is highly structured the speakers will have the idea of being formal and concise in mind. With all the speeches finished, the bride and the groom will perform the Western-style traditions, which include the following: (1) the cake cutting ceremony and (2) the newlyweds' first dance as husband and wife.

The next part of the reception is the toast, or kanpai, which simplifies the mood of the reception where the guests can start to relax, eat, and drink. What follows the toast are the short congratulatory speeches made by relatives, friends, and colleagues. During this time, the bride has gone to change into her first costume and continues throughout the reception. However, the groom will also have a chance to change into his costume, which is the Western tuxedo. By the end of the night, both the bride and the groom have changed from their traditional Japanese attire to their Western-style attire.

After their last change of costumes, the newlyweds will perform the candle service. Both will have a long, unlit candle, which will be lit from the table where their parents are seated. Next, the couple will walk around the room in a circle and light the candles placed on their guests' table. Once all the candles are lit, the newlyweds will return to their table where they will light what is called the Memorial Candle.

By the time the candle service is done the two hours restriction will soon expire. The remaining few minutes includes short speeches, songs, dances, etc. As the reception ends a flower presentation ceremony will take place, which is where the newlyweds will present their parents with a gift of flowers to display appreciation for their parents raising them to the people they are today. At this point, the reception has ended with quick flashes and farewells.

=== Pakistan ===
A Pakistani wedding typically consist of four ceremonies on four separate days. It may consist of three days if the first function called "Mehndi" is done in a combined manner by both the bride and groom's family.

The first function is Mehndi in which the families get together and celebrate the upcoming wedding function. On this day, it is customary to wear either green, yellow, orange, or other vibrant colors. The bride-to-be gets her hands painted with henna, and songs and dances go on throughout the night. The next day is "baraat" which is hosted by the bride's family. This event is usually held in a reception hall, and the groom comes over with his family and friends; a large feast is given. The bride's friends and relatives are also present, and the Baraat event can be considered the 'main' wedding event as it is the largest one out of all the events. Then there is the holy ceremony of "Nikah" which is performed by a religious Pastor or imam, after which bride and groom are declared as husband and wife.The Next day there is a function of "Walima" in which the groom's family is the host and the bride's family come over for a big feast.

On her wedding day, the bride-to-be can wear any color she wants, but vibrant colors and much traditional gold jewelry are typically worn. It is customary for the bride to wear traditional clothes such as a lahnga, shalwar kameez, or sari. These weddings are also typical of the Muslim community in India.

=== Philippines ===
The groom usually wears the barong tagalog during the wedding, along with the male attendants, though nowadays the wealthy opt to don Western attire such as a tuxedo. Weddings held within the same year by two siblings, usually sisters, called Sukob are frowned upon as it is regarded as bad luck. Some hold it that the wedding rings dropping to the ground is a portent of bad luck (this is usually said to the ring bearer to ensure that the child is careful in handling the rings). Money, in the form of paper bills, is sometimes taped or pinned to the groom and bride's dress during their first dance.

=== Singapore ===
Singapore is a highly inter-racial country in Southeast Asia. The main races of people in Singapore include Chinese, Malay, Indian and Eurasians. As a result of that, the types of wedding customs in Singapore vary relatively widely. For the majority of Chinese, weddings in Singapore would have a day event where the groom will pick up the bride with a tea ceremony followed by a church lunch or dinner banquet.

=== Sri Lanka ===
Sri Lankan weddings are typically celebrated as two functions in two days. In the first day, bride's family hosts the event and the poruwa ceremony takes place. Both bride and groom wear the traditional Kandyan dress and most traditional customs happen on the first day. The traditional honeymoon and the second day hosts by the groom's family and treat bride and her family with foods and entertainment. Minor communities in Sri Lanka also celebrate the wedding ceremony in a similar way with slightly different functions and different traditional dresses. Tamil people wears traditional Tamil wedding dresses and they replace poruwa ceremony with traditional Hindu wedding ceremony. Burgher people wears western traditional dresses and they marry in church as in popular western culture. Sri Lankan Moors celebrates the wedding with added Islam customs.

=== Vietnam ===
The traditional gowns were modeled after the áo nhật bình (worn by royalty women and ladies) of Nguyễn Dynasty members of the court. The fashion trend of the Nguyễn Dynasty has remained popular and is still used today by Vietnamese individuals both in and outside of Vietnam, with some couples altering the design slightly to modernize or suit their taste; the silhouette of the traditional gown still remains the same. The wedding gown compared to other traditional Vietnamese clothes is more intricate in terms of design and only reserved for the wedding days.

== Europe ==
=== Albania ===
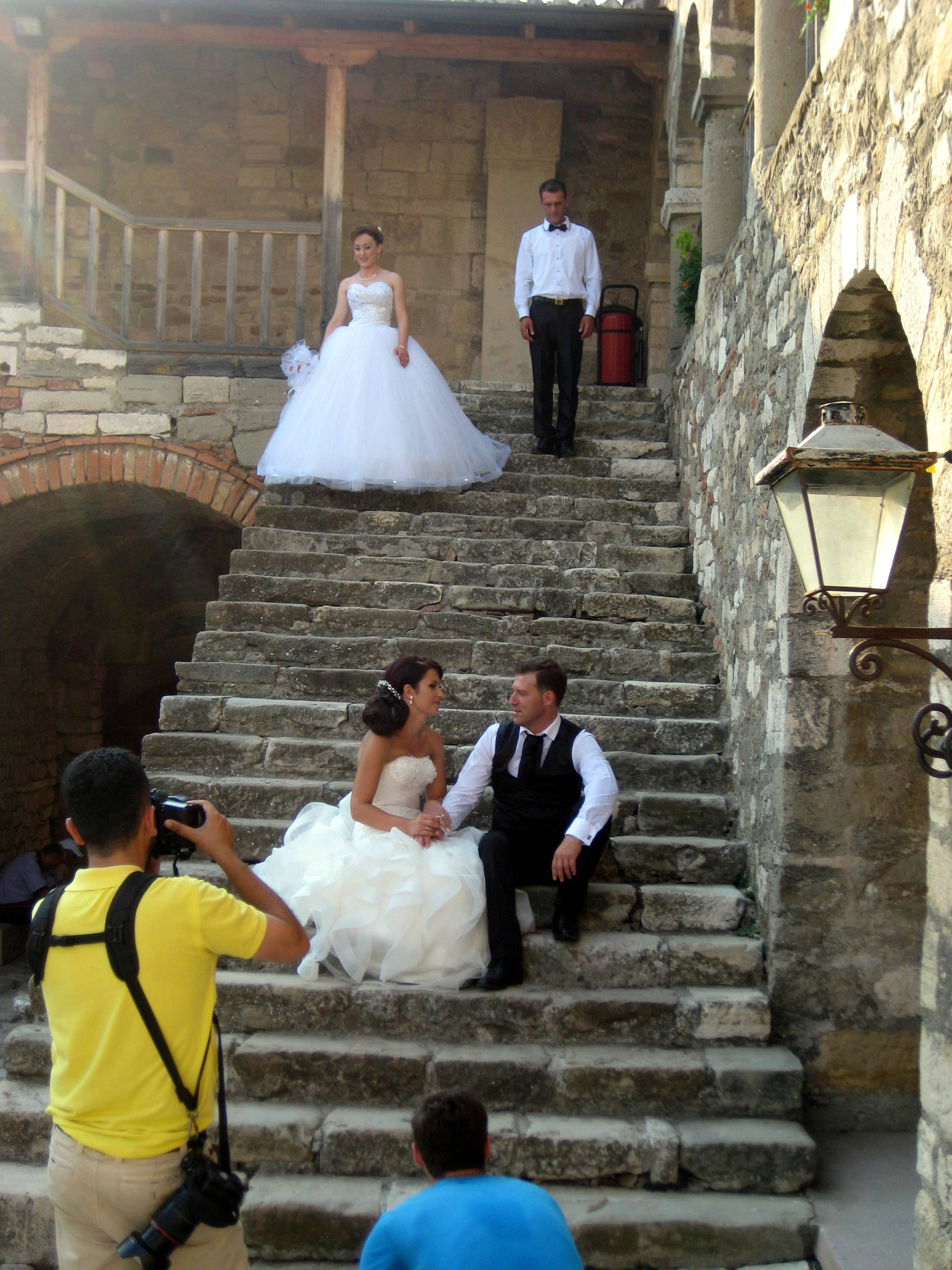
A couple posing in ancient site of Apollonia, Albania

In Albanian traditional weddings, the dress of the bride is characterized by its elegance and transparency, in that of the Catholic one can see full colors. The Catholic bride's dress is characterized by its picturesque effects and harmony.

There are two types of wedding dresses. One is worked on a "shajak" (large piece of wool) and with floral motives worked with "gajtan" (kind of rope) black cotton, sometimes mixed with green. The other one is worked in the same material but with red color. Different from the first here the motifs are enriched with full colors. These dresses have a belt worked with gold and grain necklaces in red, rose, orange creating all together a warm surface. Here the motifs are very small.

This collection of costumes, colors, and cultural expressions has long held significance for Albanians, both for preserving traditions, and for maintaining established craftsmanship and artistic techniques.

The dress of a Catholic bride from Shkodër is tripped from the transparent white, shiny, soft, which spreads all over the body, and is intended to suggest tranquility and a warm purity. This concept of tradition is achieved through the white of the base material and the gold thread over. This dress is composed by the "barnaveke": some kind of very long pants which seem a skirt. In the upper part is worn a shirt and over it a "jelek" (waistcoat).

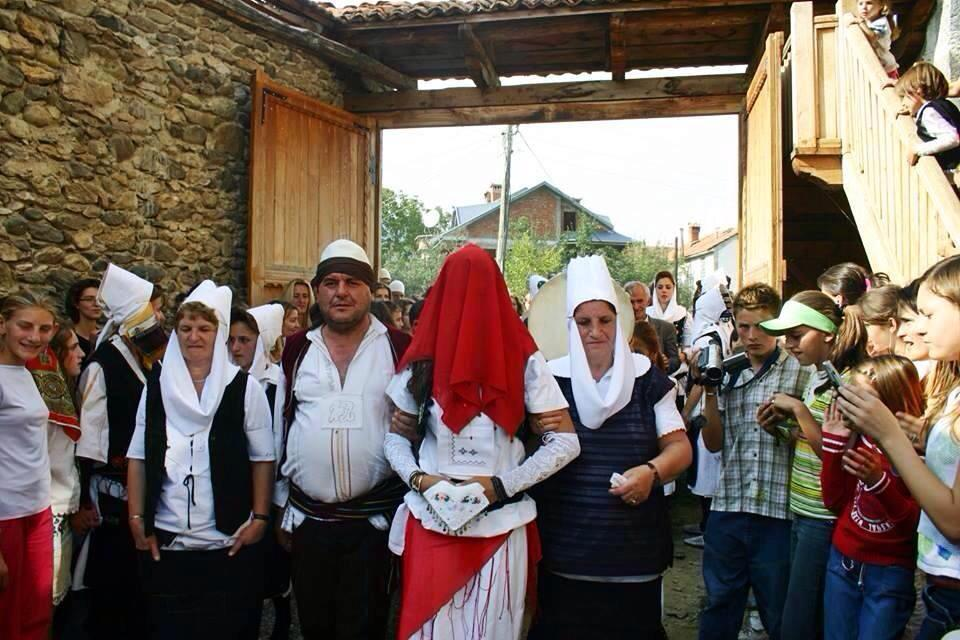
Wedding in Kosovo

Ritual songs name various elements which contain "paja" (pronounced paya) of the girl, which are the goods parents give to the daughter to wear, to furnish the house, gifts for her husband and the intimate cousins. Elements are typically made by weaving clothes using looms. The preparation of the "paja" for the parents of the bride is a pleasure which means also accomplishing the obligations toward the daughter. This is also an expression of the love of parents, but is connected with the economical conditions of the family.

"Dhunti" in Shkodra means the gifts that the groom prepares for the bride during the engagement, mainly clothes, jewelry, gold ornaments and tricks, which are sent to her a few days before the wedding. In addition to those received by the family of his father, the bride takes many gifts from the groom and his family. "Dhuntia", which had a considerable monetary value, was prepared with great care by the family of the boy, because in some way embodied respect and love for his young bride, to whom these gifts were made, love for their son that he married at the same time was also a representation of the family in its economic and aesthetic. In "dhunti" there were enough clothes and items for use at all times, in joy and in sorrow, which expressed particular attention to the role of women.

=== England ===
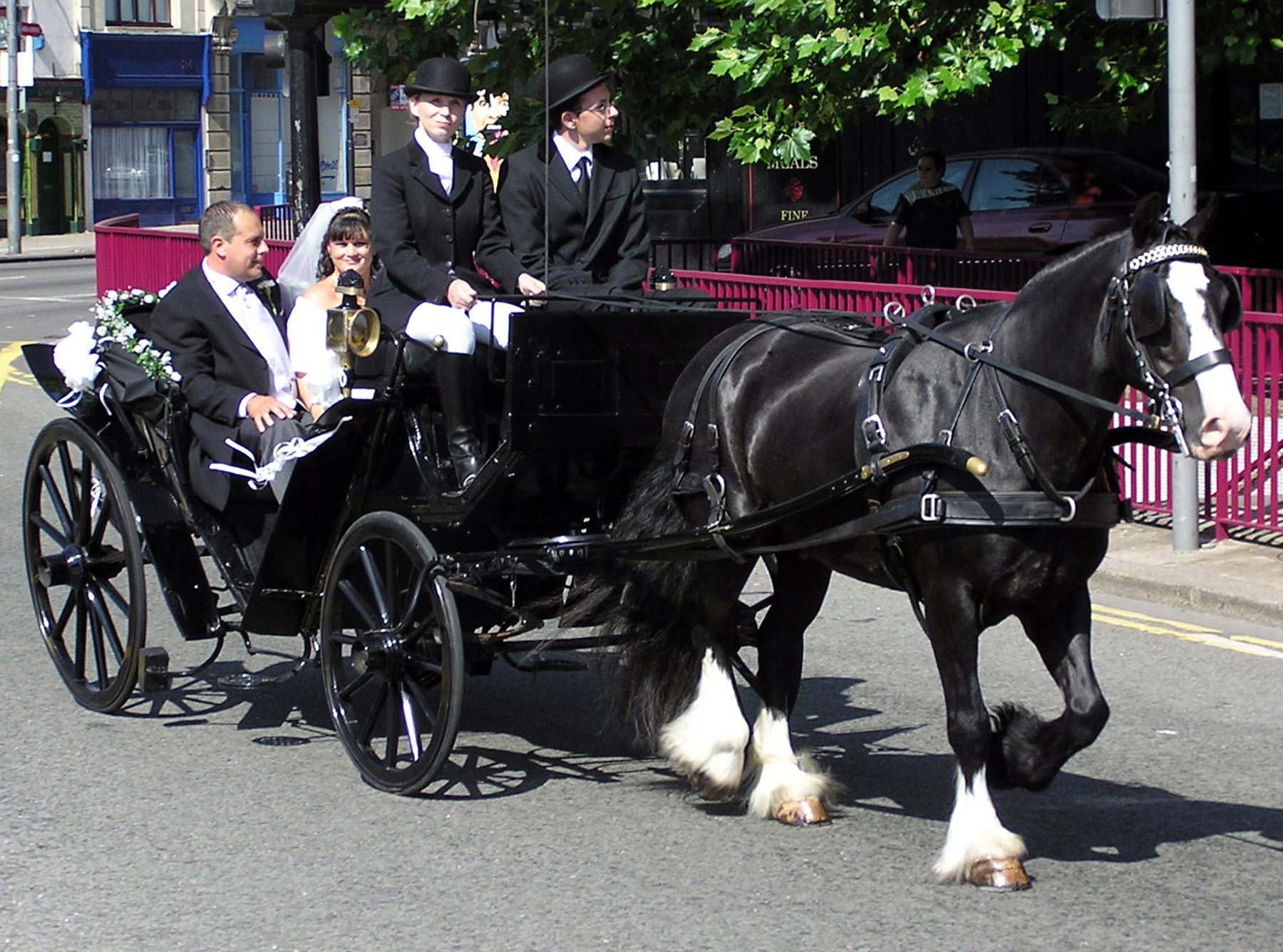
A wedding carriage in Bristol, England

The Western custom of a bride wearing a white wedding dress came to symbolize purity, not virginity, in the Victorian era. Within the "white wedding" tradition, a white dress and veil is not considered appropriate in the second or subsequent wedding of a widow or divorcee.

A wedding is often followed or accompanied by a wedding reception, which in some areas may be known as the 'Wedding Breakfast', at which an elaborate wedding cake is served. Western traditions include toasting the couple, the newlyweds having the first dance, and cutting the cake. A bride may throw her bouquet to the assembled group of all unmarried women in attendance, with folklore suggesting the person who catches it will be the next to wed. A fairly recent equivalent has the groom throwing the bride's garter to the assembled unmarried men; the man who catches it is supposedly the next to wed.

The Wedding Breakfast is one occasion where every member of the family who has had at least some role in the wedding is present. It is also important as the first time the newly married bride and groom share their first meal together as a lawfully wedded couple. The modern Wedding Breakfast includes the service of food to guests that can range from traditional roasts, buffets, or regional treats such as in the case of a London Wedding in the East End.

Another Victorian tradition is for brides to wear or carry "something old, something new, something borrowed, something blue" during the service. It is considered good luck to do so. Often the bride attempts to have one item that meets all of these qualifications, such as a borrowed blue handkerchief which is "new to her" but loaned by her grandmother (thus making it old). Another addition to this custom is to wear a coin in one's shoe to bring prosperity.

The full text of the verse is:

Something old, something new,
Something borrowed, something blue,
And silver sixpence in your shoe.

=== Finland ===
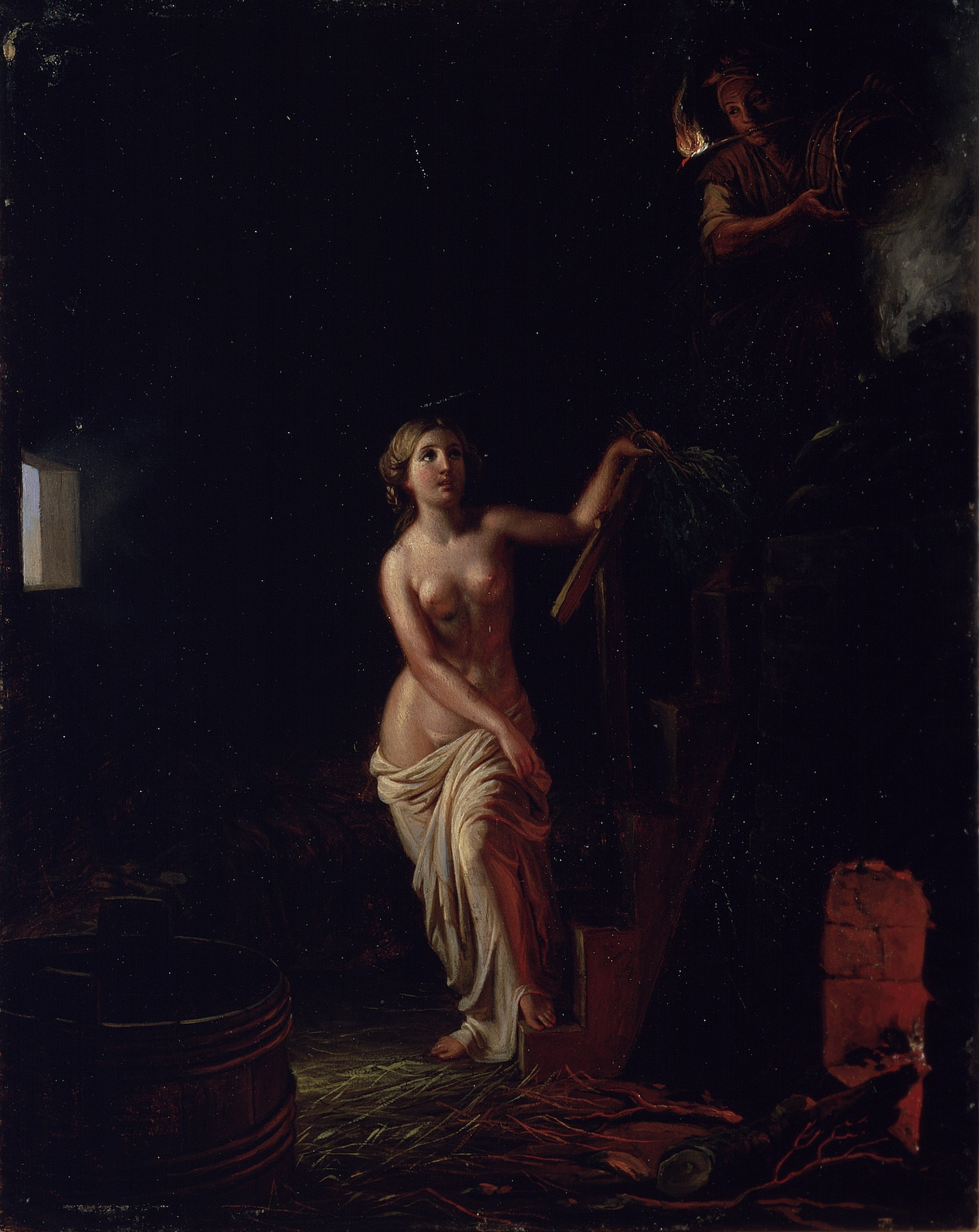
Bridal Sauna by Robert Wilhelm Ekman

One Finnish wedding tradition was the bridal sauna, where the bridesmaids took the bride to a luxuriously decorated, cleansing sauna on the night before the wedding. Instead of the flower bouquet the bath broom was thrown instead.

The wedding dress was traditionally black, passed on as heritage by the bride's mother. It was decorated and the bride was also given a wedding crown made from shiny bits and pieces. Although nobles might have followed differing international conventions, black as the color of choice remained popular amongst the general population even until the 20th century. When Princess Diana wed Prince Charles in 1981 in an all-white gown, it instantly became the standard gown from there on.

The earliest Finnish weddings were held at both the bride's and groom's families' houses, a tradition that survived in Eastern Finland until the late 20th century. In Western Finland there were grand processions to the church, back from the church and from one of the houses to the other. The celebrations at each house lasted a day and then the next day the party moved to the other house. Weddings of wealthy families lasted even longer, from 3 to 4 days. 19th century also saw the rise of gatecrashers called puukkojunkkari at these long weddings.

=== France ===
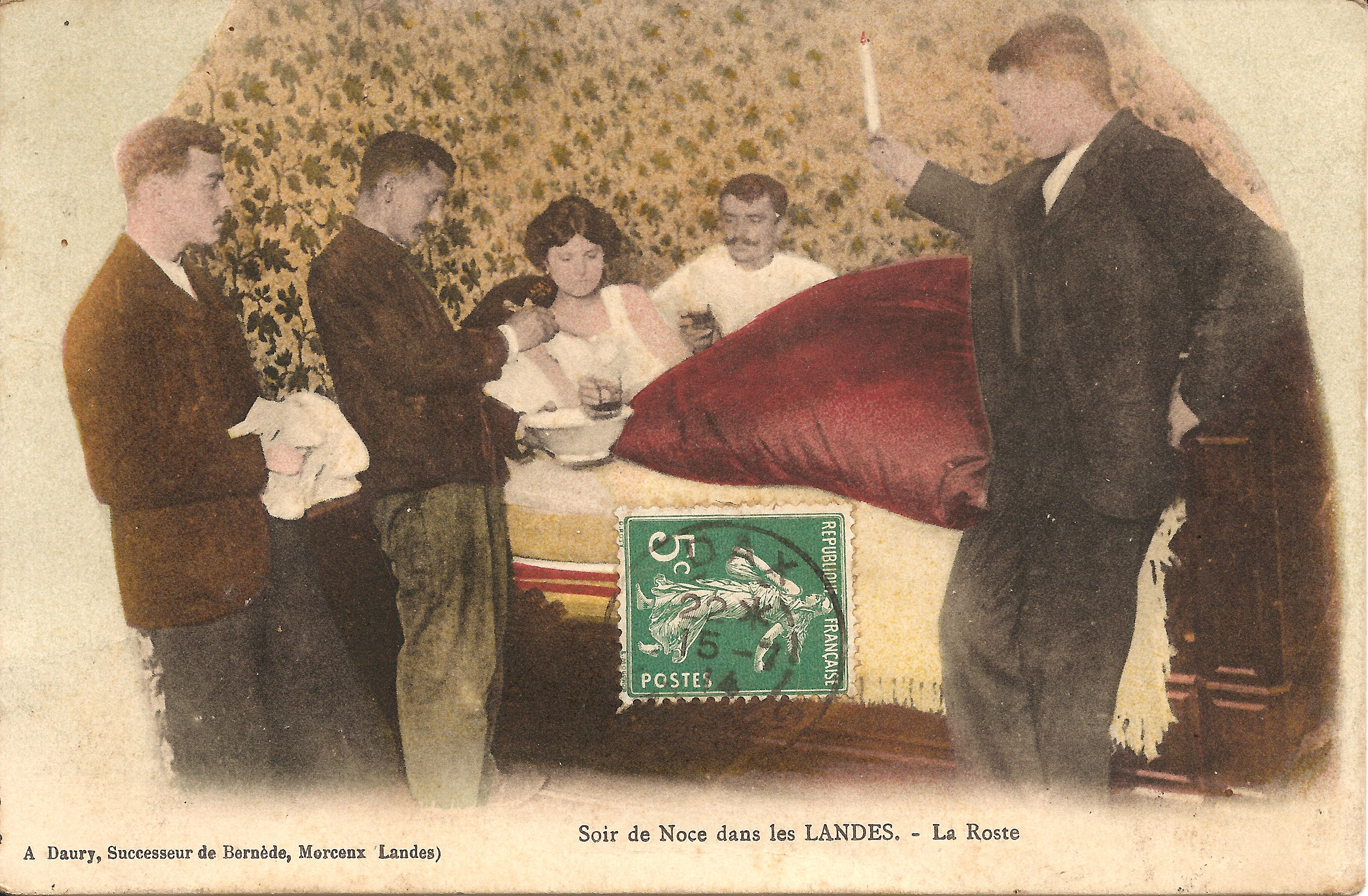
Wedding evening in the Landes: Three people bring la roste (roasted bread soaked in sweet wine) to a couple of newlyweds in bed. Map postally used on July 16, 1914.

In France many couples choose to have two wedding ceremonies: civil and religious. However, only civil weddings are legally recognized (due to the concept of laïcité). These are performed in the town hall by the mayor (or a deputy mayor or another councillor acting on their behalf). To be allowed to marry in a specific town, either at least one of the spouses or at least one of their parents must reside in that town. If there is also a religious wedding ceremony, it must take place after the civil one, often on the same day. Town halls often offer a more elaborate ceremony for couples who do not wish to marry religiously.

If the two ceremonies take place separately, the civil one will usually include close family and witnesses. Once the civil ceremony is complete, the couple will receive a livret de famille, a booklet in which a copy of the marriage certificate is recorded. This is an official document: if the couple have children, each child's birth certificate will be recorded in the livret de famille too. The civil ceremony in France is free of charge.

Traditionally, the wedding guests gathered at the fiancée's home and went to the church in a procession. The procession was led by the bridegroom and his mother, followed by the bride's mother and bridegroom's father, the witnesses, grandparents, brothers and sisters with their spouses. Finally came the bride and her father, followed by the bridesmaids (usually family children).

Nowadays, the guests usually gather at the town hall or church, and the bride and bridegroom enter together, followed by the family and guests.

In some regions, the groom may meet his fiancée at her home on the day of the wedding and escort her to the chapel where the ceremony is being held. As the couple proceeds to the chapel, children will stretch long white ribbons across the road which the bride will cut as she passes.

At the chapel, the bride and groom are seated on two red velvet chairs underneath a silk canopy called a carre. Laurel leaves may be scattered across their paths when they exit the chapel. Sometimes small coins are also tossed for the children to gather.

A traditional French wedding celebration at Château de Hattonchâtel

At the reception, the couple customarily uses a toasting cup called a Coupe de Mariage. This toast originated in France: traditionally a small piece of toast was literally dropped into the couple's wine to ensure a healthy life. The couple would lift their glass to "a toast", as is common in Western culture today.

In south west France it is customary to serve spit roast wild boar (sanglier in French) as the wedding breakfast, a local delicacy.

Some couples choose to serve a croquembouche instead of a wedding cake. This dessert is a pyramid of crème-filled pastry puffs, drizzled with a caramel glaze.

At more boisterous weddings, it is traditional to continue the celebration late into the night. In many regions of France, wedding rituals continue late into the night after the official ceremonies and party. In some regions after the reception, those invited to the wedding will gather outside the newlyweds' window and bang pots and pans; this is called a "charivari". They are then invited into the house for some more drinks in the couple's honor, after which the couple are finally allowed to be alone for their first night together as husband and wife.

In the rural Auvergne-Rhône-Alpes region, a post-wedding ritual called la rôtie involves a gang of unmarried men and women finding the bride and groom who have escaped from the reception, tipping them out of their bed, and serving them a concoction of champagne and chocolate served in a chamber pot, which will be passed around and drunk by everyone. Afterwards, the whole group will enjoy an onion soup. The heavily scatological and sexual implications and off-putting appearance of this ritual is supposed to symbolize the day-to-day intimacy of married life, deeply connected to the rural nature of the area. La rôtie is a tradition separate from the official ceremonies, in which young people can participate, and create humor by making something that "tastes good but is in bad taste". The commensal (i.e. "dining together") quality of the ritual is a symbol of the bridge between youth and the adulthood that the couple attains in marriage, as well as the community's involvement in the new couple's married life. Similar rituals are widespread across rural France, though perhaps with different foods and containers.

=== Germany and Austria ===
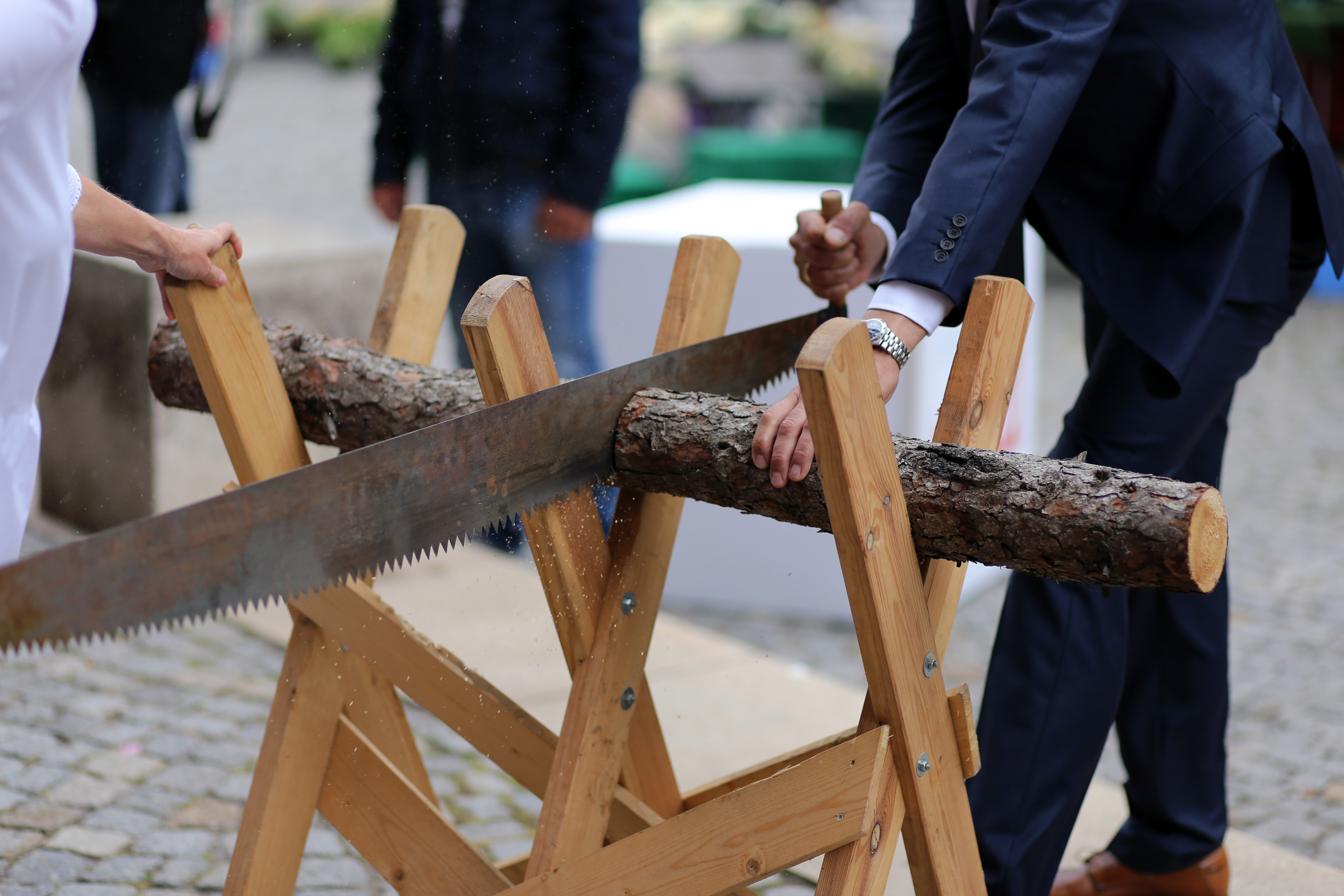
Cutting a log represents the first obstacle that the couple must overcome in their marriage

In a German wedding, friends of the bride "kidnap" her and take her from bar to bar. The best man of the bride, her father, or the groom pays the bill each time. The kidnappers then go to a certain place, such as a public building, and leave a few clues to help others to search for her. The exemption may be associated with a task for the groom, for example an artistic performance or washing the dishes for the next few weeks.

In Austria and Bavaria (usually at country weddings), it is now customary to sing a derisive song before the freeing of the bride.

In Lower Austria it is customary for a masked man and the bride to go to the nearest coffee bar or tavern to drink, sing and wait for the groom to come. In most areas of Austria it is the best man, sometimes the groom or the bride's father (rarely the best man) that pays the price of the kidnappers.

This custom is due to the supposed 'right of the first night' (German Recht der ersten Nacht, French droit de cuissage, ius primae noctis) in the feudal Middle Ages. According to myth, the nobility in the Middle Ages had the right to have sex with their female subordinates on their wedding night. The bride was retrieved (kidnapped) from the vassals of the government from their weddings. The historiography sees this rite as a literary fiction.

In Bavaria and Western Austria another tradition is to wake up the bride early in the morning of the wedding day with a gunshot or firecrackers. Friends and neighbours meet at dawn at the bride's house to "greet" her on her special day.

Baumstamm sägen, the tradition of cutting a log together, represents the first obstacle that the couple must overcome in their marriage. They must work together to overcome the obstacle by sawing through the log. Using a large, long saw with two handles, the couple demonstrate their teamwork to friends and family.

=== Greece ===
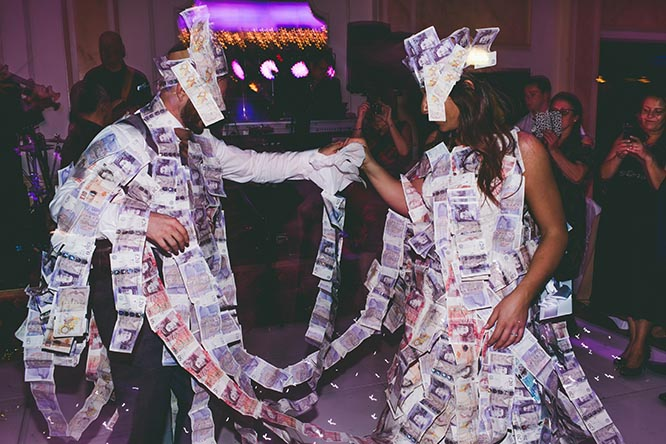
Example of the traditional Greek-Cypriot 'Money Dance' at a Cypriot wedding.

In Greece, two or three days before the wedding, the couple organizes a celebration called Krevati (Greek for bed) in their new home. In Krevati, friends and relatives of the couple put money and young children on the couple's new bed for prosperity and fertility in their life. After the custom, they usually have a party with food and music.

On the day of the wedding, usually Saturday, but also Friday or Sunday, the groom cannot see the bride until the wedding ceremony. The groom usually arrives first in church and waits for the bride, who usually arrives late. After they exchange flower bouquets, they have the wedding ceremony, where the best man puts the wedding rings and crowns on the couple. The couple drink red wine from the same glass (between one and three sips, depending on the tradition). This is not "communion" in the formal religious sense, but about sharing the cup of life. At the end of the wedding ceremony, as the newly wedded pair leave the church, the guests throw rice and flowers for fertility and felicity. Special guests, such as close friends and family receive sugar-coated almonds (traditionally an odd number, usually seven but sometimes five) as a gift from the couple. Most Greek ceremonies are Orthodox.

After the ceremony, usually the couple hold a great wedding party in some place with plenty of food, drinks, music and dance, usually until next morning. The wedding party starts with the invited people waiting for the couple, who usually come after some time. They start the dancing and eventually eat a piece of their wedding cake. At some point during the party, they also dance the traditional zeibekiko (groom) and çiftetelli (bride).

In many places of Greece, where they hold a more traditional wedding, they usually play only traditional music and eat local food. For example, in the region of Cyclades, they eat the traditional pasteli (solid honey with sesame) and in the region of Crete they cook rice with goat. In most traditional weddings, they bake whole animals like pigs, goats or sheep just like the Easter celebration. Before the church ceremony, especially in smaller areas, usually friends and relatives of the bride and the groom, accompanies them separately to the church playing traditional instruments, according to the region.

A typical Greek wedding will usually have more than 100 invited people (but usually 250–500) who are friends, siblings, grandparents, uncles, aunts, first or second cousins, neighbors and colleagues. It is common to have guests whom the couple has never met before. This is because the people who will be invited are usually determined by the parents of the couple and not by the couple themselves. Traditionally, the whole village would have attended the wedding, so very often the parents invite friends of theirs and their children, to the weddings of their own children.

There are many other traditions which are local to their regional areas. One famous tradition is the pinning of money on the bride's dress during a special dance at the wedding reception, a custom especially common in rural areas and villages.

=== Ireland ===
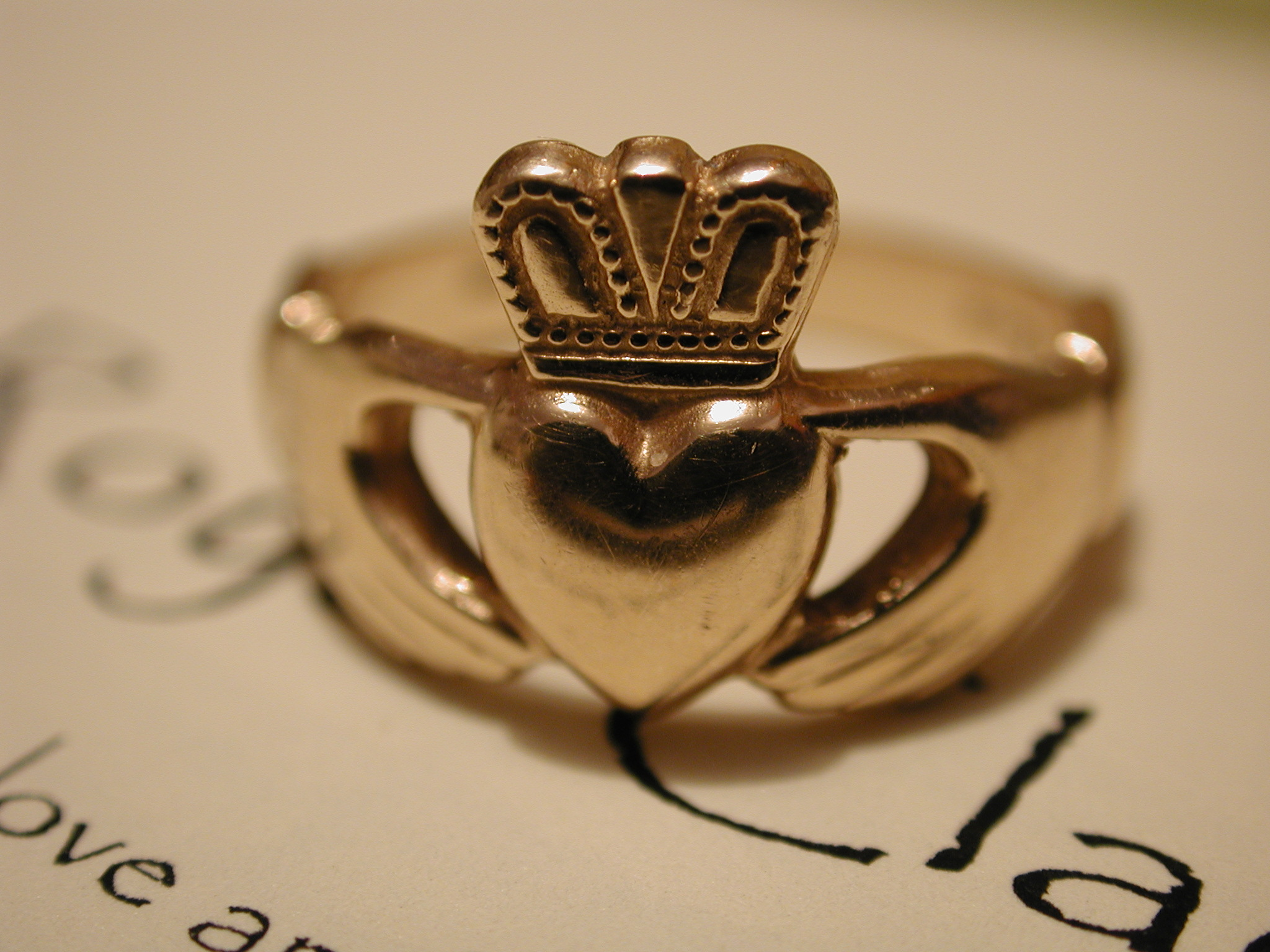
Claddagh ring

Brides in Ireland traditionally wore a blue wedding dress as a symbol of purity. The bride also traditionally kept an embroidered handkerchief on her person all day, which would later be used to make a christening gown for the couple's first child. The wearing of wildflowers in the bride's hair was a common tradition.

A horseshoe was traditionally carried down the aisle by the bride and displayed as a symbol of good luck, with the ends pointing upwards to prevent the luck from running out. The horseshoe would later be hung up in the couple's home as a symbol of protection.

The church door was traditionally locked once the bride and groom were inside, reputedly to prevent the groom changing his mind and running away.

A Claddagh ring is sometimes used as a wedding ring in Ireland.

Handfasting is an occasional ritual at an Irish wedding, whereby the couple's hands are bound together as a symbol of their union.

A statue of the Child of Prague is traditionally left outside from the night before the wedding in the hope that rain will not fall on the wedding day.

=== Italy ===
In some parts of Italy, a party, known as a Serenade, is thrown outside of the bride's home by the groom. His family and friends come and wait for the bride, entertaining themselves until she appears. The groom then sings to his bride to further seduce her. Once his song is sung, the party ends.

Before the wedding, the eldest of the bride's family gifts a silver dollar to the bride. If the bride keeps this silver dollar through the life of their marriage, the couple is said to never need to be concerned for their financial prosperity. If this silver dollar is ever spent, superstition states the couple will immediately encounter financial hardship and can suffer great monetary loss through the length of their marriage.

The day of the wedding, the groomsmen try their hardest to make the groom as uncomfortable as possible by saying things like "Maybe she forgot where the church is".

It is also traditional for the groom's family to give a dowry to the bride and to provide the engagement ring. The bride's family is then responsible for receiving the guests of the wedding in their home for a reception afterward.

The color green is very important in the Italian wedding. In Italy, the tradition of something blue is replaced with something green. This color brings good luck to the married couple. The veil and bridesmaids also were important in an Italian wedding. The tradition began in Ancient Rome when the veil was used to hide the bride from any spirits that would corrupt her and the bridesmaids were to wear similar outfits so that the evil spirits were further confused.

An old Roman custom was that brides threw nuts at rejected suitors as they left the ceremony.

After dessert, more dancing commences, gifts are given, and the guests eventually begin to leave. In Southern Italy, as the guests leave, they hand envelopes of money to the bride and groom, who return the gift with a wedding favor or bomboniere, a small token of appreciation.

=== Poland ===
In Polish weddings, the celebrations may continue for two or three days. In the past, the engagement ceremony was organized by the future groom as a formal family gathering, during which he asked his chosen lady to marry him. In recent years, this custom has changed, and today an engagement is much more personal and intimate. An elegant dinner party afterward is still a nice way to inform the closest family members about the couple's decision to get married.

In some regions of Poland, the tradition to invite wedding guests in person is still upheld. Many young couples, accompanied by their parents, visit their family and friends to hand them the wedding invitations personally.

According to old tradition, a groom arrives with his parents at the house of his bride just before the wedding ceremony. At that time, both parents and parents-in-law give the young couple their blessing. The couple enters the church together and walks up to the altar followed by their parents and two witnesses. In Poland, it is quite unusual for the bride to be walked down the aisle or to have bridesmaids and groomsmen in a wedding. The couple is assisted by two witnesses, a man (usually from the groom's side) and a woman (usually from the bride's side) who are either family members or close friends.

The Polish bride traditionally wears a white dress and a veil; the groom usually wears a fitted suit with a bow tie and a boutonnière that matches the bride's bouquet. During the ceremony, wedding rings are exchanged and both husband and wife wear them on their right hands. Right after the ceremony, the closest family and all the guests form a line in the front of the church to congratulate the newlyweds and wish them love and happiness. As soon as the married couple leaves the church they get showered with rice for luck or guests drop coins at their feet for them to pick up. This is done to ensure a good and prosperous future for the newlyweds.

Once all guests have showered the couple with kisses, hugs and flowers, everyone heads to the reception. It is a custom in Poland to prepare 'passing gates' on the way to the reception for the newlyweds who, in order to pass, have to give the 'gatekeepers' some vodka. This is a misinterpretation of an earlier tradition, where the 'passing gates' were built if the bride was an orphan and money collected by 'gatekeepers' from the guests was handed over to the bride as her dowry (being an orphan usually implied poverty).

The married couple is welcomed at the reception place by the parents with bread and salt; the bread symbolizes prosperity and the salt stands for the hardship of life. This way, the parents wish that the young couple never goes hungry and learns how to deal with everyday hardships together. During the reception, the newlyweds also break two drinking glasses by either stepping on them or throwing them over the shoulder for good fortune. The wedding party lasts (and the bride and groom remain) until the last guest leaves, usually until morning.

In Poland, movements like Human Liberties Crusade or Wedding of the Weddings promote non-alcoholic wedding celebrations.

=== Romania ===
In Romanian tradition, the wedding is composed of three steps: The formal/legal wedding, the Church wedding and the banquet.

Lăutari are Romanian musicians performing traditional songs. The music of the lăutari establishes the structure of the elaborate Romanian weddings. The lăutari also function as guides through the wedding rituals and moderate any conflicts that may arise during what can be a long, alcohol-fueled party. Over a period of nearly 48 hours, this can be very physically strenuous.

Following custom almost certainly dating back at least to the Middle Ages, most lăutari spend the fees from these wedding ceremonies on extended banquets for their friends and families over the days immediately following the wedding.

The wedding begins at the Town hall where the couple literally gets married in the presence of their closest friends and relatives. After that, they go to the bride's house where the Lăutari come and sing themed songs like "Ia-ți mireasă ziua bună" (Bride's farewell) while the bride, the groom and the couple's parents take part in a symbolic preparation for the wedding (the best man and the best maid put a flower on their chests, arrange the groom's tie and shaves him and put the bride's veil, all in front of a big mirror decorated with pieces of veil and white flowers, mirror that separates the bride from the groom). They then go to the church where the religious ceremony is performed. Afterwards they go to a restaurant where the banquet begins.

The newlyweds meet the guests at the entrance and they serve a glass of champagne while the Lautari sing a song. After all the guests have arrived, the couple breaks the ice and starts dancing a waltz followed by a Hora dance. Later on, the chefs do "Dansul găinii" (the chicken dance: they dress up a roasted chicken and decorate it and they dance with it while the best man negotiate the chicken's price with them).

Another tradition is bride kidnapping. A few friends of the newlywed stake the bride while the groom is not paying attention and take her somewhere else, usually to a club. The groom is then forced to negotiate the bride's price and to redeem it, but not until the "criminals" show evidence of having the bride (a shoe, her necklace, etc.). Usually, the "thieves" ask for beverage. They then take the bride back to the wedding and as a punishment they are forced to dance a waltz with the bride lifted up.

It is normal to wish the bride and groom "Casa de Piatra" (Rock-solid home) and throw rice on them, which symbolises a solid marriage and abundance.

=== Russia ===
A traditional Russian wedding lasts for at least two days and some weddings last as long as a week. Throughout the celebration there is dancing, singing, long toasts, and food and drinks. The best man and maid of honor are called witnesses, "svideteli" in Russian. The ceremony and the ring exchange takes place on the first day of the wedding.

Throughout the years, Russian weddings have adopted many western customs, including bridesmaids and flower girls. During the wedding feast any of the guests can start chanting "Gor'ko" ("bitter") which usually is immediately supported by the rest of the guests. In this case bride and groom should kiss each other and the kiss should last for as long as the chanting continues. It's customary for the bride to eat a spoonful of sour cream on your wedding day.

=== Scotland ===
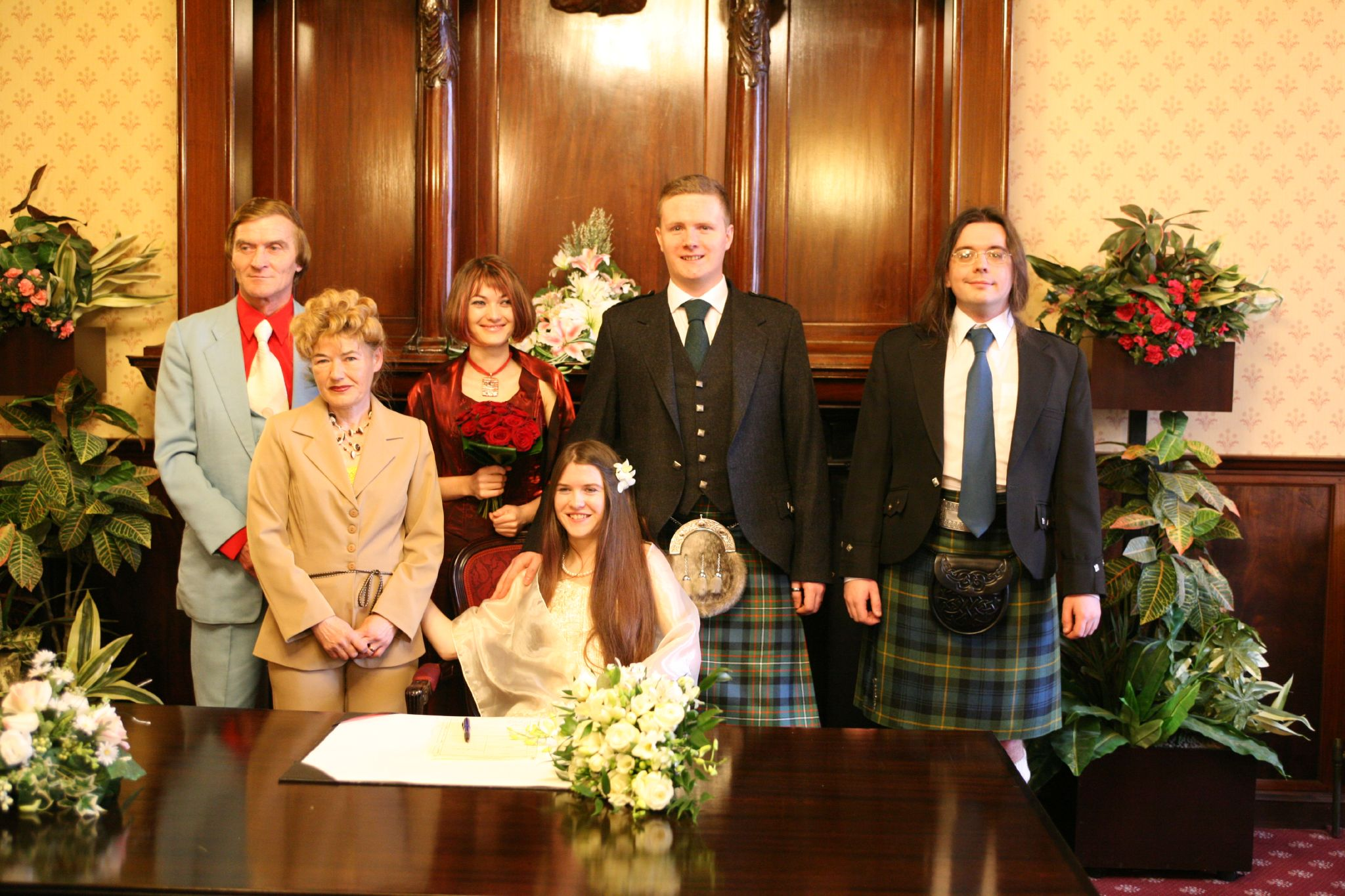
A traditional Scottish wedding

Scotland is a popular place for young English couples to get married since, in Scotland, parents' permission is not required if both the bride and groom are old enough to be legally married (16). In England, it was the case that if either was 16 or 17 then the permission of parents had to be sought. Thus Scotland, and especially the blacksmith's at Gretna Green, became a very popular place for couples to elope to, especially those under 18 and usually living in England. In the year 2000, Gretna Green still hosted 17% of all weddings in Scotland.

For a Scottish wedding, the bride's family sends invitations on behalf of the couple to the wedding guests, addressed by hand. The couple may send the invitations themselves, especially if they are more middle-aged. The invitations are usually sent no later than 6 weeks before the wedding and will specify if the invitation is for ceremony and/or reception and/or evening following the meal at the reception. It has become more common in recent times for Save The Date Cards to be used to notify invitees further in advance to allow sufficient notice for arrangements to be made to ensure attendance. These can be sent up to 6 months before the wedding day.

Guests send or deliver wedding gifts to the bride's family home before the wedding day. Alternatively, the couple may register at a department store and have a list of gifts there. The shop then organizes delivery, usually to the bride's parents' house or to the reception venue.

The wedding ceremony takes place at a church, register office or possibly another favorite location, such as a hilltop. In this regard Scotland differs significantly from England where only pre-approved public locations may be used for the wedding ceremony. Most ceremonies take place mid afternoon and last about half an hour during which the marriage schedule is signed by the couple and two witnesses, usually the best man and chief bridesmaid. The newly wed couple often leave the ceremony to the sound of bagpipes.

There is generally a wedding reception following the ceremony, usually at a different venue. The bridal party, or members of it, always including the bride and groom, lines up in a receiving line and the wedding guests file past, introducing themselves. Usually a beverage is served while the guests and bridal party mingle. In some cases the drink may be whisky or wine with a non alcoholic alternative.

The best man and bride's father toast the bride and groom with personal thoughts, stories, and well-wishes, usually humorous. The groom then follows with a response on behalf of his bride. Champagne is usually provided for the toast.

There is nearly always dancing following the meal, with the style of music being selected by the couple to suit their preference. Often in Scotland this takes the form of a céilidh, a night of Scottish country dancing in couples and groups (sets) to live traditional music. This may be performed by a specialist céilidh band, though many non-specialist bands will also incorporate some traditional céilidh dances in their repertoire along with a range of music of all styles to suit tastes. The first dance is led by the bride and groom, followed by the rest of the bridal party and finally the guests.

The cake-cutting ceremony takes place; the bride and groom jointly hold a cake cutter and cut the first pieces of the wedding cake. Gifts are not opened at the reception; they are either opened ahead of time and sometimes displayed at the reception, or if guests could not deliver gifts ahead of time, they are placed on a table at the reception for the bride and groom to take home with them and open later.

It is the norm for the groom and much of the male bridal party and guests to wear kilts, although suits are also worn. Kilts and Highland dress are often rented for this purpose. A sprig of white heather is usually worn as a buttonhole for good luck.

=== Sweden ===
In a Swedish church wedding, the priest generally doesn't say when the couple may kiss each other, in contrast to Anglo-Saxon traditions. It is probably because the kiss doesn't traditionally belong to Swedish wedding customs, but has relatively recently been associated with marriage.

In Swedish weddings, the bride and groom usually go down the aisle together, rather than the bride being escorted by her father. The symbolism is that of a free man and a free woman voluntarily uniting in marriage.

It is custom in Sweden that instead of guests bringing gifts for the bride and groom, they will pay for the dinner and drinks in order to help pay for the cost of the wedding. An older tradition is that the bride's parents will give her one gold and one silver coin, which she puts in her shoe.

It is customary to have a simple wedding party, consisting of one or two bride's maid and one groom's man. Lastly, at the wedding party the couple is placed at the head of a U-shaped table instead of a separate head table for the bridal party.

== North America ==
=== United States of America ===
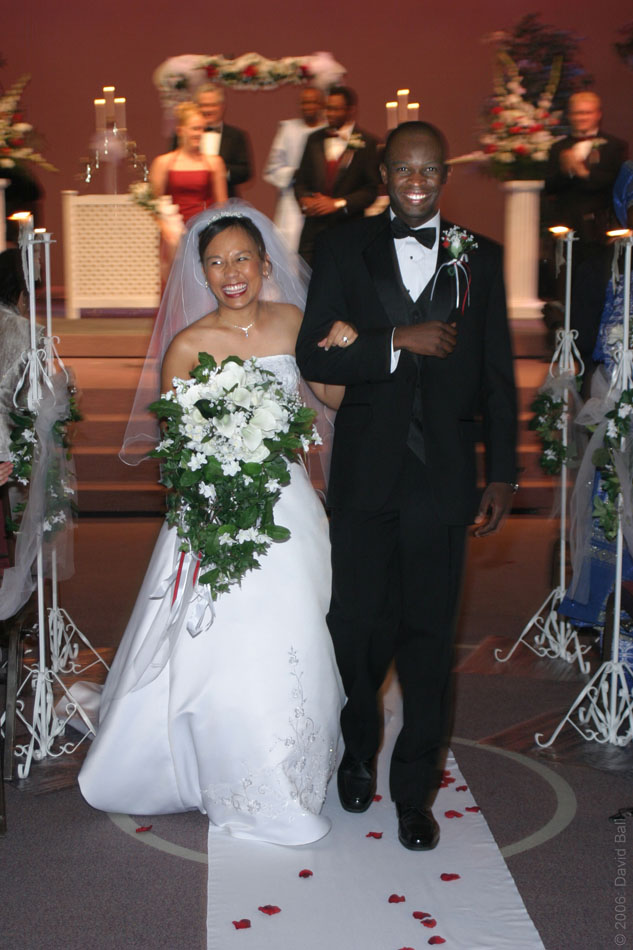
A 2004 California wedding between a Filipina bride and a Nigerian groom

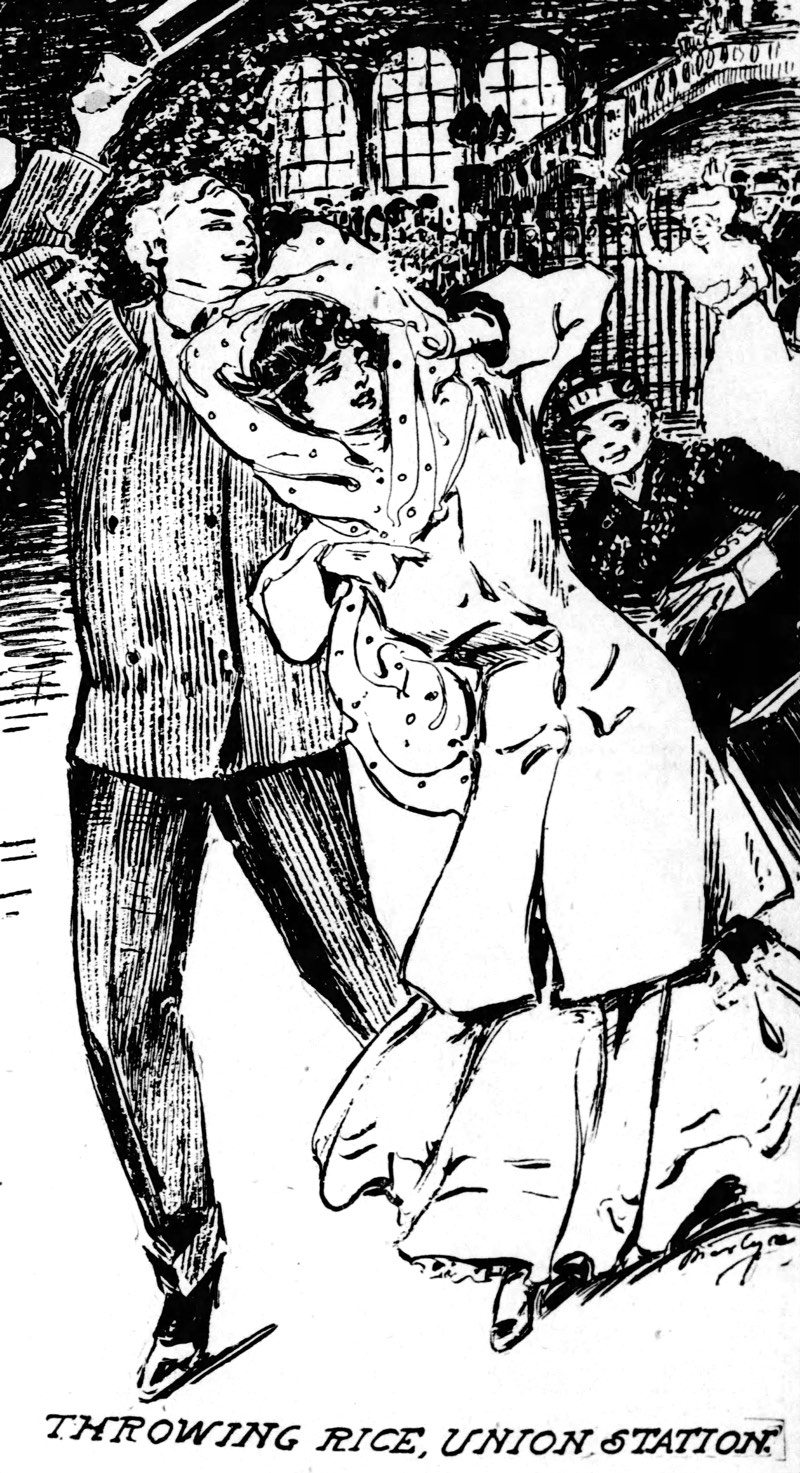
Fanciful drawing by journalist Marguerite Martyn of a newly married couple dodging rice thrown at them, 1906

In a typical year there are about 2.2 million weddings in the United States and this is expected to rise to 2.6 million in 2022. According to wedding website The Knot, 10 percent of weddings will be held on Monday through Thursday in 2022 mainly due to the increase in Saturday vows and lower costs of weekday weddings.

Most weddings in the United States follow a similar pattern to an English wedding. It traditionally follows the white wedding type, which originates from the white color of the bride's wedding dress, but refers to an entire wedding routine. Customs and traditions vary, but common components are listed below.

==== Before the wedding ====
- The host sends invitations to the wedding guests, usually one to two months before the wedding. Invitations may most formally be addressed by hand to show the importance and personal meaning of the occasion. Large numbers of invitations may be mechanically reproduced. As engraving was the highest quality printing technology available in the past, this has become associated with wedding invitation tradition. Receiving an invitation does not impose any obligation on the invitee other than promptly accepting or declining the invitation, and offering congratulations to the couple.
- While giving any gift to the newlywed couple is technically optional, nearly all invited guests who attend the wedding choose to do so. Wrapped gifts can be brought to the wedding ceremony or reception, but it's considered thoughtful to have them delivered to the address on the wedding invitation or to the address given with the couple's bridal registry. Typical gifts are useful household items, such as dishes, silverware, kitchen utensils and appliances, or towels. Guests are not obligated to use the couple's registry information.
- A color scheme is selected by some to match everything from bridesmaids' dresses, flowers, invitations, and decorations, though there is no necessity in doing so.
- The groom's friends throw a party for the groom, called a "bachelor party". It usually involves alcohol and racy entertainment, as this is supposedly the groom's last chance to engage in debauchery before marriage. It has become increasingly popular for the bride's friends to organize similar "bachelorette" parties.

==== At the wedding ====
- A wedding ceremony may take place anywhere, but often a church, courthouse, or outdoor venue is selected. The ceremony may be dictated by the couple's religious practices, or lack thereof. The most common non-religious form is derived from a simple Anglican ceremony in the Book of Common Prayer, and can be performed in less than ten minutes, although it is often extended by inserting music or speeches.
- American brides usually wear a white, off-white, silver, or other very light-colored dress, particularly at their first marriage. Brides may choose any color, although black is strongly discouraged by some as it is the color of mourning in the west.
- Rice, white seeds, or confetti is sometimes thrown at the newlyweds as they leave the ceremony to symbolize fertility. Some individuals, churches or communities choose birdseed due to a false but widely believed myth that birds eating the rice will burst. Because of the mess that rice and birdseed make, modern couples often leave in clouds of bubbles.
- The wedding party may form a receiving line at this point, or later at a wedding reception, so that each guest may briefly greet the entire wedding party.

==== At the wedding reception ====
- Drinks, snacks, or perhaps a full meal, especially at long receptions, are served while the guests and wedding party mingle.
- Often, best men and/or maids of honor will toast newlyweds with personal thoughts, stories, and well-wishes; sometimes other guests follow with their own toasts. Champagne is usually provided for this purpose.
- In a symbolic cutting of the wedding cake, the couple may jointly hold a cake knife and cut the first pieces of the wedding cake, which they feed to each other. In some sub-cultures, they may deliberately smear cake on each other's faces, which is considered vulgar elsewhere.
- If dancing is offered, the newlyweds first dance together briefly. Sometimes a further protocol is followed, wherein each dances next with a parent, and then possibly with other members of the wedding party. Special songs are chosen by the couple, particularly for a mother/son dance and a father/daughter dance. In some subcultures, a dollar dance takes place in which guests are expected to dance with one of the newlyweds, and give them a small amount of cash. This practice, as is any suggestion that the guests owe money to the couple, is considered rude in most social groups as it is contrary to basic western etiquette.
- In the mid-twentieth century it became common for a bride to toss her bouquet over her shoulder to the assembled unmarried women during the reception. The woman who catches it, superstition has it, will be the next to marry.
- In a similar process, her groom tosses the bride's garter to the unmarried men, followed by the man who caught the garter placing it on the leg of the woman who caught the bouquet. While still common in many circles, this practice has been falling out of favor since the 20th century.

==== Wedding gifts ====
The purpose of inviting guests is to have them witness a couple's marriage ceremony and vows and to share in their joy and celebration. Gifts for the wedding couple are optional, although most guests attempt to give at least a token gift of their best wishes. Some couples and families feel that in return for the expense they put into entertaining and feeding their guests, the guests should pay them with similarly expensive gifts or cash. Others believe this is contrary to proper etiquette. Sometimes there is a special wedding gift table at the wedding for gifts and cards.

The couple often registers for gifts at a store well in advance of their wedding. This allows them to create a list of household items, usually including china, silverware and crystalware, linens or other fabrics, pots and pans, etc. The wedding-list practice started in the US in the 1920s when a bride and a groom did not live together and a bridal registry was a way of helping young couples to set up their home. Registries are intended to aid guests in selecting gifts the newlyweds truly want, and the service is sufficiently profitable that most retailers, from luxury shops to discount stores, offer the opportunity. Registry information should, according to etiquette, be provided only to guests upon direct request, and never included in the invitation. Some couples additionally or instead register with services that enable money gifts intended to fund items such as a honeymoon, home purchase or college fund. Some find bridal registries inappropriate as they contravene traditional notions behind gifts, such as that all gifts are optional and delightful surprises personally chosen by the giver, and that registries lead to a type of price-based competition, as the couple knows the cost of each gift. Traditionally, weddings were considered a personal event and inviting people to the wedding who are not known to at least one member of the couple well enough to be able to choose an appropriate gift was considered inappropriate, and registries should therefore be unnecessary. Whether considered appropriate or not, others believe that weddings are opportunities to extract funds or specific gifts from as many people as possible, and that even an invitation carries an expectation of monetary reward rather than merely congratulations.

Letters of thanks for any gift are traditionally sent promptly after the gift's receipt. Tradition allows wedding gifts to be sent up to a year after the wedding date. Thanks should be sent as soon as possible, preferably within two weeks.

==== African-American customs ====
Jumping the broom developed out of the West African Asante custom. The broom in Ashanti and other Akan cultures also held spiritual value and symbolized sweeping away past wrongs or warding off evil spirits. Brooms were waved over the heads of marrying couples to ward off spirits. The couple would often but not always jump over the broom at the end of the ceremony.

The custom took on additional significance in the context of slavery in the United States. Slaves had no right to legal marriage; slaveholders considered slaves property and feared that legal marriage and family bonds had the potential to lead to organization and revolt. Marriage rituals, however, were important events to the Africans, who came in many cases come from richly ceremonial African cultures.

Taking marriage vows in the presence of a witness and then leaping over the handle of a broom became the common practice to create a recognized union. Brooms are also symbols of the hearth, the center of the new family being created.

== South America ==
=== Brazil ===
May is traditionally when couples get wed in Brazil and is sometimes referred to as mês das noivas (Bride's month).
