= Registrar =

A registrar is an official keeper of records made in a register. The term may refer to:

== Education ==
- Registrar (education), an official in an academic institution who handles student records
- Registrar of the University of Oxford, one of the senior officials of the university

== Government records ==
- Registrar (law), the official in charge of a court registry, usually a judicial appointment
- Registrar of Companies, India
- Registrar general, government officer in Britain and Commonwealth nations concerned with civil registration
- Registrar General's Department, the Government of Ghana agency responsible for the registration of companies and business
- Registrar of the treasury, an office of the United States Treasury Department
- County registrar, an official of the Irish Circuit Court who carries out quasi-judicial and administrative functions
- Office of the Registrar of Indigenous Corporations, an Australian Government statutory office
- Superintendent Registrar, the senior official at a Register office (United Kingdom)
- Registrar Office of Credit Reporting Agencies, a statutory office under the Ministry of Finance (Malaysia) responsible for the regulation of private credit reporting agencies

=== Canada ===
- Registrar General of Canada, responsible for registering all documents issued under the Great Seal of Canada or the Privy Seal of Canada
- Registrar of Imported Vehicles, a program to help regulate Canada Motor Vehicle Safety Standards

=== Hong Kong ===
- Registrar General of Hong Kong, the title of two now-defunct government positions in Hong Kong
- Registrar (Hong Kong), a type of judicial officer
- Registrar of Companies, the head of the Companies Registrar

== Medicine ==
- Registrar (medicine), a doctor, dentist, or public health practitioner undergoing specialty training in the UK and Commonwealth nations
- Senior registrar, a doctor, dentist, or public health practitioner in the latter stages of specialty training in the UK and Commonwealth nations

== Technology and telecommunication ==
- Registrar (software), software used in the personnel or human resources (HR) area of businesses
- Domain name registrar, a company authorized to register Internet domain names
  - Drop registrar, a domain name registrar who registers expiring Internet domain names
- SIP registrar, a Session Initiation Protocol endpoint that accepts REGISTER requests

== Other uses ==
- Registrar (Church of England), an ecclesiastical office
- Registrar (cultural property), responsible for implementing policies and procedures that relate to caring for collections
- The British term for a stock transfer agent

== See also ==
- Register (disambiguation)
- Registrar of Copyrights (disambiguation)
- Registry (disambiguation)
