= Register =

Register or registration may refer to:

== Computing ==
- Register (C programming language), a reserved word (keyword) and type modifier
- Hardware register, a group of memory cells, typically flip-flops, that stores a collection of bits
- Processor register, a hardware register inside a central processing unit
- Quantum register, a system comprising multiple qubits

== Graphics and visual arts ==
- Register (art), the separation of multiple pictographic scenes from each other
- Image registration, process of transforming different sets of data into one coordinate system
- Printing registration, in color printing, the correlating of colors in a single image

== Linguistics ==
- Register (phonology), a sound system that combines tone with phonation
- Register (sociolinguistics), a form of a language used for a particular purpose or in a particular social setting
- Vocal register, the range of tones in the human voice

== Literature ==
- Periodicals named Register
- Registration acts (comics), fictional legislation that is a focus in Marvel Comics

== Music ==
- Register (music), the relative "height" or range of a note, melody, part, instrument, etc.
- Register, a 2017 album by Travis Miller
- Registration (organ), the art of combining the different sounds of a pipe organ to produce the desired sound

== People ==
- Register (surname), a list of people with the surname

== Places ==
- Register, Georgia, a town in the US

== Record management ==
- Register (codebook), a document used for gathering and storing cryptography codes
- Register (records management), a list of registers (information collections) and associated registration processes
- Register.com, a domain registrar
- User registration, the process of becoming a registered user

== Other uses ==
- Register (air and heating), synonym of "grille", "return" in HVAC system
- Camera register or flange focal distance, distance from the mounting flange to the film plane of an interchangeable lens camera
- Cash register, a device for recording cash transactions and storing cash

== See also ==
- Registered (disambiguation)
- Registrar (disambiguation)
- Registry (disambiguation)
