= Registered =

Registered may refer to:

- Registered mail, letters, packets or other postal documents considered valuable and in need of a chain of custody
- Registered trademark symbol, symbol ® that provides notice that the preceding is a trademark or service mark.

== See also ==
- Register (disambiguation)
- Registered memory, a type of computer memory
