= Register (records management) =

In records management, register or registration may refer to:

== Organizations ==
- Company register, a record of organizations in the jurisdiction they operate under
- Registration statement, a set of U.S. legal documents (including prospectus) required prior to a public offering

== People ==
- Register, official student records kept by an academic institution's Registrar
- Civil registration, government recording of births, marriages, and deaths
- Family register, a registry used to track information of genealogical or legal interest
- Resident registration, government recording of place of residence
- Summit register (or canister), record of visitors to a mountain's summit
- Voter registration, entry onto an electoral roll

== Vehicles ==
- Aircraft registration, registration of an aircraft with a government authority
- Motor vehicle registration, compulsory registration of a vehicle with a government authority

=== Ships ===
- Ship registration, the process by which a ship is documented
- Naval Vessel Register, the official inventory of ships and service craft in custody of or titled by the United States Navy
- Norwegian International Ship Register, a Norwegian ship register for Norwegian vessels
- Norwegian Ship Register, a domestic ship register for Norway

== Other ==
- Accession Register, identifiers assigned to each acquisition in a library or archive
- Check register, booklet used to record account transactions
- Register (General Land Office), head of a district office which sold public lands under the United States' General Land Office system

== See also ==
- List of ship classification societies, which often include "Register" in the organization name
- Register (disambiguation)
