= Service List Registry =

Audiovisual service discovery platform based on open standards

Service List Registry Limited
- Company type: Private
- Industry: Communication Services, Media & Entertainment
- Founded: April 12, 2022; 4 years ago in London, United Kingdom
- Headquarters: London, United Kingdom
- Area served: Worldwide
- Website: www.slrdb.org

The Service List Registry (SLR) provides an online directory of audiovisual services, based on open standards for Digital Video Broadcasting. The Service List Registry enables any compatible client device or application to query a distributed online database to retrieve lists of relevant media services and obtain technical details of how to access them over various delivery networks.

The federated online directory is based on the open DVB-I standard for Service Discovery and Programme Metadata, developed by the European Broadcasting Union and the DVB Project based in Geneva. It is part of a suite of standards used to deliver digital radio and television services in Europe and many other countries around the world.

== Purpose ==
The purpose of the Service List Registry is to enable "Simple Service Selection on any screen". It provides a means for internet-connected devices and displays to offer access to audiovisual services that may be delivered over various transmission networks.

The SLR platform allows registered regulators, producers, distributors and service providers to administer lists of audio and video services available online and through traditional broadcast networks.

Compatible devices and applications can use the Service List Registry to discover and access audio and video services from various sources, including fixed and wireless internet connections and traditional cable, satellite and terrestrial transmissions.

== History ==
The Service List Registry platform was developed to support DVB-I, a Digital Video specification developed by the DVB Project. The DVB established a group to begin the definition of DVB-I in October 2017. Work on the commercial requirements for DVB-I began in January 2018 and the terms of reference were agreed in March 2018. The initial service discovery elements were defined by November 2018. The specification was approved by the DVB in November 2019. It was first published as a DVB BlueBook in June 2020 and as an ETSI standard in November 2020.

The DVB-I standard defines the technical function of a Service List Registry or SLR as an HTTP endpoint available at a known URL that, if queried, can return a list of Service List Entry Points. It does not specify how the SLR collects and stores such information.

In June 2021, the DVB Project commissioned a reference implementation of a skeleton DVB-I Central Service List Registry as a proof of concept for verification and validation of the specification. This was developed by Sofia Digital in Tampere, Finland and released as open source software in December 2021. A federated system that allows a level of national control of regulated lists of appropriately authorized services was proposed in March 2022.

Service List Registry Limited was incorporated as a separate entity in April 2022 to provide the service discovery platform. The Service List Registry launched at DVB World in Brussels on 18 May 2022. Three months after launch, a pilot programme was announced for participants to join the Service List Registry. The first public demonstration of the Service List Registry platform was provided at the international IBC Show trade convention in Amsterdam on 9-12 September 2022.

In November 2024, the HbbTV Association appointed the Service List Registry to run the registry platform enabling HbbTV Application Discovery over Broadband. This will enable unique identifiers carried in media streams reaching TV sets to be resolved to an online address that is used to access and load an HbbTV application.

The Service List Registry announced in March 2025 the development of an OpenAPI Application Programming Interface specification to facilitate the adoption and implementation of the DVB-I standard.

In May 2026, the Service List Registry announced a collaboration with Ocean Blue Software to connect the SLR Unified Service Platform with a high-performance DVB-I Client developed by OBS and their DVB-I Inspector, an analysis, validation, and continuous monitoring tool.

== Implementation ==
As specified in the open DVB-I standard, a compatible device, display or application can make an online query request to the Service List Registry server, specifying parameters such as language, country or technical capabilities, and in response will receive a list of relevant audiovisual service offerings. From this the device is able to request one or more service offerings and receive a list of services with technical details of how to access specific service instances over various delivery networks. An internet connected device can therefore determine which services can be presented depending on available distribution systems.

== Significance ==
The Service List Registry provides a structured directory of television and video services based on open standards, allowing receivers and applications to discover and access lists of services available across different countries, regions, and delivery methods.

The registry references information from authoritative sources, which may include regulated national service lists. It enables interoperability between various service providers and devices from multiple manufacturers and independent developers. It determines the structure of services without specifying the user interface, allowing for innovation. By describing services within a standard structure, it supports a transition from traditional broadcast to online delivery, enabling services to evolve while maintaining a consistent and coherent user experience as viewing environments continue to change.

== See also ==
- Digital Video Broadcasting
