= Wedding registry =

Retail gift shopping assistance

A bridal registry or wedding registry is a service provided by a website or retail store that assists engaged couples in the communication of gift preferences to wedding guests. Selecting items from store stock, the couple lists desired items and files this list with the chosen merchant. The list is then made available to wedding guests, either by the couple's family or by the merchant. Upon the purchase of a listed item, the merchant updates the gift registry accordingly. In addition to providing valuable information for the buyer, the system helps prevent the receipt of duplicate or unwanted gifts, potentially saving time for both the giver and recipient. Research on online wedding registries suggests that the average price of items on a registry can serve as a reference point for gift givers. A study of 555 online wedding registries found that gifts priced near the registry average were less likely to be purchased than somewhat higher- or lower-priced items, consistent with competing motivations to provide a more socially valuable gift or to limit monetary cost.

The Chicago-founded department store Marshall Field's first instituted the practice of a bridal registry in 1924 at its Marshall Field and Company Building as a means for the engaged couple to indicate chosen china, silver, and crystal patterns to family and friends. US-based Target stores pioneered the electronic self-service gift registry in 1993, using a service provided by The Gift Certificate Center of Minneapolis. William J. Veeneman (the founder and CEO of The Gift Certificate Center) and others invented and subsequently patented the technology.

Since the turn of the 21st century, the traditional concept of the bridal registry has evolved. As of 2015 there are now more specialized versions such as the honeymoon registry, baby registry, house registry, and charity registry. Additionally, there are registry services that allow registrants to place items from many stores on a single registry (commonly called universal registries).

In the UK, bridal registries are more commonly known as wedding lists. It is common for couples to send out a copy of their wedding list details with their wedding invitations. There has also been a recent trend towards gift-list services that allow the couple to add almost anything to their gift list—such as contributions to their honeymoon, flights, or experience days, as well as traditional gifts from any store.
