= Register (surname) =

Register is a surname. It may refer to:

- Cheri Register, American author and teacher
- George Scott Register (1901–1972), American lawyer
- John Register (1936–1996), American painter
- Matthew Register, Canadian ice hockey player
- Paul J. Register (1899–1941), United States Navy officer and namesake of more than one United States Navy ship
- Sam Register, American television executive
- Steven Register, American baseball player
