= Registrar of Copyrights =

Registrar of Copyrights is a designation in many countries of the world, who heads the Copyright office and looks after registration of copyrights in the relevant jurisdiction.

Registrar of Copyrights may refer to:

- Register of Copyrights (United States of America)
- Registrar of Copyrights (India)
