= List of periodicals named Register =

Register has been a popular name for newspapers and other periodicals. Following is a list of publications of these types that have borne the name.

== Australia ==
- South Australian Register, later The Register, originally the South Australian Gazette and Colonial Register

== United Kingdom ==
- Sheffield Register, England
- Socialist Register, an annual British journal
- The Register, a technology news website

== United States ==
- The Register, one of the former names of The Westmoreland Republican
- Federal Register, a public journal of the United States federal government
- Napa Valley Register, Napa Valley, California
- National Catholic Register, the oldest national Catholic newspaper in the United States
- New Haven Register, Connecticut
- Orange County Register, Santa Ana, California
- Social Register, one of a number of directories of prominent American families
- The Des Moines Register, Iowa
- The New England Historical and Genealogical Register, Boston, Massachusetts
