= Registrar (software) =

Human resources software

Rich Silton on the left and Phil Bookman the founders of Silton-Bookman Systems at the 1989 user conference at The Hyatt hotel on Union Square in San Francisco

Registrar was software used in the personnel or human resources (HR) area of businesses from 1984 to 2000. It was the first piece of software developed to provide HR with the ability to manage training administration, booking people on courses, sending call-up letters, and recording their attendance. It enabled HR users to build their own data dictionaries without any help from their IT people.

The Registrar software was created by Silton-Bookman Systems (SBS). It was launched in the US in 1984 and became one of the leading training administration software programs on the market with over 5000 installations. It was eventually incorporated into an LMS when SBS merged with Pathlore in 2000. Therefore, Registrar itself is no longer available for sale. Pathlore was subsequently acquired by SumTotal Systems in 2005.

== History ==
Phil Bookman and Richard Silton formed the company of SBS based in Cupertino in California in 1983. Richard Silton had been the HRD manager for Memorex, and was frustrated that his IT department could not provide him with software to manage the training of his company employees. He mentioned this to his friend Phil Bookman, who told him that he could write the software to do this, so they started the company. The “killer application” part of the product was that users were able to configure the data dictionary themselves without the need for IT assistance, which made the product unique to each client's requirements.

=== Releases ===
It took SBS about 6 months to produce a working system, and the first release of Registrar was version 1.1 in 1984 which ran under the MS-DOS operating system, and used the Btrieve database management system from Softcraft in Austin, Texas. Version 1.1 was chosen as SBS thought that no one would buy version 1.0., just as there was never a dBase I the first release being dBase II

There were various further releases, and version 1.34 became the stable DOS version.

With the advent of the Windows operating system, SBS released a Windows version in 1994, this time using the Xbase database management system.

A SQL version was released some time later, quickly followed by an Oracle version both running in parallel with the Windows Xbase version.

=== Marketing ===
SBS started off by producing demonstration disks which clients could have without charge, and then if they liked the product, they could order a working version. The demonstration came preloaded with data, and allowed a small number records to be added which was reset each time the demo was loaded. This worked very well as the client could see the product and its capabilities before committing to purchase. The first company to buy the product was IBM Canada, closely followed by McDonald-Douglas Automation and Buick.

=== Development ===
The DOS version was written using Microsoft QuickBasic, but the Windows and subsequent versions were written mainly in C++ with some modules in Visual Basic. Many clients wrote their own add-on application themselves, such as interfaces to billing systems. The fact, that Registrar had both export and import facilities in various formats made this very easy.

=== European operation ===
European Registrar launch at Blenheim Palace by John Matchett Limited. Rich Silton is in the middle and John Matchett is on the left. Mark Homer is the other person who was in charge of Registrar in Europe

Registrar was being used in Europe, but it was not until a distributor was appointed in 1989 that it really took off there. The distributor was John Matchetts Limited, based in Banbury, Oxfordshire, UK. Matchetts were very successful, and had over 500 clients using the Registrar software, not only in Europe but also in the Middle East.

== Features ==
=== People ===
This was a list of people held in the Registrar system. They could be entered manually, imported or templated from existing people. The DOS version was limited to 32,000 people, which obviously caused a minor problem for companies with over 32,000 people, but later version the size was only limited by the size of the storage. People could be made Inactive when they left the company, but the training record was still retained. People could be made Inactive either manually or automatically by a flag. People made inactivate could be made active again at any time. A unique key was used to identify people and this could be any field that the users chose i.e., Social Security number, national insurance number, employee number. For people who did not have a unique key, the system would generate one for them.

=== Person plans ===
In this day and age, most companies plan development for their people. Part of this development would possibly be attending training, and Registrar had the facility to store the training that a person was planning to attend. It could store the type of training, the date by which the training should be taken and record when that training had taken place automatically. Not only that, but the person would become a possible candidate for all courses of the same type automatically. If the training had not taken place within one year of the due date, it would be removed from the person plan but a warning would be generated. Registrar would also check that the person had met any prerequisites that had been set for the intended training, and warn if they had not been met.

=== Groups ===
Within a company there are normally groups of people. It might be people working for a certain manager, or they might belong to Personnel, or they might work Externally. Registrar had the ability to Group people either manually or automatically the later being decided upon the values of a field. i.e., if there were a field called Internal/External having the values I and E, then a Group could be created for External. If a person had a value of E, then they would automatically become a member of that Group. A person could be a member of as many Groups as required.

=== Courses ===
This was a list of the products that the company was prepared to arrange. The name "Courses" caused some confusion at the start for the users as in Registrar-speak, a Course was not an actual event just a list of events that could be arranged. The name given to an actual event was a Class and again this initially led to some confusion.

=== Class ===
This was an actual event on an actual date (or multiple dates) that was potentially going to be run which people would attend. The name "Class" led to some confusion with the users, as people were used to saying that they were "going on a Course", but in Registrar-speak, they were actually "going on a Class". As this terminology was only used by the administration people themselves they soon got used to it.

=== Curricula ===
The later Windows and RDBMS versions had Curricula. Curricula were a collection of training courses that an individual or Group could attend.

=== Registrations ===
Registrar came with six built in registration statuses: Enrolled, Waiting, Finished, Cancelled, Cancelled Bill and Miscellaneous. However, these could all be changed and added to by the actual client with resorting to IT support. For example, a No Show registration could be created to mark people who did not turn up. Reports could be run against these registration e.g., if the manager wanted to know the names of people who No Showed twice during the last six months this could easily be produced. Checks were made at the time of registration i.e., let's make sure we are not sending this person to two Classes that run at the same time. Any conflicts were flagged up and these checks could be made hard or soft.

=== Rosters and transcripts ===
The product being from the US had certain words that were American in origin. One such word was "Roster". This did cause some confusion in Europe, but administration people soon took it on board. A Roster was just a list of people attached to a Class. They would have a status within that Class be it enrolled, waiting, cancelled etc. The Roster had some very sophisticated operations that could be performed such as copying/moving from one Class to another.

Transcripts another American word purely meaning a Persons training record and future training events they were expected to attend. It could also contain other events that had not been administered by the training administration people that needed to be recorded against the person i.e., maybe the person had been on an away day, or they had obtained some certification that needed to be recorded.

=== Letters and emails ===
A vital facility is to tell people about training be it call up letters, letters or confirmations, certificates of attendance. Registrar had the ability to do these both manually and automatically either by letter or email. In the early versions of Registrar it had a built-in letter writer, but later as Microsoft Word became the dominant word processing package, Registrar just linked to Word, and passed the data to it to be merged into the letters or emails.

Letters could either be sent one at a time, to a whole Class or triggered automatically by a date field. i.e., a call up letter could be trigger to send a latter to all the Enrolled people two weeks before the Class was due to run. Registrar also had several other very sophisticated was of sending letters and emails.

=== Budgets ===
The early version of Registrar had an add on called The Accountant, but this was incorporated into Registrar. Budget categories could be declared and used as required in each Class. It allowed close control of budgets for training, for example the break even point for the numbers of enrollments to make the Class profitable would be calculated automatically. The profit from each Class would also be available. These figures could be incorporated into reports to give an overall financial position for any period in time.

=== To do lists ===
Registrar could generate a report giving a list of tasks that needed to be done by the administration staff. To Do's could be declared and then a Course/Class could have any of them applied to it. Also Who was supposed to do this task could be set up. The report would be grouped by the Who and what the task was and the date it was supposed to be done. When the ToDo had been done the administration people would mark it as done in the Class and then it would not be included in the ToDo reports as it had been completed.

=== Importing and exporting ===
Registrar had the capability to import and export data. The most common use of importing was to import 'People Data' which usually came from a Human Resources (HR) system. Some clients did this once whilst others did it on a regular basis, relying on the HR system to create people's records, instead of manually doing this in Registrar. An import data dictionary was set up to map fields to the required location. Similarly an export data dictionary was set up for exporting.

=== Intranet and the Internet ===
SBS introduced the facility for users to actually look at their own individual training record and also make and change registrations for themselves, if allowed to do so. This product was initially called Personal Registrar but was changed to Student Center. This worked over a network within the users company which enabled people to use this facility from any computer attached to the network.

=== Report writers ===
The DOS version of Registrar came with its own built in report writer which was adequate. However, from the Windows version on it was decided to let users use their own report writer. This gave much better capability and most users were already using a report writer of some sort. SBS recommended Crystal Reports but others could be used such as Business Objects or Cognos.

=== Call registrar ===
This was a system whereby users could call in and use a MF4 tone dialing telephone the user could actually make bookings. This was prior to the Internet, coming into common use and a first step at remote bookings. This was implemented in the US, but did require a special interface card. It was not implemented in Europe because the telephone system being different and the cost of developing another interface card. Call Registrar was superseded by Student Center.

John Matchetts, the European distributor, also started running user conferences in the early 1990s.

== Training courses ==
SBS started to run training courses on Registrar about a year after the product was launched. These became very popular, and gave users a fast track to using the product. The size of the US was a problem because of the traveling required; however, this is nothing new, the US being so vast. In Europe it was much easier to deliver the tutor-led training.

== Clients ==
Registrar had an impressive list of clients. The software was originally designed to be used by small to medium size companies but in fact it turned out that many large companies became users. Here are just a few of the European clients 3M, British Airways, Alcatel, Arcadia, Astra Zeneca, AT&T, Barclays, BBC, Black & Decker, BMW, British Aerospace, BT, CAA, Carillion, Coca-Cola, DCUK, Deloitte & Touche, DHL, Dow Jones, DTI, Eurostar, Ford, Glaxo, J P Morgan, Jaguar Cars, JCB, Land Rover, Magnox, Merrill Lynch, National Grid, Nissan, Nokia, Norwich Union, Open University, RAF, Rank Xerox, Rover Cars, Royal Navy, Sheppard Moscow, Siemens, TNT, UN, US Army, VAG, Vodafone, and many others.

== See also ==
- SumTotal Systems
