= Honeymoon registry =

Funding service for honeymoons

A honeymoon registry is a service, typically on the Internet, that assists engaged and married couples in financing their honeymoons.

== History ==
Honeymoon registries (also known as "travel registries"—registries for travel-related items) began in the 1990s as an additional service provided by travel agents and agencies. Some are still set up in this manner and require the wedding couple to use their travel agency to book their honeymoon. More recent honeymoon registries are not involved with the planning and booking of the honeymoon. Instead, they provide the couple with a customizable web page to share their honeymoon plans with others and accept gifts toward the honeymoon. As "non-traditional" registry options such as a honeymoon registry become more popular, large registry services have added this option to complement their "traditional" fare.

== Services offered ==
Most honeymoon registries allow a couple to create and customize a registry web page with photos and details of their upcoming wedding and honeymoon. Wedding guests are invited to visit the registry site so they may contribute a monetary gift to cover a portion of the honeymoon or a specific activity as detailed by the couple.

Other common features of honeymoon registries:

- Messaging systems that allow wedding couples to email preformatted notices of their registry to wedding guests as well as print out invitation inserts. Some services mail invitation inserts to the wedding couple, but usually charge a fee to do so.
- Full tracking of gifts to assist couples in creating “Thank You” cards.
- Gift redemption is typically via mailed check, but some services provide wire services as an option.

== Etiquette ==
As noted by The Wall Street Journal in a May 2008 review of popular honeymoon registry services:

"A honeymoon is a perfectly appropriate gift to request," says Peter Post, president of the Emily Post Institute, a Burlington, Vt., etiquette think tank. "There's no objection to it from an etiquette point of view."
