= Weddings in the United States =

Wedding customs and traditions in the US

In the United States, weddings follow traditions often based on religion, culture, and social norms. Most wedding traditions in the United States were assimilated from generally European countries. Marriages in the U.S. are typically arranged by the participants and ceremonies may either be religious or civil. As of the year 2015, all 50 U.S. states and territories permit same sex marriages that differ from the traditional bride and groom.

In a traditional wedding, the couple to be wed invite all of their family and friends. A woman who is getting married is referred to as a bride and a man who is getting married is referred to as a groom. Those with the closest relationships to the couple are selected to be bridesmaids and groomsmen, with the closest of each selected to be the maid of honor and best man.

Traditionally, U.S. weddings would take place in a religious building such as a church, with a religious leader officiating the ceremony. During the ceremony, the couple vow their love and commitment for one another with church-provided vows. The couple then exchanges rings, which symbolizes their never-ending love and commitment towards one another. Finally, for the first time in public, the couple is pronounced as married and referred to as the other's husband or wife. It is then that they share their first kiss as a married couple and thus seal their union. The couple leaves the building, and family and friends throw rice or wheat their way, which symbolizes fertility. After the actual wedding ceremony itself, there may be a wedding reception. The couple then usually goes on a honeymoon to celebrate their marriage, which lasts several days or weeks.

Modern weddings often deviate from these traditions. Weddings are sometimes held outdoors or in other buildings instead of churches, and officiants may not be religious leaders but other people licensed by the state. The religious vows may be replaced by vows written by the couple themselves, and most venues discourage some traditional activities, such as throwing rice, and encourage alternatives, such as throwing birdseed or grass seed. Other traditional elements of a wedding may be changed or omitted, and weddings may even vary wildly in format from the traditional template.

== History ==
In the 19th century, weddings were typically small, intimate ceremonies at the home of either the parents of the bride or the parents of the groom. The announcement of the newly married couple took place at their church on the Sunday following the wedding. In the 1820s and 1830s, weddings became more elaborate, when upper class couples had wedding ceremonies similar to modern custom. The bride usually wore the best dress she owned, so her dress was not always white, as white dresses were impractical to own. Not until the middle of the 19th century did brides start buying a dress made specifically for their wedding day. At the same time, couples began to hire professionals to prepare floral arrangements and wedding cakes, rather than making them at home.

Today, couples in the United States are waiting later in life to get married. The average age for males getting married in the United States is 27 years old, whereas, women's average age is 25. In the 21st century states started legalizing same sex marriages until it was permitted federally across all 50 states.

== Cultural traditions ==
=== Attire ===
Something old, something new,
Something borrowed, something blue,
A silver sixpence in her shoe.

The saying, "Something old, something new, / Something borrowed, something blue, / A silver sixpence in her shoe" dates back to the Victorian era and requires the bride to accessorize her wedding attire in certain ways to promote good luck in her new marriage. Many brides in the U.S. do this for fun. The "old" is supposed to represent the past, particularly the bond between the bride and her family. The bride might choose to wear a piece of jewelry from one of her elders, or another accessory given to her from an older relative. The "new" represents the couple getting married and their future together. Usually, the bride's wedding gown or wedding ring is used as a new item. "Something borrowed" is something that is taken from the families and meant to be returned. By borrowing something, the bride is continuing the link between herself and her family to maintain loyalty and future comfort. The borrowed item must come from a happily married woman in order to pass on marital happiness onto the new couple. "Something blue" represents the bride's faithfulness and loyalty. Easy ways for the bride to incorporate the color blue include wearing blue flowers in her hair or a blue garter. The silver sixpence is meant to be tucked into the bride's shoe and is supposed to bring the new couple wealth in money and love in their new life together.

Many brides today choose to wear white bridal dresses at their weddings. However, brides before the 19th century just wore the best dress they owned. It wasn't until the 1840s, when Queen Victoria popularized white bridal dresses by choosing to wear white instead of the traditional royal silver dress.

Brides often accompany their white wedding dresses with a veil. Sometimes seen as an accessory today, the veil has a history of symbolizing a bride's modesty and innocence, namely her virginity.

=== Before the wedding ===
There is a tradition that the prospective bridegroom ask his future father-in-law for his blessing.

Weeks before the wedding, the maid of honor may plan a wedding shower, where the bride-to-be receives gifts from family and friends. The couple may add a list of desired gifts—usually necessities for a new household, such as dishes and bedding—to a bridal registry.

The best man often organizes a bachelor party shortly before the wedding, where male friends join the groom in a "last night of freedom" from the responsibilities of marriage. A bride and her female friends may enjoy a bachelorette party to match the men's bachelor party.

Many brides have bridal showers before their wedding, during which she receives gifts from the guests. The bridal shower is usually thrown by the bride's chosen maid of honor and is humorous in nature. Although it is now seen as a fun and relaxing time for the bride, it wasn't always seen that way. Bridal showers originated in Holland for brides who were refused dowry from their fathers. A woman's friends would give her several gifts to allow her to have the necessary dowry to marry whatever man she chose.

Many couples will make precautions so that they will not be able to see each other until their wedding ceremony. Today, this is done merely to uphold tradition and superstition, but the idea stems from the early days when marriages were arranged. In these cases, the bride and groom would meet each other for the first time at their own wedding.

=== Ceremony and reception ===
During the ceremony, it is customary to include bridesmaids and groomsmen in the event. The members of the bridal party are chosen to share the happiness with the couple getting married. Including bridesmaids in the ceremony originated as a technique of confusing evil spirits as to who the actual bride was. Groomsmen originated not for protection, but many centuries ago when men had to capture women in order to marry them. In order to steal the woman they chose to marry, men needed to pick the most capable man to help him, hence "best man".

Today, "giving the bride away" has a very different meaning. The bride's father accompanies her on her walk down the aisle to show approval of the groom. Centuries ago, fathers actually did give their daughters away to their future husbands, since daughters were property of their fathers.

The officiant asks the guests if they know of any reason why the couple should not be married.

The meaning and origin of the ceremonial kiss that traditionally concludes the ceremony has several different interpretations. In the Roman era, a kiss was used to seal legal bonds and contracts. A marriage, a type of lifelong contract between two people, is sealed with the ceremonial kiss. It is also believed that this kiss allows the couples' souls to mingle together. Today, the wedding kiss is usually just used as a form of love.

At the reception, the best man and the maid of honor usually propose a toast. The couple may receive gifts.

Wedding cakes are widely seen as symbols of fertility. While now they are an enjoyable snack for the wedding guests, wedding cakes have a more serious history. Sharing the first piece of wedding cake is still a ritual in weddings, but it originated as a way to ensure fertility for the bride in her attempts to have children. Superstition says that a bride cannot bake her own wedding cake or taste it before the wedding, or else risk losing her husband's love. If she keeps a piece of the cake after the wedding, she supposedly ensures that he will remain faithful.

A way that guests at a wedding can participate in giving the bride and groom a lucky future is by the tradition of throwing rice. The superstition originated when guests would throw nuts and grains in the hope of bringing the couple a good harvest and many children to help with the harvest.

As a symbol of luck, the newly married woman traditionally throws her bouquet to the unmarried women at the wedding. The one who catches the bouquet is supposedly the next to be married.

Throwing the bride's garter to the single men at the wedding is a tradition similar to the bouquet toss. The groom must remove the garter from his new wife's leg and toss it to the single men at the wedding. It is commonly believed that this man will be the next one to marry. An older custom in England involved guests raiding the bride's chamber for stockings. These stockings taken from her room would then be thrown at the groom. Whoever landed their stocking on the groom's nose would be the next one to marry. Even earlier than these traditions, it was an ancient custom for the bride or groom to throw the bride's garter to the marriage witnesses to confirm that their marriage had been consummated.

=== After the wedding ===
After the wedding reception, the newlyweds usually leave for their honeymoon, a trip to the destination of their choice. During this trip, which lasts anywhere from a few days to a few weeks, the couple consummates their marriage. The term "honeymoon" comes from ancient Germanic weddings, where the newly married couple would drink mead for thirty days after their wedding. Weddings were only held on a night where there was a full moon. They drank the honey wine for a month, thirty days, until the next full moon, hence the name "honey moon".

The tradition of the groom carrying his new wife across the threshold has many different interpretations. The act today symbolizes luck and the bride giving the groom her virginity. Similarly in older generations, brides had to appear unwilling to give in to their new husband. The husband would pretend to force his new wife into giving in to him by carrying her over the threshold. In the days when men captured their wives and actually did force women to marry them, she was also forced over the threshold because she was unwilling.

== American traditions ==
There are not many wedding traditions that are unique to the United States because most are derived from other cultures. Most of these customs stem from Europe. Indeed, it is considered American tradition to follow the traditions of one's culture or religion. That said, some wedding traditions remain as the default in the U.S.

It is customary to give newlyweds gifts for their new home together at the wedding reception. To prevent duplicate gifts and having to return gifts that are not liked, many couples "register" at department stores. Couples pick out items they would like to receive as gifts, and their friends and family can choose to buy one of those items.

== Religious traditions ==
=== Jewish ===
In a Jewish wedding both the bride and the groom are walked down the aisle by both of their parents, which is different from other religions.

Jewish couples are married under the chupah, which resembles a decorated tent-like structure. This symbolizes that the bride and groom are coming together and creating a new home. This religious tradition comes from the Biblical wedding of Abraham and Sarah.

The ketubah is a Jewish wedding contract. Traditionally, the ketubah was written in Aramaic, but today many Jews use Hebrew instead. Many couples frame their ketubah and display it in their home. The rabbi or an honoree reads this contract under the chupah after the ring exchange.

=== Hindu ===
Hindu weddings also have some unique traditions. These range from the exchanging of garlands (Jaimala), which represents the acknowledgement of acceptance and respect, to the lighting of a sacred fire (Havan), which represents the commitment the couple has to each other. Other traditions include taking seven steps together as a married couple, wearing Henna on the hands and feet, and the groom putting a dot of sindur on his bride's forehead.

=== Christian ===
Christian weddings have many traditions that are commonly associated with weddings in general. The most important traditions for Christian weddings are the blessing and exchange of wedding bands and the bride and groom each offering his or her own wedding vows.

=== Islam ===
While most American Muslims choose to closely follow the customs of their specific culture, many will incorporate traditional American customs as well. Many Muslim brides today will wear white, and the grooms will wear tuxedos. Most will have some form of wedding party, including extended family, however, friends will usually not be in the official wedding party. Muslims will forgo the reading of vows in exchange for a nikah nama, a Muslim marriage contract.

== Size and cost ==
As of 2012, the median cost of a wedding, including both the ceremony and reception, but not the honeymoon, in the United States, was about $18,000 per wedding, according to a large survey at an online wedding website. Regional differences are significant, with residents of Manhattan paying more than three times the median, while residents of Alaska spent less than half as much. Additionally, the survey probably overestimates the typical cost because of a biased sample population.

As of 2023, the typical wedding in the US had 127 guests in attendance. Compared to previous decades, small weddings with fewer than 50 people were more popular, as were elopements. One result of smaller guest lists is that some couples choose to have a more luxurious event.

== Types of weddings ceremonies ==
=== Traditional ===
Traditional, formal, religious weddings are the most common type of wedding in the United States. Many couples opt to marry in the religious house of their faith, as it is common for couples to share the same religion. Whether the couple is Catholic, Jewish, Hindu, or any other religion, it is common practice to get married in the religious house of that faith. However, many couples today do not share the same faith. These inter-faith couples can also have a traditional wedding ceremony. Religious officials have become increasingly cooperative with marrying couples that are not of the same faith.

It is common for traditional or formal weddings to follow certain norms. These common practices include designer dresses, groomsmen wearing tuxedos, elaborate invitations, beautiful flowers, limousine service, and fine dining and live music at a reception that follows the ceremony.

=== Destination ===
Destination weddings are becoming increasingly popular in the United States. Destination weddings, or "wedding aways" and "weddingmoons", allow the couple to completely design their wedding ceremony to fit the location. From beach weddings to weddings in Las Vegas, New York City, or Niagara Falls, many Americans are choosing to marry at a location far from home. The options for destinations are limitless.

Destination weddings have several advantages. From getting to spend an extended time with family, to an easy transition to a honeymoon, destination weddings are very appealing. Additionally, while destination weddings can be very expensive, they are on average less expensive than weddings at home.

=== Military ===
A couple in which one or both is a member of either the United States Armed Forces may have a military wedding in which they wear their uniform. A military wedding is considered a formal wedding and guests should dress formally. Often, the guests will also be in the armed forces and will wear their uniforms as well.

The ushers who are in the armed forces traditionally form an "arch of steel" with their swords or sabers. However, only active duty servicemen participate, as they can only carry their sword or saber if they are active duty. The arch is usually formed at the conclusion of the ceremony, and the head usher signals the formation by yelling "center face". After the couple pass through the arch, the ushers return to their bridesmaids to exit with them. Civilian ushers may or may not stand at the arch, a decision usually made by the couple.

=== Elopement ===
To marry by elopement has traditionally meant that the wedding ceremony is done suddenly and in secret, usually with just the minimum number of witnesses necessary for legal purposes. Couples choose to elope for many varying reasons. In the 1930s, 46% of the couples in the US who eloped did so because of parental opposition to the marriage, 20% of couples eloped to avoid attention, 12% because of financial reasons, 8% due to an unexpected pregnancy, and 14% for other reasons.

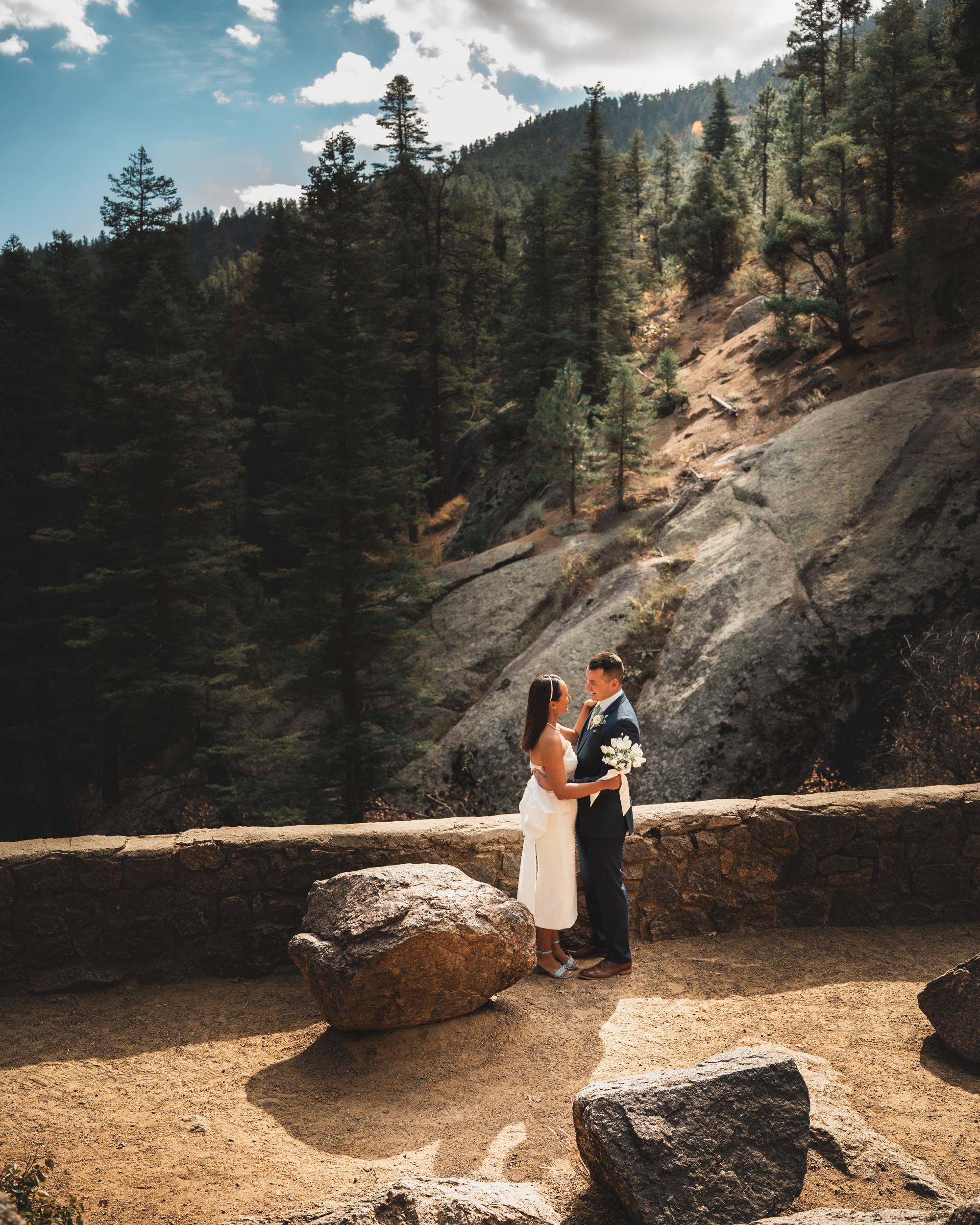
Elopement at Helen Hunt Falls in Colorado Springs, Colorado

However, in the 21st century, elopement has taken on a different style. Although it is still done without many family and friends present, the modern elopement is not always shrouded in secrecy, and the couple may pay for wedding videos and photography.

Elopements are generally less expensive. The simplest version, a civil ceremony at a courthouse, often costs between $100 and $200. If a special event is planned, however, the costs can mount up: thousands of dollars for a photographer, travel costs for the couple, their witnesses, and an officiant to their chosen destination, a bridal gown, tuxedo, or other clothes, food from a caterer or a restaurant, and so forth. Some wedding businesses specialize in organizing fancier elopements.

A growing trend in elopements involves high-end adventure experiences, where couples hire photographers or planners who also serve as officiants and guides through remote or exotic locations. These luxury elopements, which can exceed $10,000, offer a curated experience that blends travel, photography, and an intimate ceremony, often at a fraction of the cost of a traditional wedding.
