= Water salute =

Salute involving fire fighting vehicles

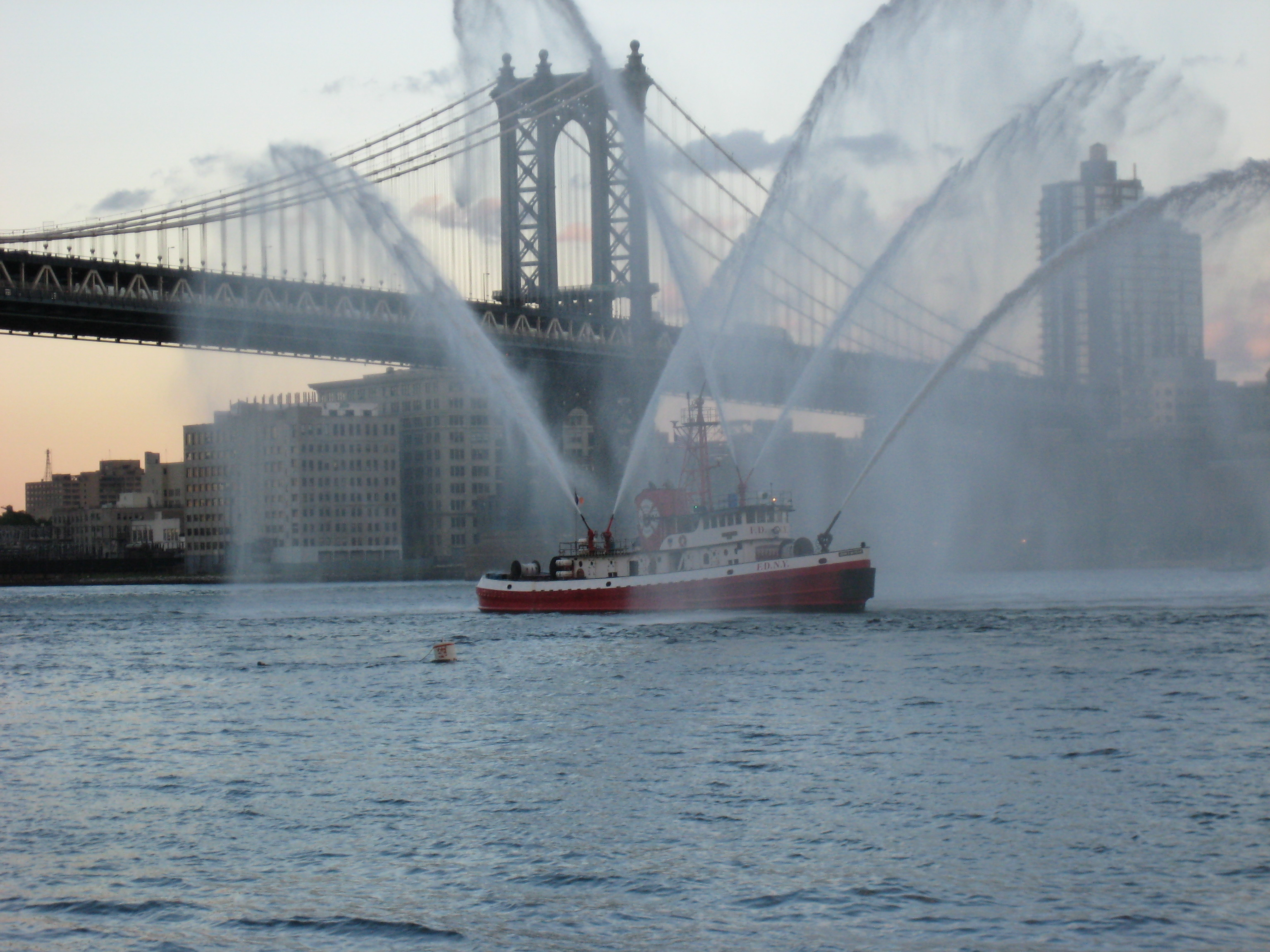
A New York City Fire Department fireboat gives a water salute for the 125th anniversary of the Brooklyn Bridge in 2008.

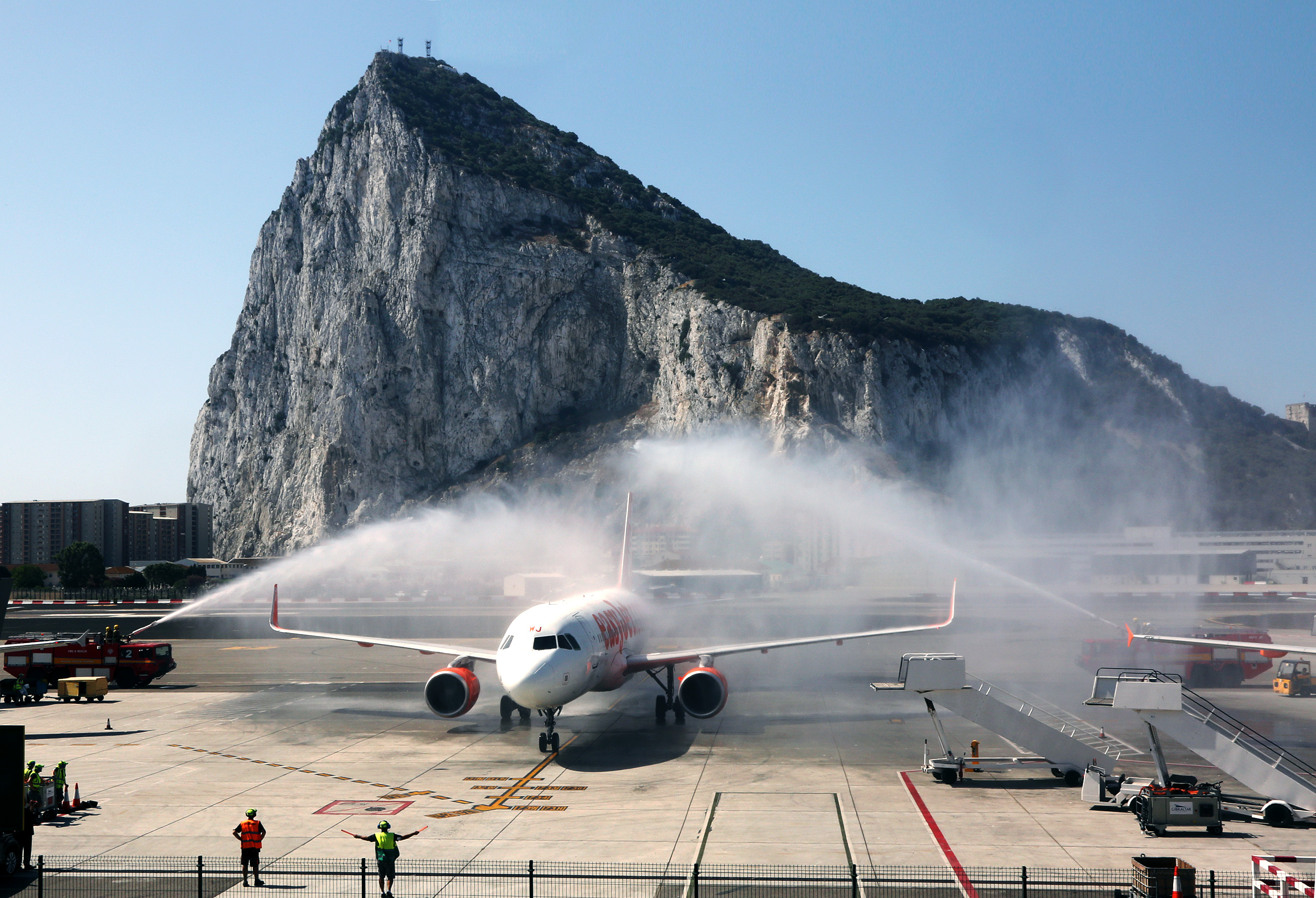
Water salute for the commencement of easyJet service at Gibraltar International Airport in 2016.

A water salute is where a vehicle travels under plumes of water expelled by one or more fire-fighting vehicles, as a mark of respect or appreciation.

At an airport, typically an even number of airport crash tender fire-fighting vehicles will arrange themselves perpendicularly along the sides of a taxiway or apron; they will emit coordinated plumes of water which form an arch (or series of arches) as an aircraft passes. Symbolically, the procession looks similar to a bridal party walking under a wedding arch or the saber arch at a military wedding.

Water salutes have been used to mark the retirement of a senior airport employee, senior pilot or air traffic controller, the first or last flight of an airline to an airport, the first or last flight of a specific type of aircraft, as a token of respect for the remains of soldiers killed in action, or other notable events. When Concorde flew its last flight in 2003 from John F. Kennedy International Airport, red, white and blue coloured plumes were used.

Water salutes are also used for ships and other watercraft, with water being delivered by fireboats. This is often done for the first or last visit or retirement of a senior captain, the first or last cruise of a ship, the visit of a warship, or other ceremonial occasions. An example was the water salute to HMS Hermes (R12) as she returned to Southampton following her part in the victory of the Falklands War.

== See also ==
- Plume (hydrodynamics)
- Salute
- Water cannon
