= Weddings in the United States and Canada =

Weddings in the United States and Canada could refer to:

- Weddings in the United States
- Marriage in Canada
