= Hoppit =

Search engine

Hoppit is a personalized search engine. It was founded by Steven Dziedzic and Emad Saghir in 2011 and headquartered in New York, New York. It was acquired in 2013 and is now a part of XO Group, Inc.

The company, whose mission is to personalize web content, in early 2012 launched "the world's 1st ambience search engine for restaurants," a website and iPhone mobile application that finds restaurants by the type of atmosphere (i.e. romantic, cozy, hipster). It is often referred to as "Pandora for restaurants" for its ability to generate search results based on a user's mood.

Later in 2012, Hoppit launched its Android app and announced that it had generated its first million recommendations via the Hoppit platform. In 2013, Hoppit's iPhone app alone generated three million recommendations.

== Awards ==
Hoppit won an award for "Best Use of Data" at NY Tech Day 2012 amongst 200 other startups. It has been featured by Apple, Inc. in the App Store and highlighted by FOX News, TechCrunch, and Mashable. Forbes called Hoppit one of the top startups "building tech for women," and Fierce Mobile Content put Hoppit in its list of "The 15 Best Android, iOS Apps of 2012."

== Acquisition ==
In late 2013, Hoppit was acquired by XO Group, Inc. (formerly "The Knot") for an undisclosed sum.
