= Sequel wedding =

Modern wedding custom

A sequel wedding is an additional marriage ceremony or reception occurring some time after a couple has already been legally married.

== Customs ==
Couples may choose to hold sequel weddings after they have already eloped or held small-scale ceremonies. These initial ceremonies are often referred to as "micro-weddings" or "minimonies", which are generally defined as having guest lists of fewer than fifty and ten people, respectively. In contrast, the more elaborate "sequel weddings" may have several hundred guests. Sequel weddings often occur weeks, months, or even years after the legal ceremony. Commonly, the motivation for sequel weddings is to be able to hold a celebration for guests who were unable to attend the first wedding while reserving legal nuptials for family and close friends.

== History ==
Having two weddings has been a common trend among celebrity couples, including Sophie Turner and Joe Jonas in 2019; Heidi Klum and Tom Kaulitz in 2019; and George Clooney and Amal Alamuddin in 2014.

Sequel weddings gained popularity in the 2020s with the rise of the COVID-19 pandemic. State-mandated lockdowns forced many couples to reschedule their weddings multiple times. As a result, many ultimately chose to marry in private ceremonies, and when restrictions subsided held a second, larger ceremony so they could invite family and friends. According to a survey by The Knot, one-third of surveyed couples who married in 2020 planned to hold an additionally ceremony in the future.

== See also ==
- Wedding vow renewal ceremony
