= Capsule (website) =

- Type: Private
- Founded: 2011
- Founder: Cyrus Farudi; Omri Cohen
- Headquarters: Manhattan Beach, California, United States
- Area served: Worldwide
- Key people: Cyrus Farudi, CEO; Omri Cohen, CTO
- Website: www.trycapsule.com

Capsule is an event planning and private group based multi-media and photo sharing social platform. Founded in 2011, it provides members with a way to share event information among group members through its website or mobile app. It has been featured in The Huffington Post and New York Mag as a top app for weddings.

== History ==
Capsule was founded in 2011 by Cyrus Faraudi and Omri Cohen. The idea came after being invited to a combined 14 weddings and 9 bachelor parties in a single year. After the first bachelor party, both found it frustrating to aggregate photos from different people on different platforms such as Facebook, Flickr, and Picasa. It was released out of beta in 2012 with a website and apps for both the iPhone and Android marketplaces.

In 2013, Capsule entered into a partnership with The Knot, an online wedding planning website operated by XO Group Inc. The partnership included The Knot integrating the group photo-sharing technology into its website, allowing users to have a central album of their wedding photos taken by others. It was also featured in a 2013 episode of "TheBeach Meets TheStreet," a weekly series on TheStreet.com.

== Usage ==
Capsule is an event planning and media sharing site, and it's equal parts organizational and social. Sharing within a capsule is limited to everyone within the capsule only. With Capsule your every connection is defined by the “Who,” “What,” “Where,” ‘Why ” graph of experience. Capsule also has a mobile app called CapsuleCam on "both Android and iPhone applications to let people communicate with their Capsules before and after events. It’s really easy to send your party photos straight to the capsule for everyone in the capsule to see".

== Features ==
Capsule operates as a private space for people to share event information. Users can chat and share content during the planning stages of the event, including photos, files, and comments. All information for the event is placed into a single conversation for everyone who is involved with the event. Those who are part of the event are referred to as a "capsule", and receive optional notifications via email or text message when new information is shared. Only those who are invited members of the capsule can view event information.

The iPhone and Android apps connect user's smartphones to the capsule, or event space, for instant photo uploads. All members of the capsule are allowed to view the photos shared by a member of the capsule. It also has a mode that allows members to see the phone being uploaded into the capsule live. Each capsule is also assigned a number for group text. A single text sent to the number will be received by all members of the capsule. Members can also order prints of photos uploaded to the capsule.

== See also ==
- Event planning
- Personal wedding website
- Photo sharing
