= Katya Katya Shehurina =

Fashion brand

- Industry: Fashion
- Founded: 2007
- Founder: Katya Shehurina
- Headquarters: Riga, Latvia
- Area served: Asia, Europe, Middle East, US, Australia
- Products: Clothing, accessories
- Website: www.shehurina.com

Katya Katya Shehurina is a fashion brand that specializes in evening gowns, wedding dresses and fashion accessories. Originally based in Latvia, the brand has gained recognition around the world, especially in Europe.

Katya Shehurina, the fashion designer for Katya Katya Shehurina, uses lace elements, exclusive fabrics, floating silk, natural fur, and handmade embroidery details.

== History ==
Katya Shehurina graduated from Esmod, a fashion design school in Paris, in 2007. Taking into account her earlier experience gained from famous French designers such as Nicolas Fafiotte and David Purves, she returned to Latvia and created her own brand in 2007.

In the early stages of the company, Katya released both pret-a-porter collections and couture clothes. Now twice a year on Riga Fashion Week, the brand presents new collections with evening and wedding dresses.

In early 2011, the brand opened an independent boutique in London.

== In media ==
In summer 2012 Nelly Furtado and Melanie C wore "Loise", a black lace dress from the collection. Jessie J wore "Pinot Noir" on The X Factor in 2011. Jacqueline Jossa also wore this dress to the National TV Awards in January 2012. Tara Palmer-Tomkinson, an English "it girl" wore the dress in a January 2012 issue of Hello! Magazine.

== See also ==
- Berta Bridal
- Nurmahali dress
