= Bridesman =

Participant in Western wedding ceremonies

A bridesman is a close male friend and/or relative of the bride, one who walks down the aisle in the bridal ceremony in the traditional place of a bridesmaid.

Charlotte Brontë made reference to bridesmen, seemingly in the modern sense, in the final chapter of her 1849 novel Shirley, which is set in Yorkshire in 1811–12: "Amongst the bridal train the most noticeable personages were the youthful bridesmen, Henry Sympson and Martin Yorke."

The term, however, has an ancient and obscure, possibly confabulated origin. The term is first noted by the Encyclopaedia Judaica from the European Jewish Diaspora of the middle of the 13th century. In this context, a bridesman was not a friend of the bride but of the groom. He paid for and arranged the wedding from his own money and would be repaid someday by the groom. It was a position of the highest level of honor in male friendship. It was akin to the modern-day best man.

In Hungary, where the word for bridesman is "vőfély" or sometimes "vőfény" (depending on the region), the ancient tradition of the bridesman is still very popular. The vőfély is the "spokesman" of the bridegroom ("vő" means son-in-law).
