= Zola (company) =

American online wedding registry

- Industry: weddings
- Founded: 2013
- Founders: Shan-Lyn Ma, Nobu Nakaguchi
- Headquarters: New York City, U.S.
- Key people: Shan-Lyn Ma (CEO)
- Website: zola.com

Zola is an e-commerce company that offers online wedding planning, retail and registry services. There is no cost or fee to register with Zola, and the female-led company generates revenue by selling wedding gifts and wedding-related items.

== History ==
Zola was founded in New York City in 2013 by Shan-Lyn Ma and Nobu Nakaguchi. It launched as the first all-in-one wedding registry platform, allowing couples to manually schedule and exchange wedding gifts online.

In 2017, Zola expanded its services to offer wedding planning through Zola Weddings. The free service includes wedding websites, guest lists, RSVP tracking, and customizable checklists. The company also introduced customized wedding invitations and save the dates in 2018.

In October 2018, Crate & Barrel and Zola partnered to allow Zola users to register for over 3,500 Crate & Barrel products. The company has received $140 million in funding, the most recent being $100 million in 2018.

In January 2019, Zola opened its first brick-and-mortar location, a pop-up shop in the Flatiron District of New York City.

The company was valued at $600 million in February 2019; a The New York Times article from that year noted that Zola was "one of three companies on the list of potential next unicorns that have been fueled by millennials' spending."

In June 2022, co-founder Nobu Nakaguchi was appointed as chief design officer.

In April 2024, Zola announced an artificial intelligence tool designed to help couples split wedding planning chores fairly.

Zola launched its “The Wedding of the Year” brand campaign in December 2025. A study conducted by Zola, which surveyed 11,500 couples, found that 84% of weddings would cost more in 2026 compared to two years ago because of the economy or tariffs.

== Services ==
=== Registry ===
According to Business Insider, some aspects of the Zola registry, include: the ability to aggregate gifts from multiple websites; a clean user interface; selection of delivery time and location for each respective gift; simple logging of thank-you cards; experiential gifts, such as Airbnb and group gifting. However, the registry lacks a physical retail space, making shipping costs for large gifts expensive. In addition to traditional gift registry options, Zola has a feature for cash giving that allows users to set up funds of their choice.

In 2019, Vox wrote, "Registries may be adapting, but there’s no indication that they’re going anywhere..." citing Zola as a major source of change in the wedding registry space.

In 2020, Zola added the option to send Change the Dates to guests, due to the COVID-19 pandemic.

=== AI ===
Zola has integrated artificial intelligence into its platform to assist couples with wedding logistics. In 2024, it added two AI programs: Split the Decisions, which helps couples divide wedding planning responsibilities, and a thank-you note generator tool available as a mobile app.

=== Other services ===
- Wedding Website
- Guest List Planning
- Wedding Attire
- Decor & Favors
- Hotel Blocks
- Wedding Vendors

== Controversy ==
In early December 2019, Zola was among several wedding planning sites who announced they would remove from their listings wedding locations that once were slave plantations. The move was a response to the civil rights advocacy group Color of Change, who contend that the use and marketing of plantations, namely those in the Antebellum South, as venues for weddings hides their history as sites of slave labor. Though Zola initially indicated that Color of Change's concerns didn't violate their anti-discrimination policies, the company indicated they would work with the organization to ensure their policies promote inclusiveness.

Later in December 2019, a Zola advertising campaign was the subject of controversy due to its airing on, and being pulled from air by, Hallmark Channel. The six-ad series featured couples of various assortments at the altar voicing vow-like regrets about not using Zola to plan their nuptials. One of the couples featured was a lesbian couple that appeared in three of the ads briefly and one 30-second spot exclusively (they are shown kissing at the altar in the latter). That couple's inclusion raised the ire of One Million Moms, with the conservative group urging Hallmark Channel to reconsider "airing commercials with same-sex couples." Hallmark Channel's parent, Crown Media Family Networks, obliged and announced on December 13 they would pull from air the four Zola ads that featured the couple, citing network policy that forbids its airing of controversial content, namely the women kissing. After being roundly criticized by LGBTQ figures, allies, and rights groups (GLAAD president Sara Kate Ellis called the move "discriminatory"), Crown Media reversed course on December 15 and reinstated the pulled ads. In response, Zola, who had severed ties with Hallmark Channel, announced they would reach out to the network to consider further advertising.
