= Berta Bridal =

Israeli fashion house

- Native name: ברטה ברידל
- Industry: Couture fashion
- Products: Wedding and evening gowns
- Website: bertabridal.com

Berta is an Israeli fashion house known for luxury bridal fashion and evening wear. Founded by the sole designer of the brand, Berta Balilti.

== History ==
Berta Balilti studied fashion at the Shenkar College of Engineering and Design in Tel Aviv prior to launching her brand in 2004.

Her studio is now in Ashdod, Israel.

Berta has been recognized by The New York Times as one of the designers who caused a shift in the bridal fashion world to a more sexy and bold style, and is covered by magazines and publications such as The Knot Worldwide, BRIDES, Style Me Pretty, Vogue, and Wedding Chicks.

== Collections ==
Berta's collection presentations have included:

- The F/W16 bridal collection presented at The Plaza Hotel during the October 2015 bridal fashion week in New York.
- The Berta S/S17 collection presented at Harvard Club of New York in April 2016.
- The F/W20 runway at the World Trade center in October 2019

== In popular culture ==
Britney Spears, Priyanka Chopra, Sharon Stone and Carrie Underwood have worn Berta evening to various events. Kylie Jenner and Kourtney Kardashian were also featured in Berta as part of the launch of the Stormi collection and a cover photoshoot to Vogue Arabia. Ariana Grande wore a mini Berta on her music video of "Don't call me angel". Sofia Vergara wore a Berta gown for the AGT 2021 finals.
