= Bridesmaid =

Participant in Western wedding ceremonies

Bridesmaids are members of the bride's party at Western wedding ceremonies. A bridesmaid is typically a young woman and often the bride's close friend or relative. She attends to the bride on the day of a wedding or marriage ceremony. Traditionally, bridesmaids were chosen from unwed young women of marriageable age.

The principal bridesmaid, if one is designated, may be called the chief bridesmaid. She may also be called the maid of honor if she is unmarried, or the matron of honor if she is married. A junior bridesmaid is a girl who is clearly too young to be married but who is included as a bridesmaid anyway. In the United States, typically only the maid or matron of honor and the best man are considered official witnesses for the wedding license.

Often there is more than one bridesmaid; in modern times the bride chooses how many to ask. Historically, no person of status went out unattended, and the size of the retinue was closely calculated to be appropriate to the family's social status. A large group of bridesmaids provided an opportunity for showing off the family's social status and wealth. Today, the number of bridesmaids in a wedding party is dependent on many variables, including a bride's preferences, the size of her family, and the number of attendants her partner would like to have as well. Many modern couples do not have bridesmaids or groomsmen, which eliminates all the associated expenses and logistical effort.

== Related roles ==
The male equivalent is the groomsman, also known in British English as an usher. In the United States, the role of attending to the groom has diverged from that of escorting guests to their seats, and the two positions are no longer synonymous and are often, if not usually, filled by different persons.

In some cultures, such as in Norway, the Netherlands, France and Victorian Britain, it is (or has been) customary for bridesmaids to be small girls rather than grown women. They may carry flowers during the wedding procession and pose with the married couple in bridal photos. In modern English-speaking countries, this role is separate from that of the bridesmaid, and the small child performing it is known as a flower girl.

== Duties ==
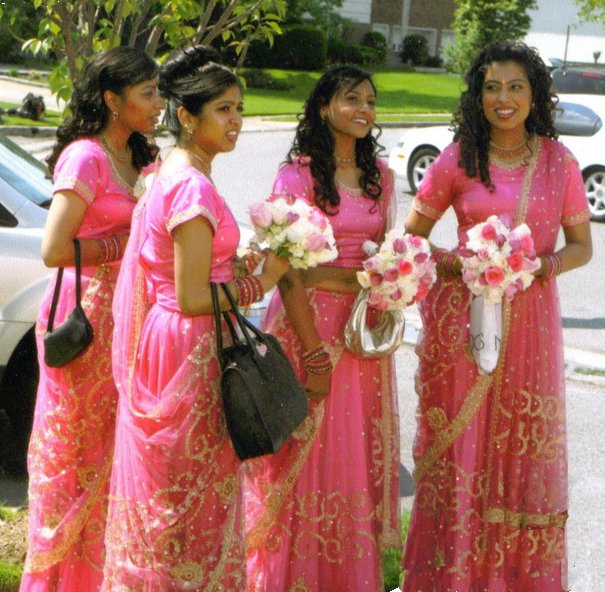
Four bridesmaids wearing gagra cholis, the traditional dress of North India

Although many exceed the minimum, the bridesmaids' required duties are very limited. They are required to attend the wedding ceremony and to assist the bride on the day of the wedding. Bridesmaids in Europe and North America are often asked to assist the bride with planning the wedding and a wedding reception. In modern times, a bridesmaid often participates in planning wedding-related events, such as a bridal shower or bachelorette party, if there are any. These, however, are optional activities; according to etiquette expert Judith Martin, "Contrary to rumor, bridesmaids are not obliged to entertain in honor of the bride, nor to wear dresses they cannot afford." If it is customary in the bride's area to have a bridesmaids' luncheon, then it is hosted, and therefore organized and paid for, by the bride.

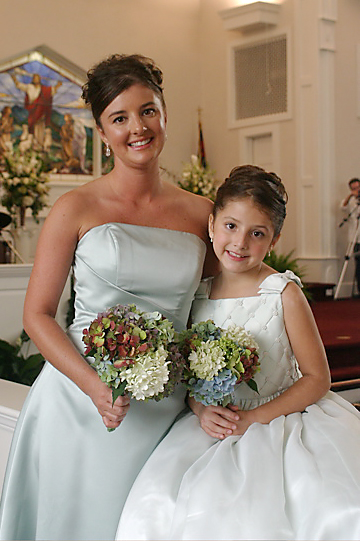
Junior bridesmaid in North Carolina, dressed in white like the bride.

The duties and costs of being a bridesmaid are parsed out between a bride and her attendants in a variety of ways. Since modern bridesmaids, unlike their historical counterparts, can no longer rely on having their clothes and travel expenses paid for by the bride's family, it has become customary for the bride to present the bridesmaids with gifts as a sign of gratitude for the support and financial commitment that comes with their roles. It has become equally customary for women who are invited to serve as bridesmaids to first ask about the amount of time, energy, and money that the bride expects from them before accepting this position, and to decline or resign if this is more than they will be able to give. In some American weddings, each bridesmaid may be asked to spend US$1,700 or more, with travel to destination weddings and pre-wedding parties usually being the biggest expense.

== Maid of honor ==
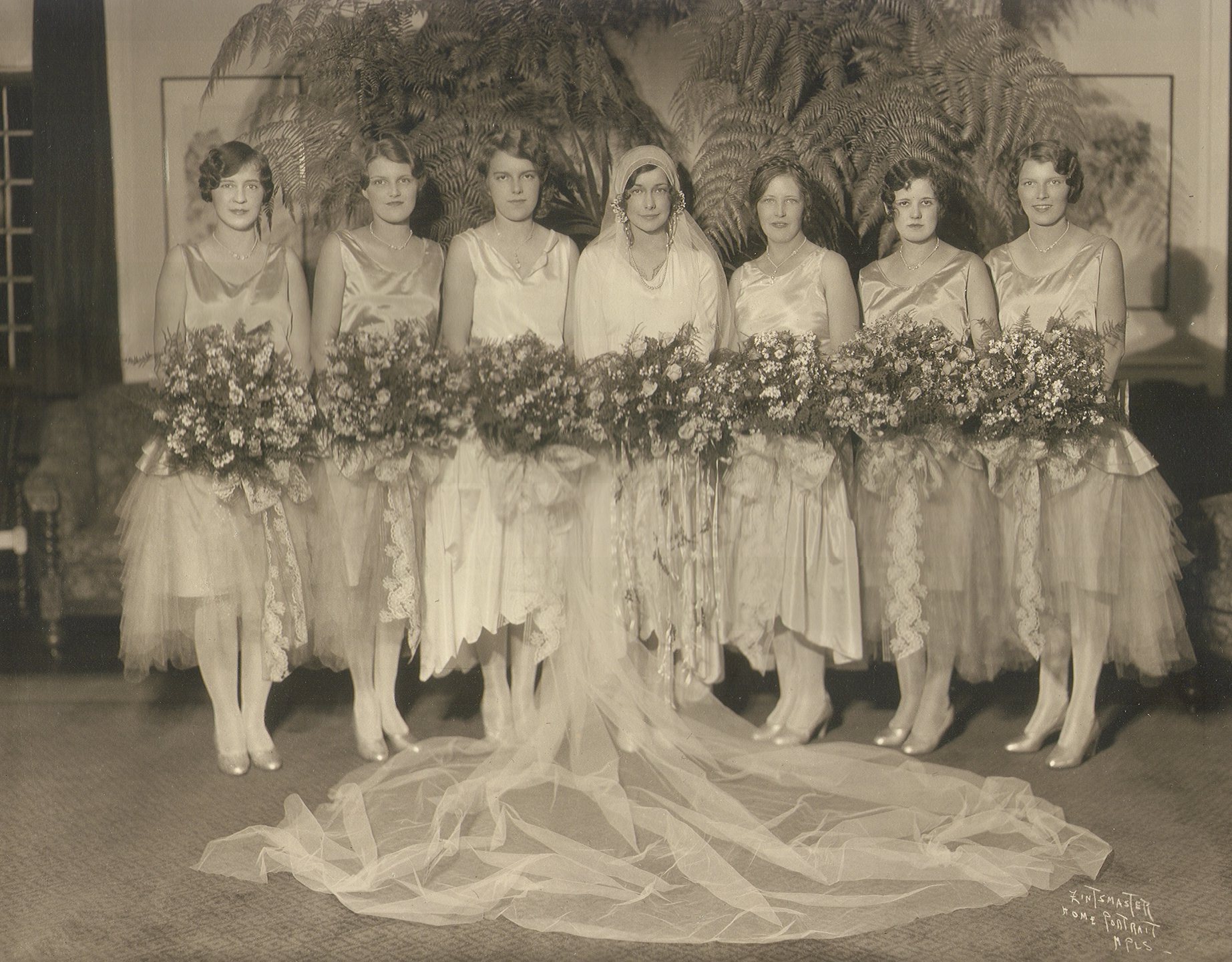
The bride (center) with her maid of honor (third from left) and bridesmaids. The maid of honor can be distinguished by her dress, which differs somewhat from that of the other bridesmaids, as well as by her position in the traditional place of honor at the immediate right of the principal party. From 1929, in Minnesota, US.

In the United Kingdom, the term "maid of honour" originally referred to the female attendant of a queen. The term 'bridesmaid' is normally used for all bridal attendants in the UK. However, when the attendant is married, or is a mature woman, the term 'matron of honour' is often used. The influence of American English has led to the chief bridesmaid sometimes being called the maid of honour.

In North America, a wedding party might include several bridesmaids, but the 'maid of honor' is the title and position held by the bride's chief attendant, typically her closest friend or sister. In modern-day weddings, some brides opt to choose a long-time male friend or brother as their head attendant, using the title 'best man' or 'man of honor'.

The activities of the principal bridesmaid may be as many or as varied as she allows the bride to impose upon her. Her only required duty is to participate in the wedding ceremony. Typically, however, she is asked for help with the logistics of the wedding as an event, such as addressing invitations, and for her help as a friend, such as attending the bride as she shops for her wedding dress.

Aside from being the bride's right hand, the maid of honor is responsible for leading the rest of the bridal party through the planning of any pre-wedding events. For example, the principal bridesmaid will be the one to make the arrangements for the bridal shower, including invitations, decorations, food, and any games or activities that will be played. She will also be in charge of planning the bachelorette party, including any travel or lodging accommodations that must be arranged.

On the day of the wedding, her principal duty is to provide practical and emotional support. She might assist the bride with dressing and, if needed, help the bride manage her veil, a bouquet, a prayer book, or the train of her wedding dress during the day. In a double-ring wedding, the chief bridesmaid is often entrusted with the groom's wedding ring until it is needed during the ceremony. Many brides ask bridesmaids if they are adults, to be legal witnesses who sign the marriage license after the ceremony. If there is a reception after the wedding, the maid of honor may be asked to offer a toast to the newlywed.

== Origin and history ==
The origin of the Western bridesmaid tradition likely arose from a combination of many factors. The most-likely factors include, but are not limited to, socioeconomic class and status, family size, socialization standards of the day, and religion.

The Book of Genesis (29:24, 29) describes Leah and Rachel each being accompanied by their own handmaidens when they married Jacob, a passage some historians consider an early precursor to the bridesmaid tradition. These women were handmaidens (servants or slaves) rather than social peers.

In ancient times, originally the bride and all the bridesmaids wore exactly the same dress and veiled their faces heavily, for the purpose of confusing jealous suitors and evil spirits.

In China during the feudal era, brides were susceptible to kidnapping at weddings by rival clans and hooligans. Shouldering the responsibility to protect the bride, bridesmaids were dressed up like the bride to lower the risk that she might be identified and taken. As legal protections for marriage were established, this was no longer necessary, and the role of bridesmaid took a more symbolic turn.

In the Victorian era, white was the official color for both male groomsmen and female bridesmaids. This trend originated with Queen Victoria when she married Prince Albert wearing a long white wedding dress, and her bridesmaids matched the color of her gown.

== See also ==
- Bridesman
