= Vőfély =

Master of Ceremonies of a traditional wedding in Hungary

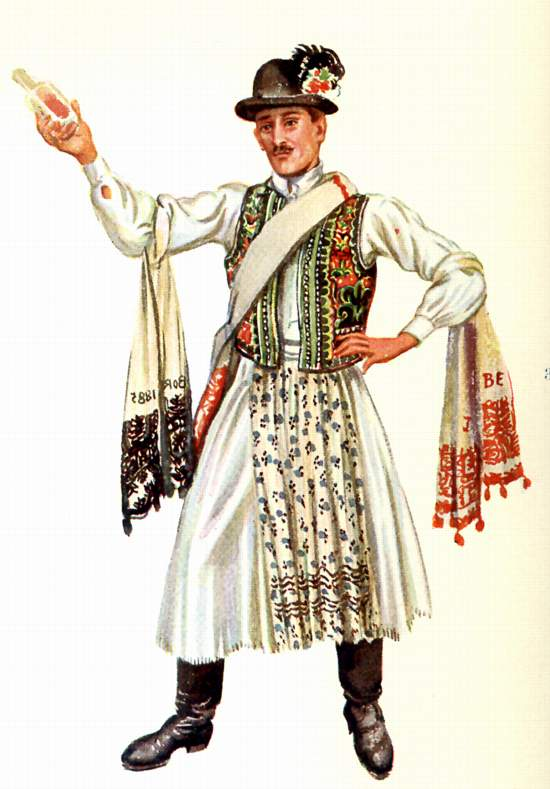
A vőfély in traditional costume, c. 1885

A vőfély is the Master of Ceremonies before, during and after a traditional wedding in Hungary. He wears a ribboned hat so he can be easily identified.

== Role ==
The vőfély is a man (or sometimes these days a woman) who roughly takes the role of the best man, but has many more duties. He is the official host, organizer, coordinator, entertainer and Master of Ceremonies during the wedding. A vőfély can be a relative but more often he is an experienced professional hired by the families.

The vőfély performs many of his roles partly by reciting comic verse which is based on well-known traditional forms but tailored to the individuals being married, and their families.

== Before the wedding ==
Traditionally well before the wedding the vőfély helps to arrange the marriage, discusses the details with the families and gets the parents' approvals.

On the day of the wedding the vőfély says goodbye to the parents in the name of the bridegroom at the groom's house and escorts the groom and his family to the bride's house. The vőfély recites comic verse and keeps the guests informed and looks after them to make sure they get enough drinks and food. At the bride's house the vőfély asks for the bride (sometimes the parents pretend that they would not give her away, and the vőfély plays their game by begging or even threatening them, tongue-in-cheek). After the parents "give up" the vőfély says goodbye in the name of the bride.

== At the wedding ceremonies ==
The vőfély then leads the two united families to the church and to the civil ceremony. (Note: In Hungary, as in many other countries, the religious ceremony does not make the couple married in law, which is done some time soon before or after at a civil ceremony. In English law, the marriage service itself is enough if it is done in the established church, or in a synagogue (but not in a mosque or for other religions. Scots law differs, and in US law it varies from state to state.) The wedding march is often accompanied by a live band playing traditional folk music. The vőfély guides the couple and manages the guests, for example he announces when it is time to congratulate them.

== After the wedding ceremonies ==
Before the wedding breakfast the vőfély makes a speech then introduces the meals by describing them in comic poems.

During the wedding party the vőfély helps the mood by having the guests play games. While the guests are dancing, the vőfély coordinates the waiters, the photographer, the cameraman and the band in the background to prepare everyone for the next event.

=== Presenting the cake ===
The vőfély recites part of a comic poem before presenting the wedding cake.

=== Giving gifts ===
At midnight, the vőfély says "the bride is for sale", which means the guests can have a short dance with the bride in exchange for wedding presents or some money (usually in envelopes). The vőfély acts as an auctioneer and helps to "sell" the bride (and sometimes the groom as well). This is the first "collective wealth" they get as a married couple.

The guests may start throwing coins at them and when the "money sweeping" starts, as they grab the coins from the floor, they kick the coins around making them harder to retrieve, thus representing the joint housework and simulating the ups and downs in life. In some regions this tradition is so popular that some guests bring large numbers of coins. No-one is allowed to stop the money sweeping, but the vőfély can help by asking the guests after some time that they can help the pair instead of giving them a hard time.

At midnight the pair leaves the guests for a few minutes, taking their money and presents. They change out of their formal wedding outfits, and return to the dancing. Sometimes the wedding party goes on all night and the remaining guests escort the pair home in the morning.
