= The Bash (company) =

American event services booking platform

- Company type: Internet
- Founded: 1997; 29 years ago
- Headquarters: Norwalk, Connecticut, United States
- Key people: Michael Caldwell, CEO; Kevin Kinyon, President
- Website: thebash.com

The Bash (formerly GigMasters) is an event services booking platform. Its headquarters are in South Norwalk, Connecticut, U.S. The Bash matches entertainers with planners of weddings, dances, parties, festivals, celebrations, and corporate events.

== History ==
GigMasters was founded in 1997 by entrepreneurs Michael Caldwell and Kevin Kinyon who were based near New York. The company launched the first version of its website in February 1997. In September 2010, GigMasters raised $200,000 in expansion funding from investor James Marciano.

In 2013, about half of the company's bookings were wedding-related. In November 2013, the company raised $1.3 million in series A funding by XO Group, parent company of TheKnot.com. Kristin Savilia, XO Group's Executive Vice President, joined GigMasters' board of directors.

In September 2014, Inc. Magazine ranked GigMasters as one of the nation's 5000 fastest growing private companies.

In October, 2015, the Caldwell and Kinyon, creators of GigMasters, sold the company for $8.5 million to XO Group.

In June 2018, GigMasters launched The Bash in New York City to test a one-stop party planning platform. The team learned a lot and validated findings around a complete booking experience while learning that the brand name ‘The Bash’ resonated well with party planners.

In July 2019, The Bash was expanded nationwide by merging it with GigMasters, and rebranded the combined site as The Bash (www.thebash.com).

In January 2020, The Bash launched venues in New York and Los Angeles and began removing references to GigMasters across the site.

In April, 2020, The Bash launched venues in Chicago and other major markets, revealed an official new logo, a redesigned navigation and footer, and color updates to the site to reflect the new brand style.

== Features ==
The Bash sorts entries by instrument and by event or service type. Musicians create profiles and describe their services. Potential customers can enter their location and search for the service they need.
