= Wedding invitation =

Letter to attend a wedding

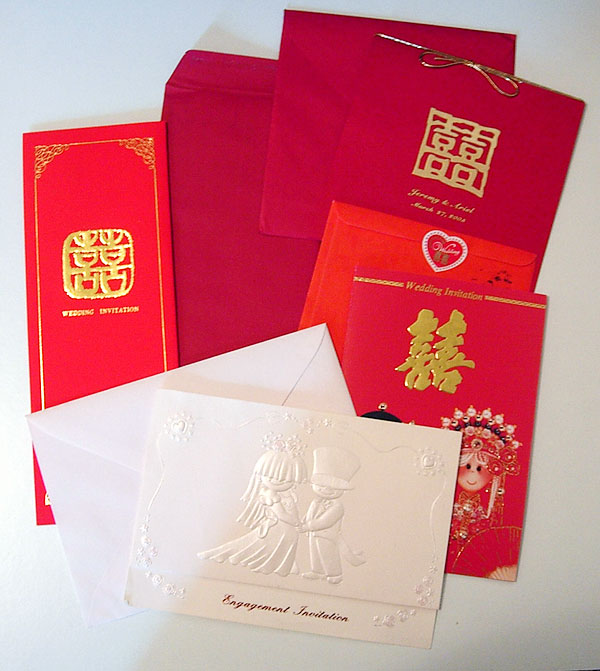
Mix of wedding invitations of Chinese and western styles

A wedding invitation is a letter asking the recipient to attend a wedding. It is typically written in the formal, third-person language and mailed five to eight weeks before the wedding date.

Like any other invitation, it is the privilege and duty of the host—historically, for younger brides in Western culture, the mother of the bride, on behalf of the bride's family—to issue invitations, either by sending them herself or causing them to be sent, either by enlisting the help of relatives, friends, or her social secretary to select the guest list and address envelopes, or by hiring a service. With computer technology, some are able to print directly on envelopes from a guest list using a mail merge with word processing and spreadsheet software.

== History ==
=== The Middle Ages and before ===
Prior to the invention of the moveable-type printing press by Johannes Gutenberg in 1447, weddings in England were typically announced by means of a Town crier: a man who would walk through the streets announcing in a loud voice the news of the day. Traditionally, anyone within earshot became part of the celebration.

In the Middle Ages, illiteracy was widespread among common people, so the practice of sending written wedding invitations emerged among the nobility. Families of means would commission monks, skilled in the art of calligraphy, to hand-craft their notices.

Such documents often carried the coat of arms, or personal crest, of the individual and were sealed with wax.

=== From 1600 onward ===
Despite the emergence of the printing press, the ordinary printing techniques of the time, in which ink was simply stamped onto the paper using lead type, produced too poor a result for stylish invitations. However, the tradition of announcing weddings in the newspaper did become established at this time.

In 1642, the invention of metal-plate engraving (or mezzotint) by Ludwig von Siegen brought higher-quality wedding invitations within the reach of the emerging middle class. Engraving, as the name implies, requires an artisan to "hand write" the text in reverse onto a metal plate using a carving tool, and the plate was then used to print the invitation. The resulting engraved invitations were protected from smudging by a sheet of tissue paper placed on top, which is a tradition that remains to this day.

At the time, the wording of wedding invitations was more elaborate than today; typically, the name of each guest was individually printed on the invitation.

=== The Industrial Revolution ===
Following the invention of lithography by Alois Senefelder in 1798, it became possible to produce very sharp and distinctive inking without the need for engraving. This paved the way for the emergence of a genuine mass-market in wedding invitations.

Wedding invitations were still delivered by hand and on horseback, however, due to the unreliability of the nascent postal system. A ‘double envelope’ was used to protect the invitation from damage en route to its recipient. This tradition remains today, despite advances in postal reliability.

=== Modern times ===
The origins of commercially printed "fine wedding stationery" can be traced to just after World War II, when a combination of democracy and rapid industrial growth allowed ordinary people to mimic the lifestyles and materialism of society's elite. About that time, prominent society figures, such as Amy Vanderbilt and Emily Post, emerged to advise the ordinary man and woman on appropriate etiquette.

Growth in the use of wedding stationery was also underpinned by the development of thermography. Although it lacks the fineness and distinctiveness of engraving, thermography is a less expensive method of achieving raised type. This technique, often called poor man's engraving, produces shiny, raised lettering without impressing the surface of the paper (in the way traditional engraving does). As such, wedding invitations – either printed or engraved – finally became affordable for all.

More recently letterpress printing has become popular for wedding invitations. It has a certain boutique and craft appeal due to the deep impression or bite that can be achieved. It was not the original intent of letterpress to bite into the paper in this way, but rather to kiss it, creating a flat print. The bite or deep impression is a recent aesthetic that adds the sensory experience of touch to letterpress printed wedding invitations. Many letterpress printers that specialize in wedding invitations are small start-ups or artisan printers, rather than large printing companies.

Laser engraving has also been making headway in the wedding invitation market over the last few years. Primarily used for engraving wood veneer invitations, it is also used to engrave acrylic or to mark certain types of metal invitations.

The latest trend in wedding invitations is to order them online. Using the internet has made viewing, organizing and ordering wedding invitations an easy task. There are hundreds of websites that offer wedding invitations and stationery, and being online allows the customer to order from anywhere in the world.

== Text ==
Etiquette regarding the text on a formal wedding invitation varies according to country, culture and language. In Western countries, a formal invitation is typically written in the formal, third-person language, saying that the hosts wish for the recipient to attend the wedding and giving its date, time, and place. In some non-Western countries, such as India, where the concept of wedding invitations was acquired through the British, the language continues to follow Western traditions.

As the bride's parents are traditionally the hosts of the wedding, the text commonly begins with the names of the bride's parents as they use them in formal social contexts, e.g., "Mr. and Mrs. John A Smith" or "Dr. Mary Jones and Mr. John Smith". The exact wording varies, but a typical phrasing runs as follows:

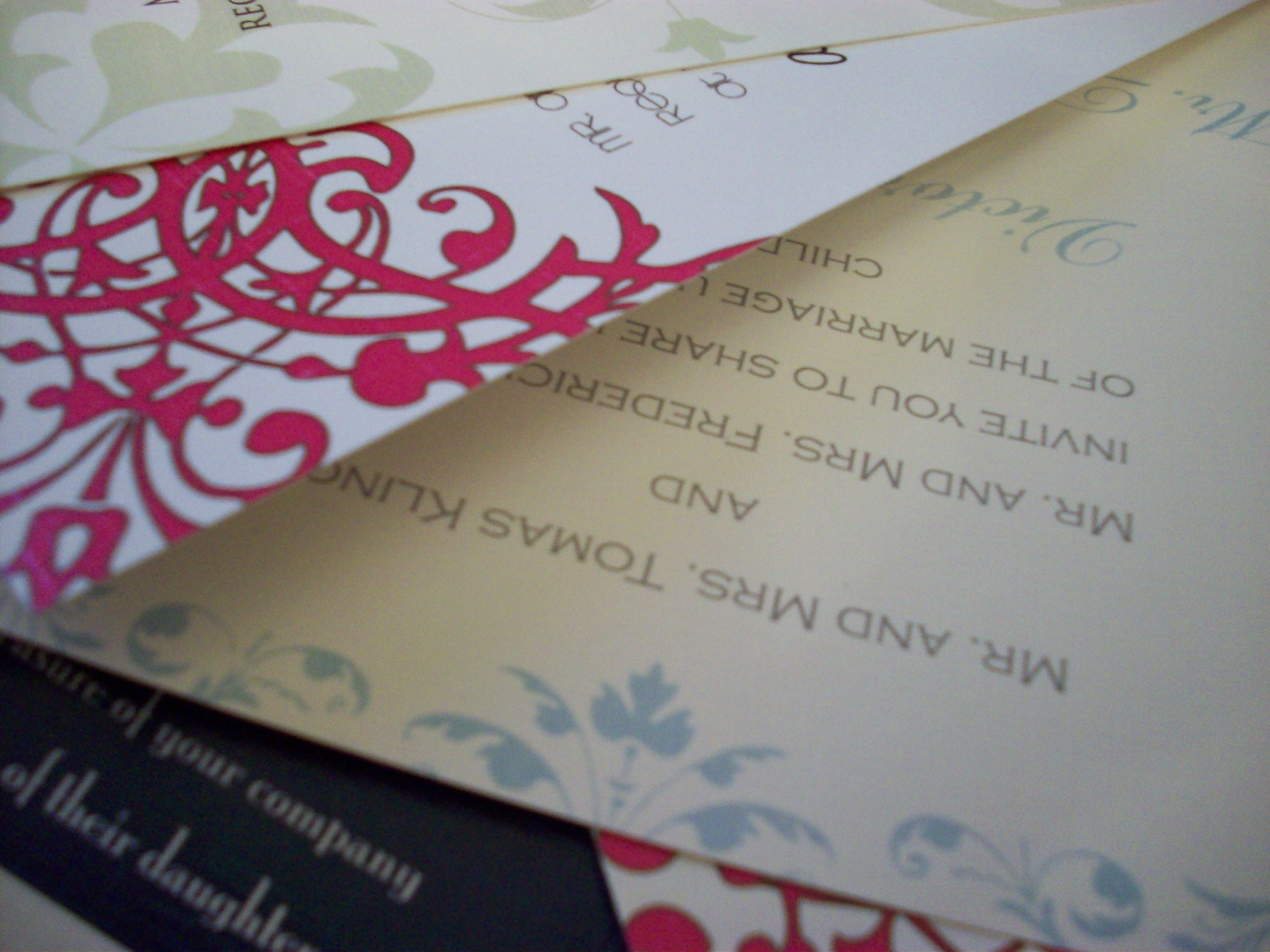
A modern wedding invitation

Mr. and Mrs. John A Smith
request the honor of your presence
at the wedding of their daughter
Jessica Marie
to
Mr. Michael Francis Miller
on the first of November
at twelve noon
Christchurch Hall
Richmond, Virginia

Wedding invitations sometimes include the spelling 'honour,' even in the United States, where the 'u' is not correct in any other context regardless of formality. This practice derives from a ruling laid down by Emily Post in the 1920s.

In the United Kingdom, the line "request...presence" is used when the ceremony is held in a house of worship; "pleasure of your company" is used when it is held elsewhere.

If the groom's parents are also hosts of the wedding, then their names may be added as well. If the parents are not the hosts of the wedding, then the host's name is substituted in the first line, or, especially if the bride and groom are themselves the hosts, it may be written in the passive voice: "The honour of your presence is requested at the wedding of..."

Formal announcements, sent after the wedding ceremony, omit the time and sometimes the place, but usually retain the same general form.

Informal invitations, appropriate to less formal weddings, are issued by word of mouth or by hand-written letter. So long as they convey the necessary practical information about the time and place, there is no set form for these invitations.

A wedding invitation service specializing in custom-designed invitations for a variety of cultural traditions, including Urdu, Islamic, and modern styles. The company offers personalized printing options, a wide range of design templates, and international shipping to accommodate weddings worldwide

== Printing and design ==
Commercial wedding invitations are typically printed using one of the following methods: engraving, lithography, thermography, letterpress printing, sometimes blind embossing, compression plate process, or offset printing. More recently, many brides are printing on their home computers using a laser printer or inkjet printer. For the artistically inclined, they can be handmade or written in calligraphy.

Historically, wedding invitations were hand-written unless the length of the guest list made this impractical. When mass-production was necessary, engraving was preferred over the only other widely available then option, which was a relatively poor quality of letterpress printing. Hand-written invitations, in the hosts' own handwriting, are still considered most correct whenever feasible; these invitations follow the same formal third-person form as printed ones for formal weddings and take the form of a personal letter for less formal weddings. Tissues are often provided by manufacturers to place over the printed text. Originally, the purpose of the tissue was to reduce smudging or blotting, especially on invitations poorly printed or hastily mailed before the ink was fully dried, but improved printing techniques mean they are now simply decorative. Those who know that their original purpose has been made irrelevant by dramatic improvements in printing technology usually discard them.

Modern invitation design follows fashion trends. Invitations are generally chosen to match the couple's personal preferences, the level of formality of the event, and any color scheme or planned theme. For example, a casual beach wedding may have light, fresh colors and beach-related graphics. A formal church wedding may have more scripty typefaces and lots of ornamentation that matches the formal nature of the event. The design of the invitation is becoming less and less traditional and more reflective of the couple's personality. Some web-based print-on-demand companies now allow couples to design or customize their own wedding invitations.

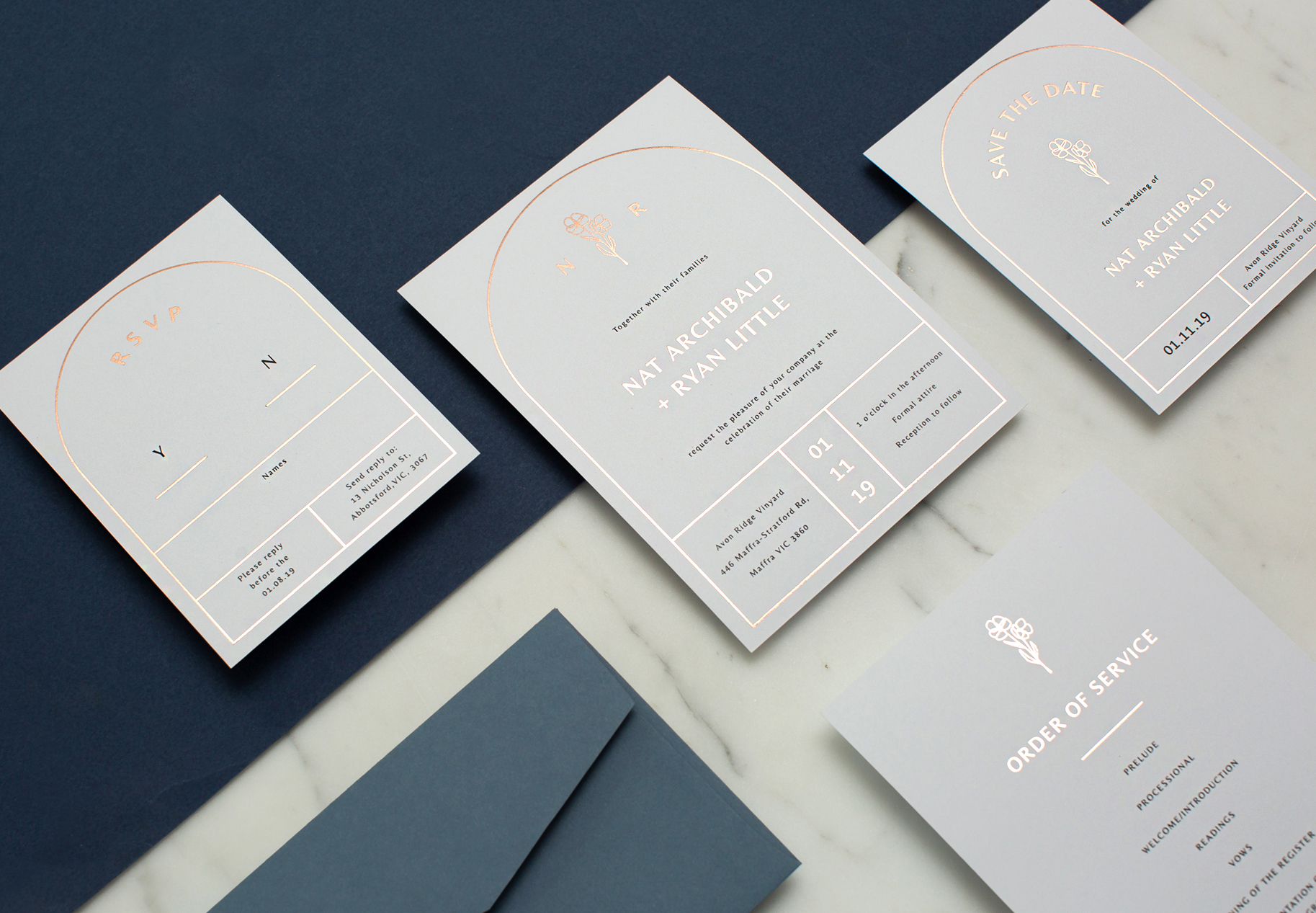
An example of a foil modern wedding invitation

More recently in 2019, foil stamping and foil sleeking invitations have come back into trend. Foil sleeking is applied by applying a thick layer of toner to a paper using all four CMYK colours and a fifth white colour, next the card is fed through a foil heat transfer machine where the foil sticks to the toner and design.

The invitation is typically a note card, folded in half, or perhaps French folded (folded twice, into quarters). Other options include a sheet of paper, a tri-fold, or a trendy pocket-fold design. The appropriate paper density depends on the design but typically ranges from heavy paper to very stiff card stock. There are also acrylic invitations.

== Mailing ==
Traditionally, wedding invitations are mailed in double envelopes. The inner envelope may be lined, is not gummed, and fits into the outer envelope. The outer envelope is gummed for sealing and addressing. More recently, the inner envelope is often left out in the interest of saving money, paper, and postage. In some cases, a pocketfold takes the place of an inner envelope.

In countries that issue them, the envelope may be franked with love stamps. The United States postal service issues a love stamp each year specifically denominated to cover the double weight of the invitation and reply (a rate slightly less than the cost of two regular stamps).

== Response ==
As with any invitation, the sole obligation of the recipient person is to respond, as promptly as reasonably possible, to let the hosts know whether or not he will be able to attend. Receiving a wedding invitation does not obligate the recipient either to attend the wedding or to send a gift.

A proper response is written on the recipient's normal stationery, following the form of the invitation. For example, if the invitation uses formal, third-person language, then the recipient replies in formal, third-person language, saying either "Mr. Robert Jones accepts with pleasure the kind invitation to the wedding on the first of November", or "Ms. Susan Brown regrets that she is unable to attend the wedding on the first of November."

Pre-printed, pre-addressed, pre-stamped response cards are frequently sent in the hope of encouraging a greater proportion of invited people to respond to the invitation. Some American etiquette experts consider the practice incorrect and ineffective at increasing response rates.

== Other items ==
In addition to the invitation itself, sellers promote a wide range of optional printed materials. These may include an RSVP response card, a separate invitation to a wedding reception, and information such as maps, directions, childcare options, and hotel accommodations.

Wedding invitations should be sent out 6–8 weeks prior to a wedding, with slightly more time being given for out of town or destination weddings. Guests should be asked to reply at least 2 to 3 weeks before the wedding date; although many couples request RSVPs to be returned up to a month prior to the wedding day.

These printers also sell matching pieces intended for the day of the wedding, such as programs, menus, table cards, and place cards, as well as wedding favors and party favors such as napkins, coasters, cocktail stirrers and matchboxes.

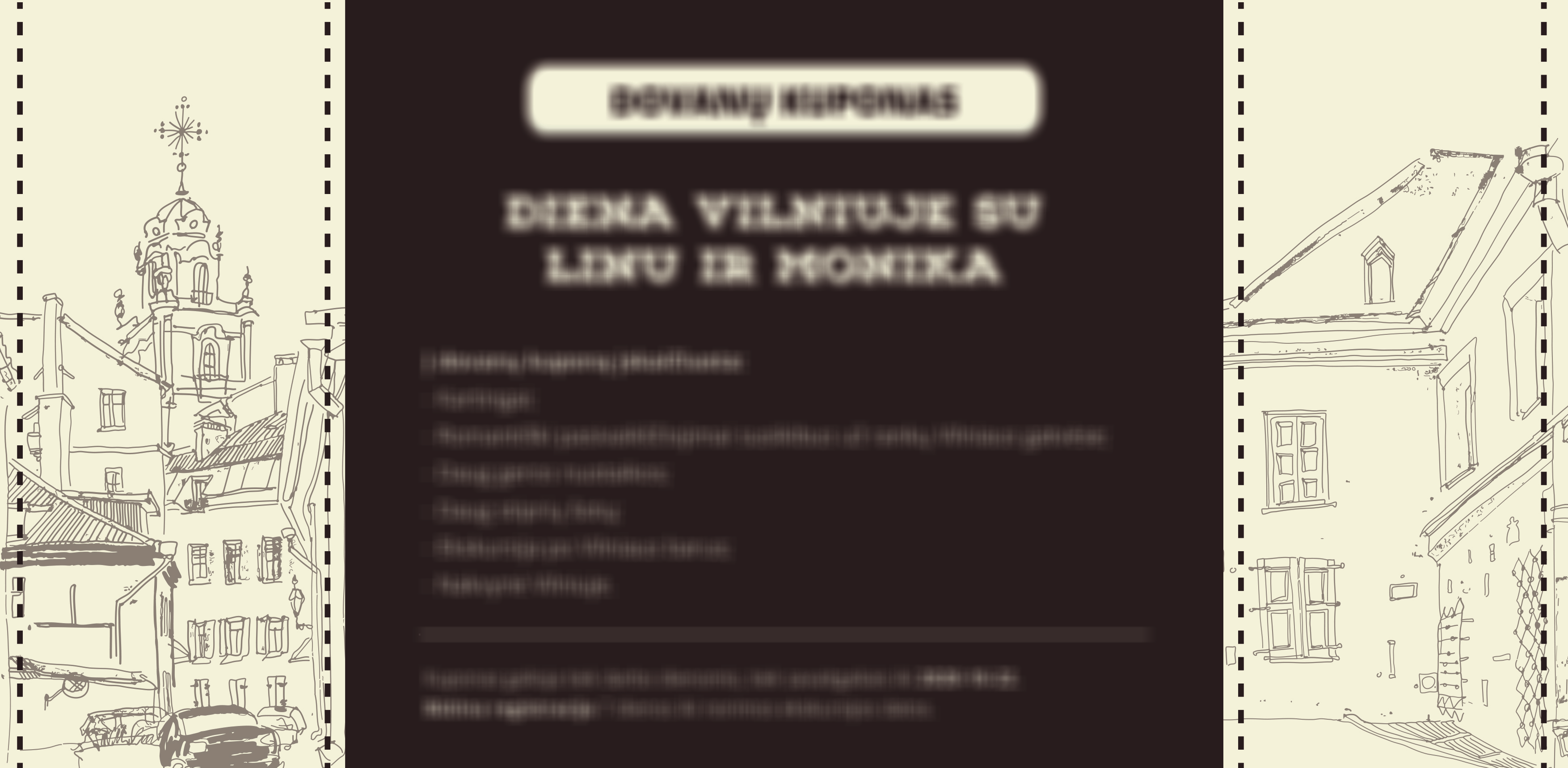

== In pop culture ==
In "The Invitations" episode of Seinfeld, George Costanza's fiancée Susan is killed by licking toxic wedding invitations that George picked out because they were inexpensive.

== See also ==
- Indian wedding invitations
- Baby announcement
- Personal wedding website
- Monogram
- Wedding crashing
