= Wedding industry in the United States =

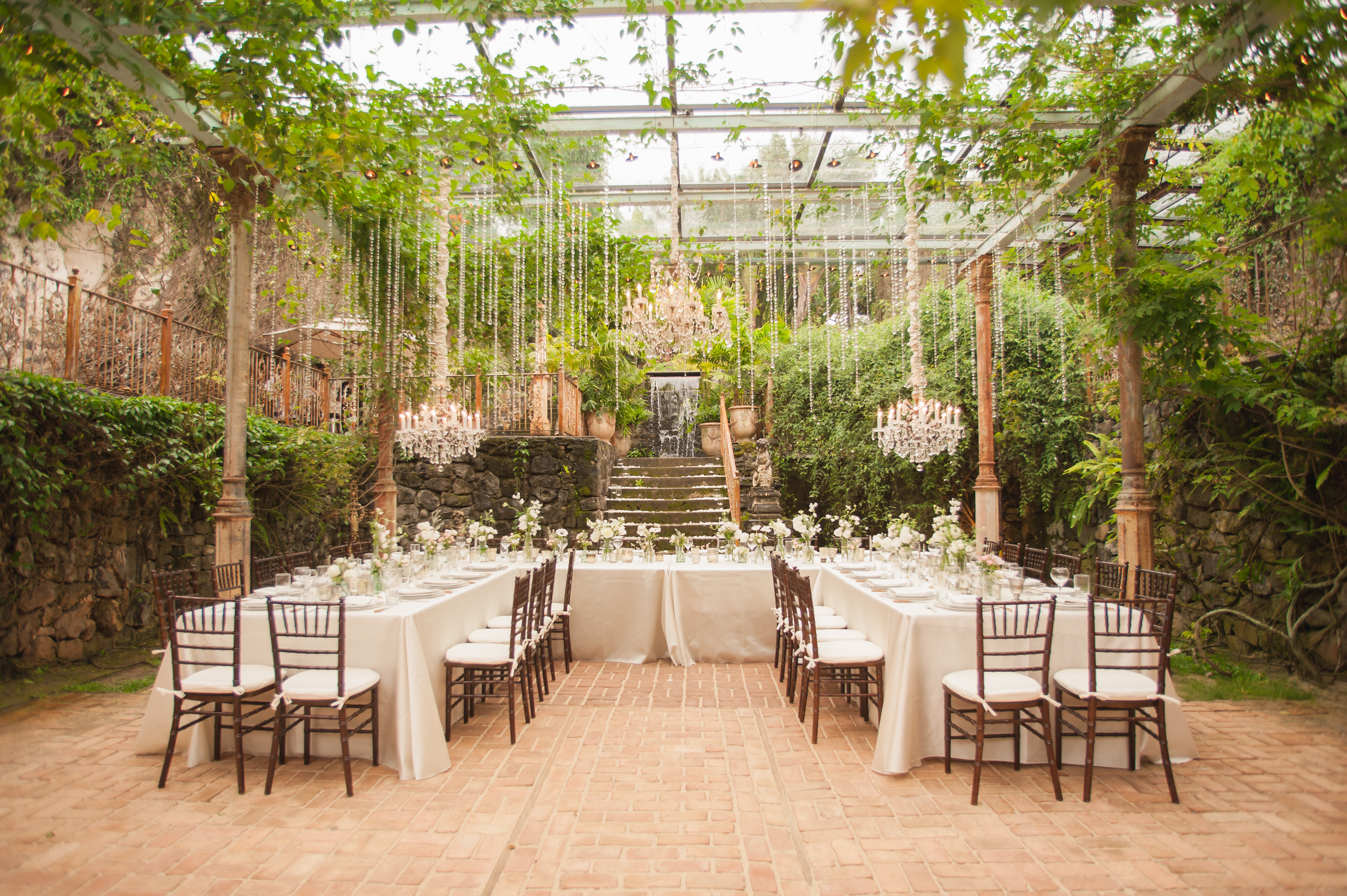
Elaborate wedding reception area and decorations in Maui (2014)

The wedding industry in the United States is the providers of services and goods for weddings in the U.S., taken as a whole. Every year in the United States, there are approximately 2.5 million weddings. The United States wedding industry was estimated to be worth about $70.5 billion as of 2022.

The wedding industry in the United States has cultural and social elements and has become an economic giant. Some elements of the wedding process generate major revenue for many major corporations each year. This includes clothes, flowers, music, and many other elements that are a part of the ceremony, reception, honeymoon, and bachelor and bachelorette parties.

== History ==
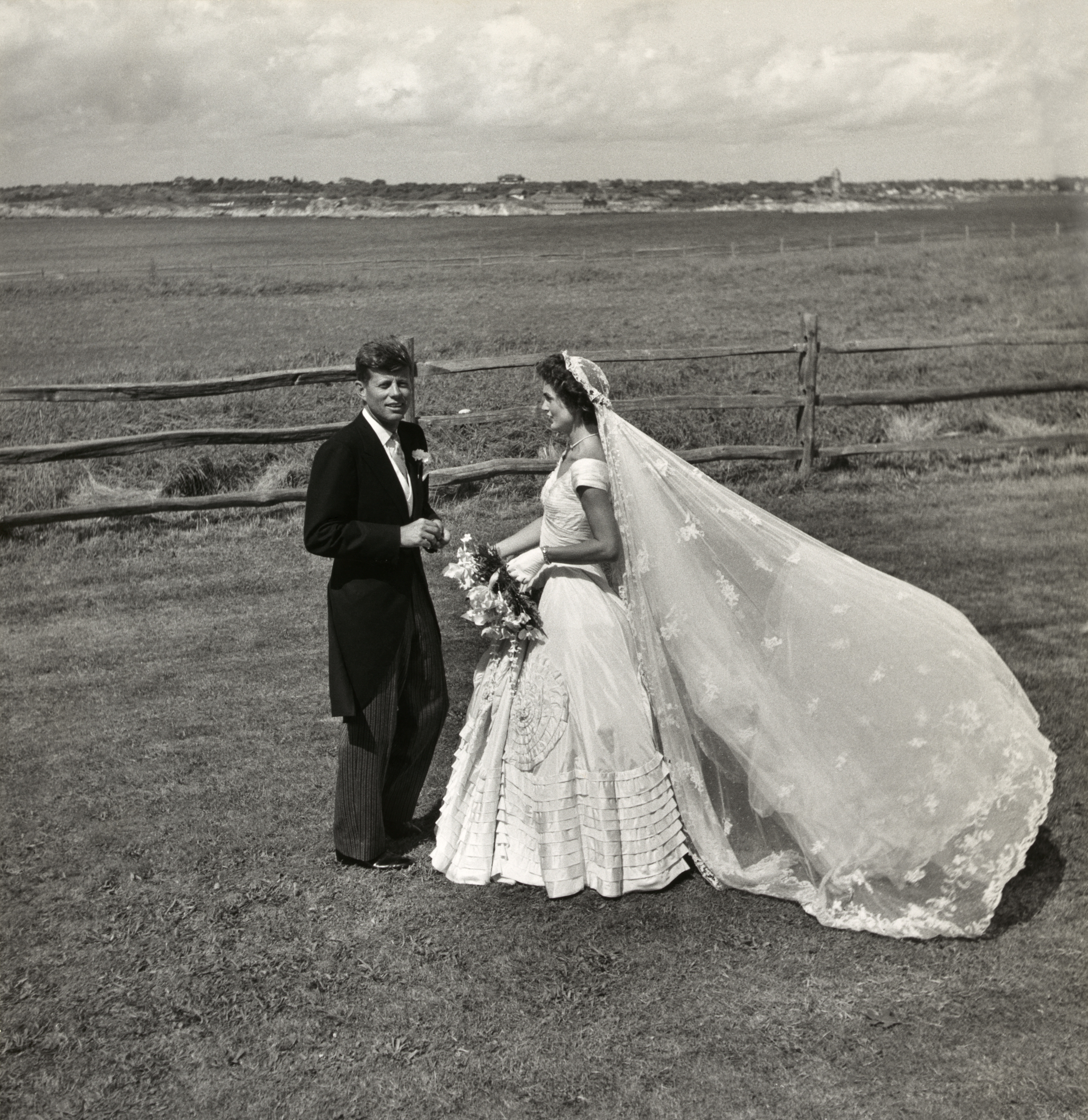
Future American President John F. Kennedy and his bride Jackie in a kind of pose and setting still emulated today. Photo by Toni Frissell (1953)

The wedding industry is a modern phenomenon. The wedding industry changed and evolved into a capitalist industry that we know today between the 1920s to 1950s, and many American practices that are now considered traditional were developed during this time by advertisements and promotions from major retailers, jewelers, caterers, and many other companies.

In the 1960s and 1970s brides started to deviate from the original wedding plan, and moved the wedding outside of the church. This developed the idea of the "destination wedding", and is still very popular today.

== Overall costs ==
As of 2012, the median cost of a wedding, including both the ceremony and reception, but not the honeymoon, in the United States, was about US$18,000 per wedding, according to a large survey at an online wedding website. Regional differences are significant, with residents of Manhattan paying more than three times the median, while residents of Alaska spent less than half as much. Additionally, the survey probably overestimates the typical cost because of a biased sample population.

In 2019, the average cost of a wedding in the United States, not including the honeymoon, was $25,000 – an overall decrease compared to studies done in previous years. According to researchers, this dip in cost is likely due to a decrease in formal or black tie weddings, and an increase in "nontraditional locations". Costs also declined during and after the COVID-19 pandemic, as restrictions on large gatherings promoted virtual events, microweddings, and lower-cost or free venues such as their own homes or backyards.

The more widely reported mean cost in this survey was significantly higher, with a mean of over $28,000. Most people in this survey spent at least $10,000 less than the median amount. The difference of $10,000 per wedding is due entirely to very high spending by a small number of very wealthy couples – the couples most likely to pay for more services from the wedding industry. The mean cost is useful for professionals and salespeople in the wedding industry, as it helps them understand the budgets of people who are spending the most, rather than for the typical person. It may also encourage overspending by their clients, since they can point to the higher mean as being the "average" cost, even though it is much higher than what most couples actually spend.

According to studies done throughout the United Kingdom that are often related back to United States wedding trends, wedding costs are often significantly higher because of the wedding industry itself. Their research found that DJ's, photographers, and florists routinely charge more money for services related to a wedding than those for a party of the same size.

== Wedding insurance ==
A couple may purchase wedding insurance to cover unexpected financial losses related to their wedding, for instance loss or damage to the wedding dress or tuxedo. Other things potentially covered by wedding insurance include lost deposits as a result of vendor bankruptcy, cancellation due to illness, injury, military service or extreme weather and third-party or liquor liability claims. depending on the level of cover required. Problems a couple knew about before taking out the policy are not covered and almost all insurers will not cover cancellations that are due to "cold feet". Currently, only one company does and it can only be purchased by the person who finances the wedding, not the Bride or Groom, and only applies if the wedding is cancelled more than 180 days before. Wedding insurance is becoming increasingly popular in other countries, including Australia, New Zealand and the UK. The UK is very different with quite a few big name providers.

== Cost by area ==
=== Bachelor and bachelorette parties ===
Costs of bachelor and bachelorette parties depend upon what the party entails. If the party is held in someone's home, then it may cost no more than any other dinner party. A multi-day event held out of town, however, can cost hundreds or even thousands of dollars per person, like any other vacation trip.

=== Wedding ceremony ===
This money may go towards things such as renting a venue, flowers and other decorations, the officiant, the wedding planner, and invitations to the event, as well as music played before and during the ceremony.

For wedding invitations, couples spent in 2009, on average, about US$848, which includes costs of stationery accessories ($188) and printed, pre-made invitations or reply cards ($659).

A wedding band or singer may cost at least $1,000 depending on who performs, and this cost can be for either the ceremony or the reception. A professional wedding planner may charge about $25 per hour or $3,000 total.

=== Clothing and accessories ===
==== Clothing ====
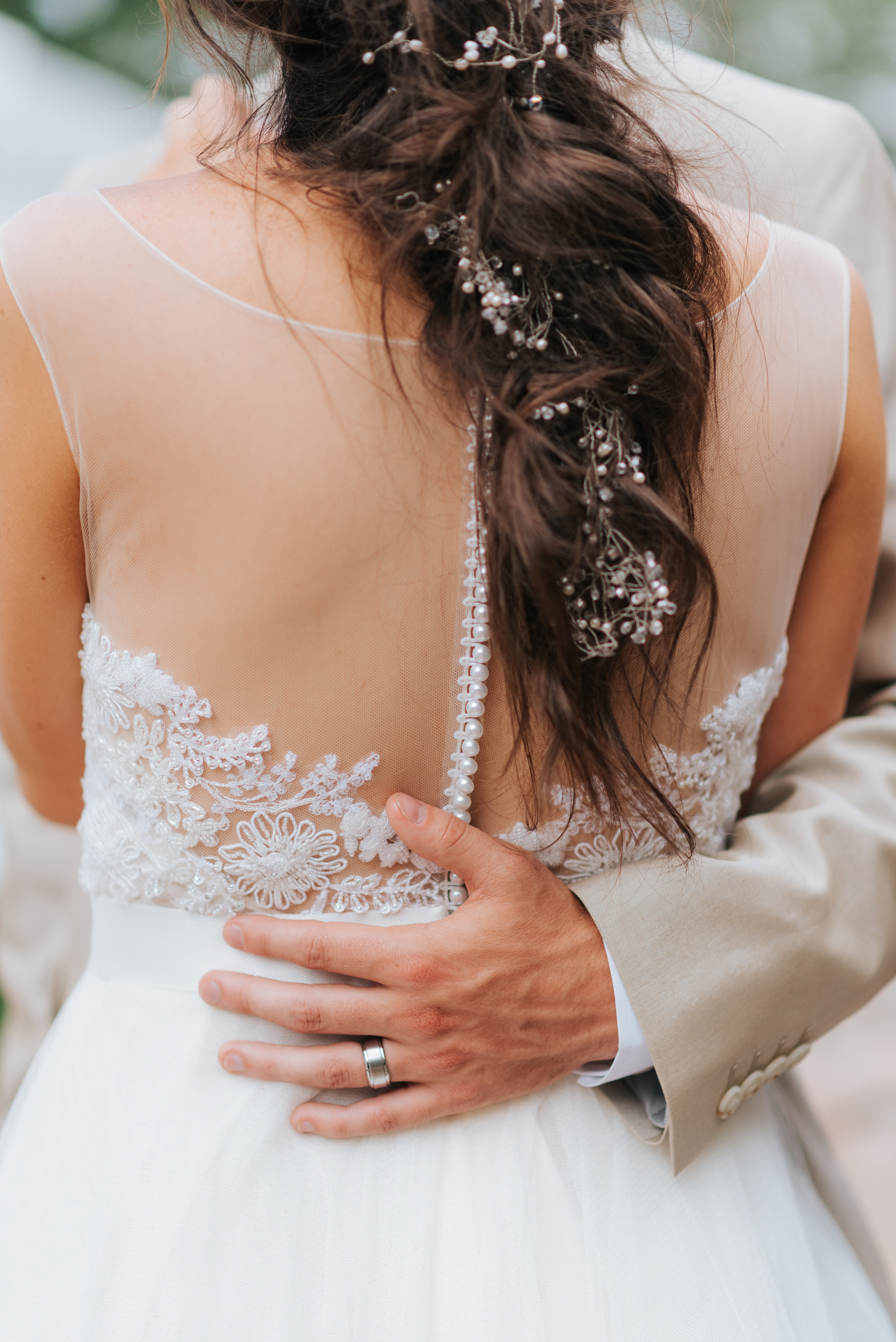
In 2013, the average wedding dress cost US$1,211

In the United States in 2013, the average wedding dress cost $1,211.

Television series like TLC's "Say Yes to The Dress" which features bridal boutique, Kleinfeld's, show the workings of the bridal gown industry. The bridal gown industry relies mainly on bridal magazines for advertising.

As for the groom, the cost of his clothes and accessories is considerably less than the bride, with the average cost coming to about $313.

==== Wedding jewelry and rings ====
Since the early 1930s, when the DeBeers diamond company began some of the earliest marketing campaigns for diamond rings, wedding rings have been closely associated with long, successful marriages. In 2006, many couples spent just over $2,000 for his and hers wedding bands. In 2008, despite the start of a recession, the price spent on the average engagement ring increased to $5,861. In 2012, Americans spent about $7 billion on diamond rings. The bride may additionally spend a few hundred dollars on a necklace or other jewelry to wear with her wedding dress. Even in times of economic hardship, couples rarely skimp on the jewelry. This boosts sales for the jewelry industry as wedding jewelry is part of a larger industry.

==== Wedding accessories ====
Some brides follow the "old-fashioned" custom(s) of "something old, something new, something borrowed, and something blue". Other accessories include tiaras, veils, flower bouquets, jewelry, cosmetics, and dress shoes.

=== Wedding reception ===
The size and grandeur of a wedding reception can be an indicator of a couple's social status or the one they would like to portray. The number of guests, quality of the food and drinks, location, and who plays the music can all symbolize the wealth and presumed status of the newly weds. The reception can be an opportunity to flaunt wealth and impress guests (friends and family). This can lead to couples or parents spending an excessive amount of money and even putting themselves into debt to pay for the wedding. Celebrities like Donald Trump and his wife Melania Knauss spent an approximated amount of US$1 million on their wedding. The reception consisted of 400 guests, was serenaded by a full orchestra, and was catered by chef Jean-Georges Vongerichten. But this is nothing compared to Liza Minnelli and David Gest's wedding that was estimated at 3.5 million dollars, and then the couple divorced the next year.

Approximately 28 percent of the wedding budget is spent on the reception, which makes it the most expensive part of the wedding.

== Honeymoon ==
The honeymoon industry is a $12 billion industry annually. On average, about 10 percent of newlyweds book cruises as their honeymoon trip; 37 percent travel to domestic locations, while 63 percent go abroad; lastly, 40 percent stay at a resort, while 27 percent stay at a large hotel, while 10 percent look into a small hotel. On average, 75% of newlyweds travel on their honeymoon within the first week of marriage. 62% of couples pay for their own honeymoon, while the remainder receives a trip as a wedding gift. The average couple books their honeymoon 8 weeks after getting engaged and spend over 5 weeks planning their trip.

=== Leisure activities ===
Other than romance, couples often choose to engage in outdoor activities to enhance their honeymoon experience. The top five activities are listed below:
Visiting a new place for sightseeing, restaurants, entertainment and nightlife- 75%
Beaches and lakes – 45%
Casinos – 20%
Cruises – 15%
Golf/sports vacations – 10

== Wedding journalism ==
Wedding magazines, wedding blogs, and their associated social media accounts (such as Instagram, Facebook, Pinterest, and Snapchat) play an important role in the wedding industry. They showcase and drive current trends, and serve as a useful way for couples to discover vendors and ideas.

=== Wedding Magazines ===
- Brides
- Martha Stewart Weddings
