= Groomsman =

Participant in Western wedding ceremonies

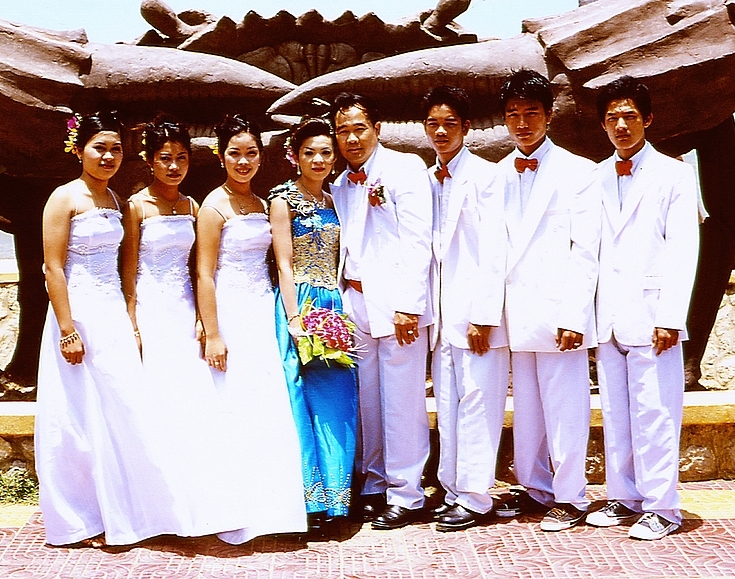
Three groomsmen stand to the left of the groom and three bridesmaids stand to the right of the bride in this wedding in Kep, Cambodia.

A groomsmen or usher is one of the male attendants to the groom in a wedding ceremony. Usually, the groom selects close friends and relatives to serve as groomsmen, and it is considered an honor to be selected. From his groomsmen, the groom usually chooses one to serve as a best man.

For a wedding with many guests, the groom may also ask other male friends and relatives to act as ushers without otherwise participating in the wedding ceremony; their sole task is ushering guests to their seats before the ceremony. Ushers may also be hired for very large weddings.

In a military officer's wedding, the roles of groomsmen are replaced by swordsmen of the sword honor guard. They are usually picked as close personal friends of the groom who have served with him. Their role includes forming the traditional saber arch for the married couple and guests to walk through.

According to the Oxford English Dictionary, the word groomsman is first attested at least as early as 1698, although the words bride and groom both have origins dating back to Old English.

== Duties ==
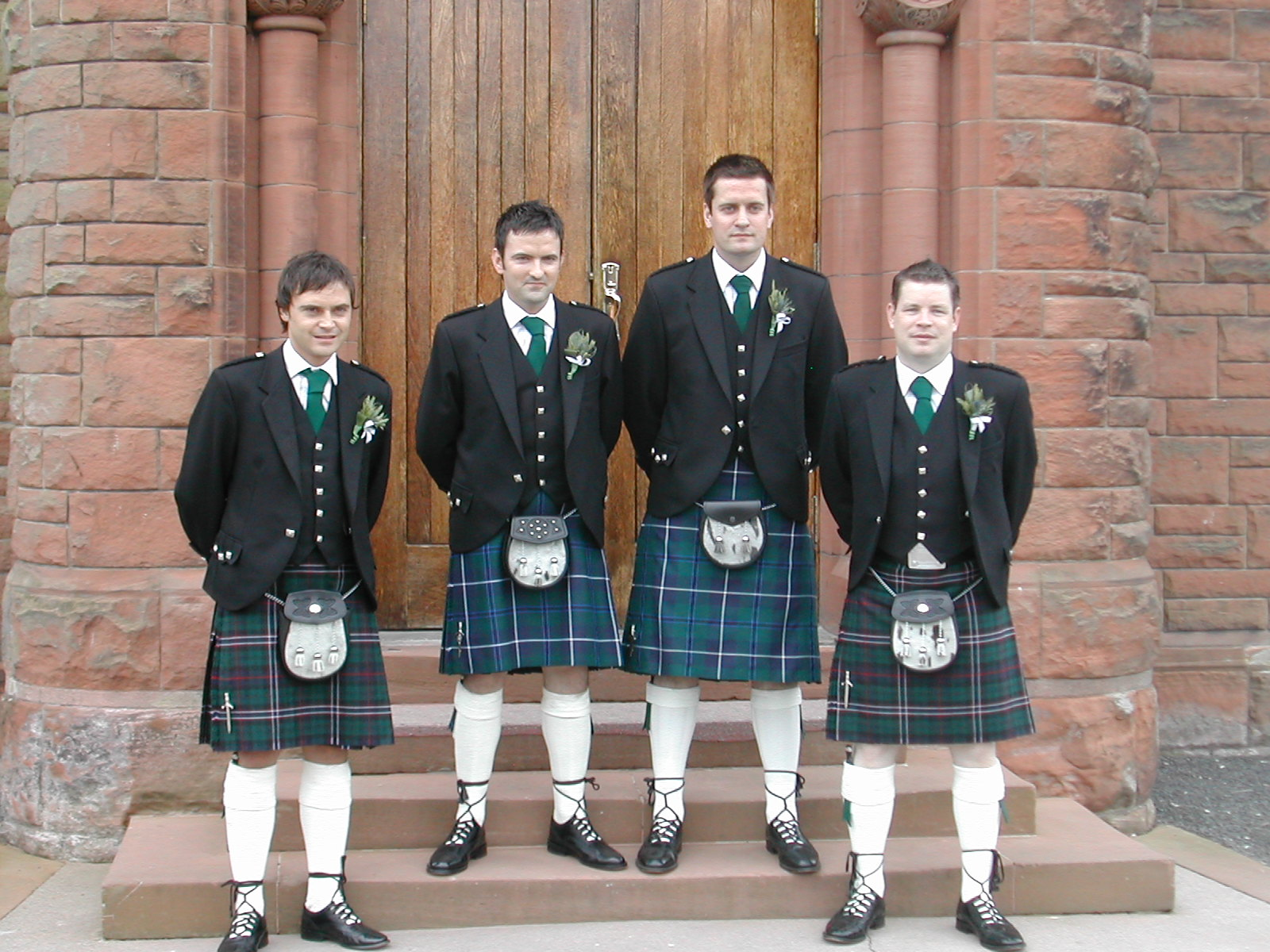
The groom, his best man, and two ushers.

The most visible duty of the groomsmen is helping guests find their places before the ceremony and to stand near the groom during the wedding ceremony.

Additionally, the groom may request other kinds of assistance, such as planning celebratory events such as a bachelor party, also called a "stag do" or "buck's night"; helping make the wedding pleasant for guests by talking with people who are alone or dancing with unaccompanied guests or bridesmaids, if there is dancing at a wedding reception; or providing practical assistance with gifts, luggage, or unexpected complications. Groomsmen may also participate in local or regional traditions, such as decorating the newlywed couple's car.

Bridegroom-men formerly had important duties. The men were called "bride-knights" and represented a survival of the primitive days of marriage by capture, when a man called his friends in to assist to "lift" or kidnap the bride, or from the need to defend the bride from would-be kidnappers.

== Best man ==
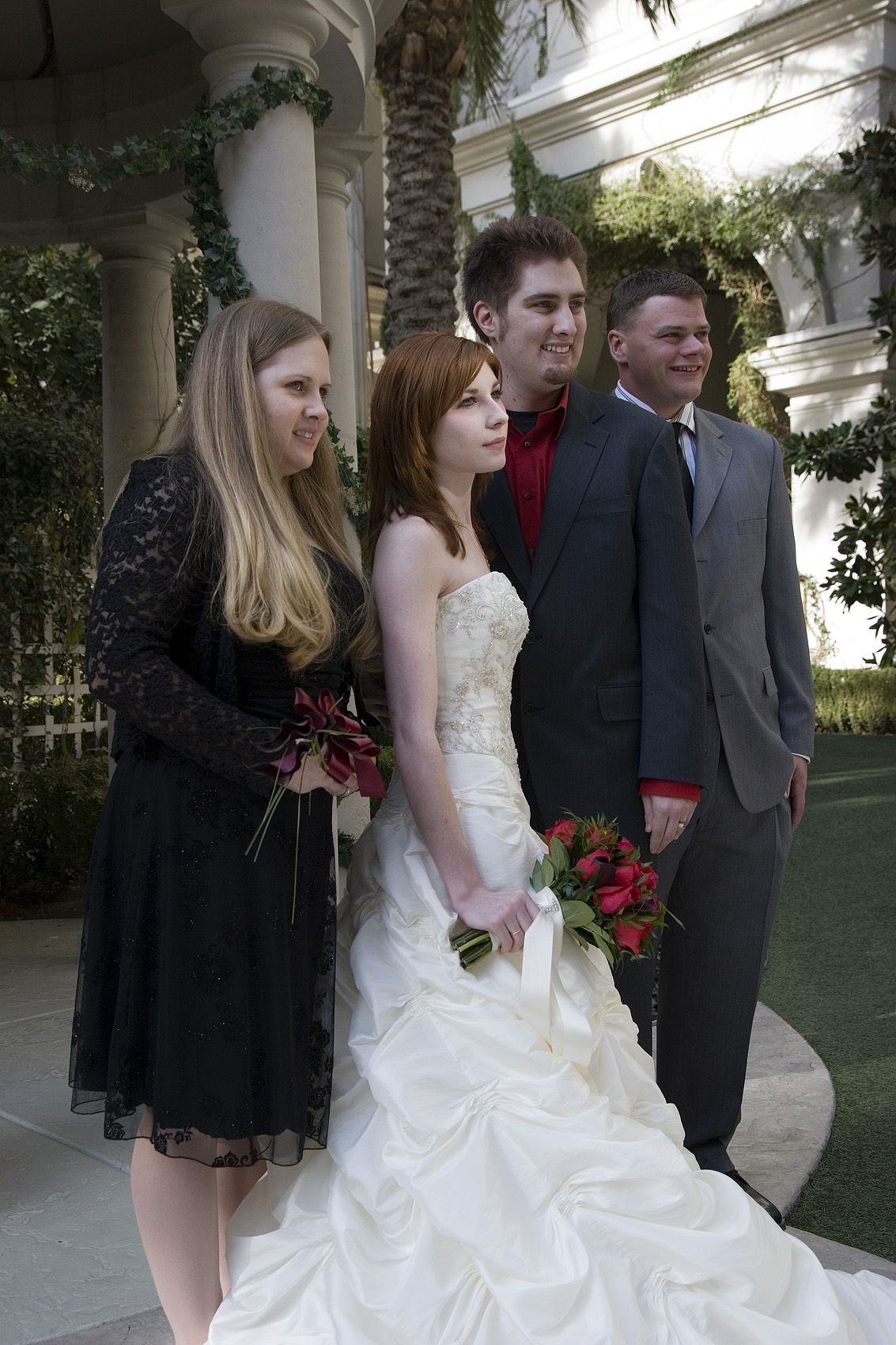
A best man and a maid of honour with newlyweds

The best man is the chief assistant to the groom at a wedding. While the role is older, the earliest surviving written use of the term best man comes from 1782, observing that "best man and best maid" in the Scottish dialect are equivalent to "bride-man and bride-maid" in England.

In most modern Anglophone countries, the groom extends this honor to someone who is close to him, generally a close friend or a relative (such as a sibling or cousin). During a wedding ceremony the best man stands next to the groom, slightly behind him. This means that the four people present at the altar are the officiant (such as a civil celebrant, priest, rabbi, minister, or other religious figure), the bride, groom, and best man. This is common in some Western countries, although in others the best man and bridesmaid participate on an equal footing.

While the best man's required duties are only those of a friend, in the context of a Western white wedding, the best man will typically:

- Assist the groom on the wedding day,
- Organize a bachelor party,
- Keep the wedding rings safe until needed during the ceremony,
- Stand next to the groom during the ceremony,
- Act as a legal witness to the marriage and therefore sign the marriage certificate, and
- Prepare a "best man's speech" to be read at the reception

=== In various countries and cultures ===
The best man is not a universal custom. Even in places where a best man is customary, the role may be quite different when compared to other areas of the world.

- In the Anglosphere, it is traditional for the best man to give a short speech. On the Continent, it has become common practice for all the grooms and maids to deliver speeches in addition to the fathers, brothers, and sisters.
- In Zambia, a best man is expected to lead processions both at the wedding, and at preliminary events. This includes pre-wedding dance rehearsals, at which the best man is always expected to be in attendance, and he is usually expected to give an outstanding and outlandish dance performance on the actual wedding day.
- In Uganda, a best man is expected to guide the newlyweds in the ways of marriage. This means that ideally a best man must be married, preferably to one wife, and should be in a position to give sound, tried and tested advice. A best man must be a confidant and be discreet about the details he shares with the new couple.
- In Bhutan, the best man presents himself at the wedding as a ceremonial guardian to both bride and groom. Thereafter he entertains the guests, sometimes for several hours.
- In Eastern Orthodox weddings in Greece, the best man is often also the koumbaros, or religious sponsor. The koumbaros (or koumbara, if a woman) is an honored participant who crowns the couple and participates in circling the altar three times. Sometimes, this person also pays for most of the wedding expenses.
- In Ukraine, the best man is responsible for guarding the bride during the wedding festivities. In a traditional wedding, when he or the groom stepped away, the bride would be "kidnapped" or have a shoe stolen. Then the groom or the best man would have to pay a ransom in exchange for returning the bride, usually by paying money (which was given to the bride) or by doing something embarrassing. This custom is less common nowadays due to frequent conflicts arising from the differences in the expected sum of money.

== Bachelor party ==
In the past, the bachelor party was typically scheduled for a convenient evening during the week before the wedding. A type of farewell dinner, it was always hosted, and therefore organized and paid for, entirely by the groom. The dinner was seen as the groom's last chance to entertain his friends as a single man; after the wedding, dinner parties at his home would always be presided over by his wife in her role as hostess. In recent times this practice has evolved. In many cultures, it is a customary practice for the groom to bear all the expenses of his bachelor party. This tradition highlights the groom's role in hosting a final celebration with his friends before his marriage.

Common slang names for this event in different parts of the world are stag do, stag weekend, stag party, and buck's night. In many areas, this dinner is now most commonly organized by the best man; the costs can be shared by either all of the participants or all of the participants except for the groom, who becomes the guest of honor.

== See also ==
- Bridesman
- Bridesmaid
