= Personal wedding website =

Website used for wedding planning

Personal wedding websites are websites that engaged couples use to aid in planning and communication for their wedding. The websites are used to communicate with guests about their wedding and inform them of the location, date, time, and gift registry. The websites can be free but may sometimes cost a fee.

Personal wedding websites differ from wedding vendor websites, which may allow customers to plan and book very small weddings using that vendor's location, officiant, photographer, and other services.

== Purpose ==
Personal wedding websites are generally used as a replacement for, or supplement to, traditional wedding invitations. While traditional mailed invitations remain a common part of wedding customs, wedding websites present a more interactive and comprehensive means of communication, along with increased functionality. These online platforms often allow guests to RSVP directly, buy wedding gifts, and find additional information about local hotels or attractions. If wedding details change, the website can be updated with the new information. Personal wedding websites may also be used to share wedding photos and videos, and bridal party biographies.

Increasingly, the sites are being used as tools for wedding planning. Many do-it-yourself sites offer features like online RSVP, blogs, registry management, and budget management tools to aid couples through the wedding organizing process.

Finally, beyond logistical details, wedding websites may be used by couples to showcase their personality and set the tone for what their wedding will be like. Couples can post engagement photos, share their story, and link to any online wedding gift registries. These websites may also feature an online guestbook where guests can leave comments and well-wishes.

== Industry and costs ==
As of 2018, 74% of married couples created a wedding site (up from 59% in 2015). Along with this growth in use, there has been a growth in worldwide wedding website suppliers. Each website offers different templates and services, and some charge a fee to use them and experts recommend comparing websites before choosing one.

Depending on the specific site, some suppliers will host the wedding site for six months, 12 months, or forever. The cost is strongly correlated between factors such as domain name, advertisements appearing on the page, number of pages available, and different amounts/types of media available. Industry experts have recommend the married couple keep the site alive for at least twelve months, correlating to the traditional amount of time that guests have to buy wedding gifts.

Most brides see personal wedding website, particularly free ones, as a more cost-efficient way of planning and informing friends and family about their wedding. However, some of these websites may promote expensive wedding products and ideas. With free or fee-based websites, the user receives their own domain name for the website.

== Etiquette ==
Traditional wedding etiquette guides have questioned the use of wedding websites to share the wedding registry, or whether websites should replace mailed invitations.

In a 2011 survey, 37% of voters said that evites should "never" be sent out, while 49% said it "depended on the wedding," and 14% said "anytime." Many wedding planning books from the 2000s suggest ways to find cheaper wedding invitations but typically do not suggest evites. However, the use of evites has become more common over time, particularly as they are a money-saving and environmentally friendly way of sending invitations.

== See also ==
- Capsule
- Event planning
