= Saber arch =

Wedding tradition involving swords

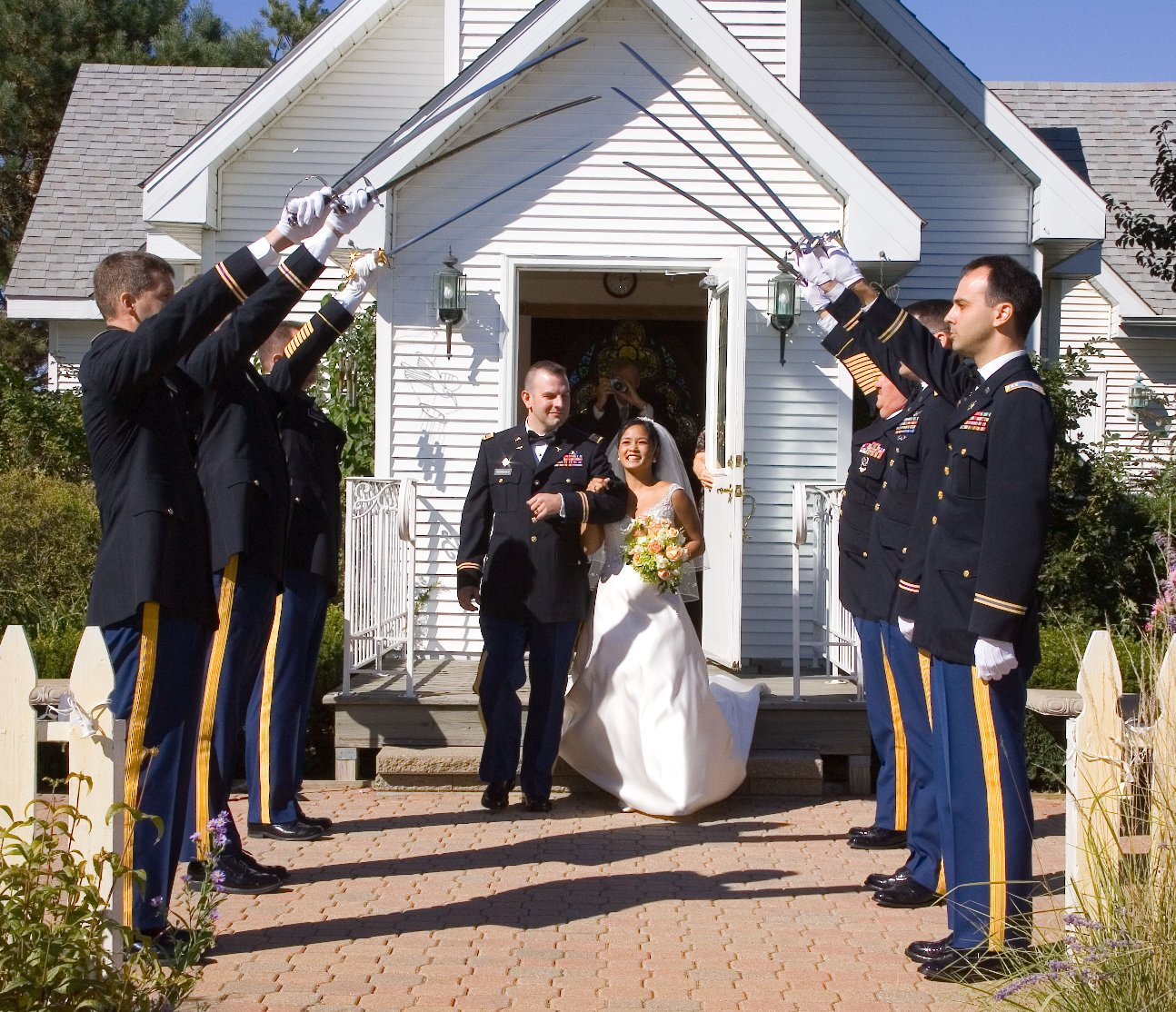
A saber arch at the wedding of a US Army officer and his bride.

A saber arch is a wedding tradition in which sabers or swords are used to salute a newly married couple. The bride and groom pass under an honorary arch of sabers, typically when exiting the building in which the wedding ceremony took place. The tradition is in use worldwide.

Jocular imitations of it also occur, as in using cricket bats or hockey sticks and such in the nuptials of a professional or dedicated amateur athlete.

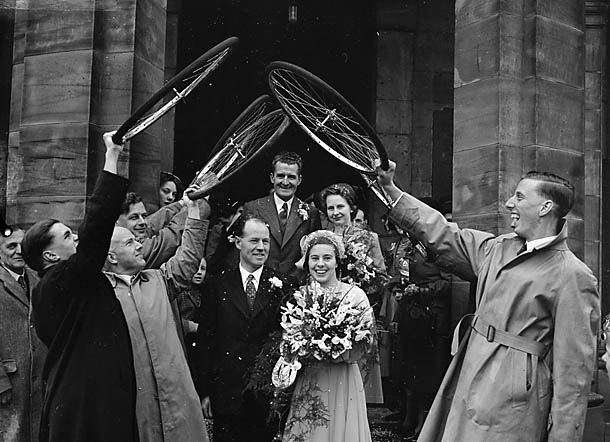
Sporting equipment such as bicycle wheels or hockey sticks can be also used if a bride or a groom is an athlete

== United States, Canada and United Kingdom ==
In the United States, Canada and United Kingdom, the tradition is often performed at the weddings of military or police service members and had its origins in the Royal Navy. The tradition varies slightly among the different branches of the United States Armed Forces and Canadian Armed Forces and is considered a privilege accorded to members of the service. Usually, an honor guard composed of officers or NCOs, often from the same unit as the service member, form the arch with sabers or swords.

=== The ceremony ===
Officers and enlisted personnel in the bridal party wear formal dress uniforms in accordance with seasonal regulations of the services. A female may wear a traditional bridal gown, or she may be married in uniform. White gloves are required for all saber or sword bearers, who are normally officers or NCOs. Military or police guests usually have the option to attend the wedding in uniform or appropriate civilian attire, but none may carry a saber or sword unless attired in a formal dress uniform.

Immediately after the marriage ceremony is officiated, usually but not always in a building such as a church or chapel, the saber team positions itself in formation just outside the doorway, with typically six or eight saber bearers taking part. The guests of the wedding are afforded the opportunity to assemble outside to view the event before it begins.

On the command, the saber team raises their sabers into a high arch, with tips nearly touching and the blades facing up and away from the bride and groom. As the newly married couple exits the building, the senior usher announces, "Ladies and gentlemen, it is my honor to present to you (American rank or Canadian rank) and Mr/s. (insert name)" This is modified when both parties are in the military or the police.

The bride and groom proceed into the arch, and as the couple passes through, the last two saber bearers usually lower the sabers in front of the couple, detaining them momentarily. Before releasing the couple, the saber bearer to the couple's left gives the bride a gentle swat on her backside with his saber, announcing "Welcome to the (insert branch) Ma'am!" If the bride is in the military or police, this step is omitted. In some ceremonies, every pair of saber bearers may lower their sabers, stopping the couple from proceeding each time. One of the pair may say something along the lines of, "Kiss required to pass," and the bearers will not raise their sabers until the bride and groom share a kiss. After the couple leaves the arch, the saber team recovers on command and dissolves formation.

Only the bride and groom pass under the arch. It is also traditional at the wedding reception for the wedding cake to be cut with a saber or sword.

== Germany and Austria ==
In Germany and Austria, saber arches are commonly employed by various types of male-only Studentenverbindungen (student fraternities).

At weddings, the current officials – usually a team of three – salute their newlywed member and his bride by a single arch featuring a flag just outside the church. No further protocol is common.

In a similar fashion, the aforementioned officials salute their deceased brothers at funerals. Usually walking directly behind the coffin bearers in the procession, they surround the grave from three sides at the graveyard. The saber arch is then presented from both sides, and the flag is raised above the head of the corpse. As the coffin is lowered into the earth, both the saber arch and the flag follow him, usually resting there while last words are uttered.

Sabers are commonly held by the first and second member in charge, whereas the third highest-ranking member presents the flag, usually displaying the fraternity's characteristic colors or coat of arms. The process is inspired by military traditions, as early Studentenverbindungen consisted mostly of officers or aristocrats. The uniforms worn are usually derived from those employed in the Polish revolution of 1830 and are complete with hat, sash and jacket in the fraternity's colors, white pants, riding boots with spurs and white gloves.

== Indonesia ==
In Indonesia, this ceremony is known as "Pedang Pora". This ceremony is done on weddings of a military or police officer as either the groom or the bride. Other uniformed services also have a similar ceremony for an officer's wedding ceremony.
