= The Knot Worldwide =

Company

- Predecessor: XO Group, WeddingWire, The Knot Inc.
- Founded: May 1996; 30 years ago (as The Knot Inc.)
- Founder: David Liu; Carley Roney; Tim Chi
- Headquarters: 2 Wisconsin Circle, 3rd Floor, Chevy Chase, Maryland, U.S.
- Key people: Raina Moskowitz (CEO); Michael Pickrum (CFO); Felicity Chaban (CLO); Angel Llull Mancas (CCO)
- Brands: The Knot; WeddingWire; WeddingPro; Bodas.net; Hitched; The Bump; The Bash; Matrimonio.com; Mariages.net; Casamentos.pt
- Services: Online vendor marketplace Registry services Personalized wedding websites Invitations; Digital content and print magazine Advertising eCommerce
- Number of employees: 1,700 (2026)
- Website: www.theknotww.com

The Knot Worldwide (TKWW) is a technology company that operates a portfolio of platforms and brands, including The Knot, WeddingWire and WeddingPro. Formed by a merger between The Knot and WeddingWire, it offers marketplaces, content, tools and resources for wedding planning and other life celebrations.

== History ==
=== Founding ===
David Liu, his wife Carley Roney, and their business partners, Rob Fassino and Michael Wolfson, founded The Knot Inc. in 1996. The Knot brand received seed financing from AOL and was initially released as a portal on AOL. In 1997, TheKnot.com launched as an online digital marketplace.

The company opened an online gift registry in partnership with QVC and published its first book, The Knot Complete Guide to Weddings in the Real World. In December 1999, the company raised $35 million in an initial public offering.

On December 2, 2000, the company launched its own bridal magazine, The Knot Magazine, and went public. In 2004, the company launched a television series, Real Weddings from The Knot, on the Oxygen Network. The Nest brand launched in 2005 with a website aimed at newly married or cohabiting couples creating their new home.

In 2008, the company launched TheBump.com to serve expectant and new parents.

In June 2011, the company officially changed its corporate name to XO Group Inc. and transferred its common stock listing to the New York Stock Exchange (NYSE) with the symbol "XOXO".

Mike Steib joined XO Group as president in July 2013 and assumed the role of CEO in March 2014. In October 2015, XO Group announced the acquisition of GigMasters, an online marketplace for event vendors, and a partnership with Jetaport, a discounted hotel room block booking service.

=== Merger ===
In September 2018, XO Group announced that it would merge with competing wedding planning firm WeddingWire and become a privately held company under the control of WeddingWire investors Permira Funds and Spectrum Equity. The merger became official in March 2019 and the new parent company was renamed to The Knot Worldwide.

=== Expansions and acquisitions ===
In February 2020, The Knot Worldwide announced it acquired Hitched, a U.K.-based wedding brand. In response to COVID-19, the company launched a $10 million assistance program for wedding vendors in need of support and introduced a campaign called Love is Essential covering the cost of dream marriage proposals for essential workers. In 2020, The Knot Worldwide launched The Knot Registry Store. The company also launched The Knot Invitations and later partnered with Vera Wang, JoJo Fletcher, Jordan Rodgers, and Jenna Dewan to introduce limited-edition collections.

The Knot Worldwide launched Fellowship for Change in 2021, an annual program to support underserved wedding professionals in their first five years of business through education, mentorship and funding in the form of free advertising. The Bump and the National Medical Association partnered in 2021 to launch The Black Maternal Health Hub, designed to reduce Black maternal mortality rates.

In 2023, The Knot Worldwide acquired Zankyou Ventures, a Spanish-based global wedding company, and Weven, a CRM/ERP SaaS wedding planning platform.

The company acquired Simply Eloped, an online elopement planning platform, in 2024.

Raina Moskowitz became CEO in 2025, having previously served as Etsy’s COO and CMO. Moskowitz was also on the board of directors of Sprout Social and formerly worked at American Express. She currently sits on the board of Match Group and Tech:NYC.

In August 2025, The Knot partnered with Ring Concierge for a ring scavenger hunt across New York City in celebration of Taylor Swift and Travis Kelce’s engagement.

== Operations ==
The company operates in over 10 countries and includes the following brands: The Knot, WeddingWire, Bodas.net, Hitched, The Bump, The Bash, WeddingPro, Matrimonio.com and others.

The Knot Worldwide offers all-in-one planning tools and resources, such as personalized wedding websites, registries, and paper products. The company provides referrals to vendors of wedding services, primarily small, local and family businesses, for advertising packages.

A 2025 New Yorker piece reported that vendors advertising through the site supposedly experienced high levels of "fake" brides making first contacts that never turned into business. While the company denied that it referred fake accounts to vendors, a lawsuit was filed by vendors in March 2025.

In September 2025, The Knot Worldwide announced a suite of new product enhancements, including intelligent automations and AI-powered tools, such as “Make It Yours”. Developed in-house, “Make It Yours” reduces wedding planning by 20 hours and provides personalized, local vendor recommendations by analyzing a couple's favorited images and matching them to vendors with similar aesthetics.

It also releases research reports, such as its Annual Real Wedding Study, that evaluate the wedding industry across various countries and metrics. In October 2025, The Knot released its global wedding report, finding that October is the most popular month in the United States to wed.

In February 2026, The Knot Worldwide launched an app within ChatGPT, allowing users to access The Knot's vendor marketplace directly within ChatGPT and surface imagery, reviews as well as local options inside the chat interface. It is the first app of this nature within the wedding industry. The same month, the company also announced its $500k grant program, which supports small businesses in the wedding industry.

In March 2026, The Knot Worldwide became one of the brands piloting ads in OpenAI’s ChatGPT agentic AI chat platform.
