= Jewels of Diana, Princess of Wales =

Collection of jewels

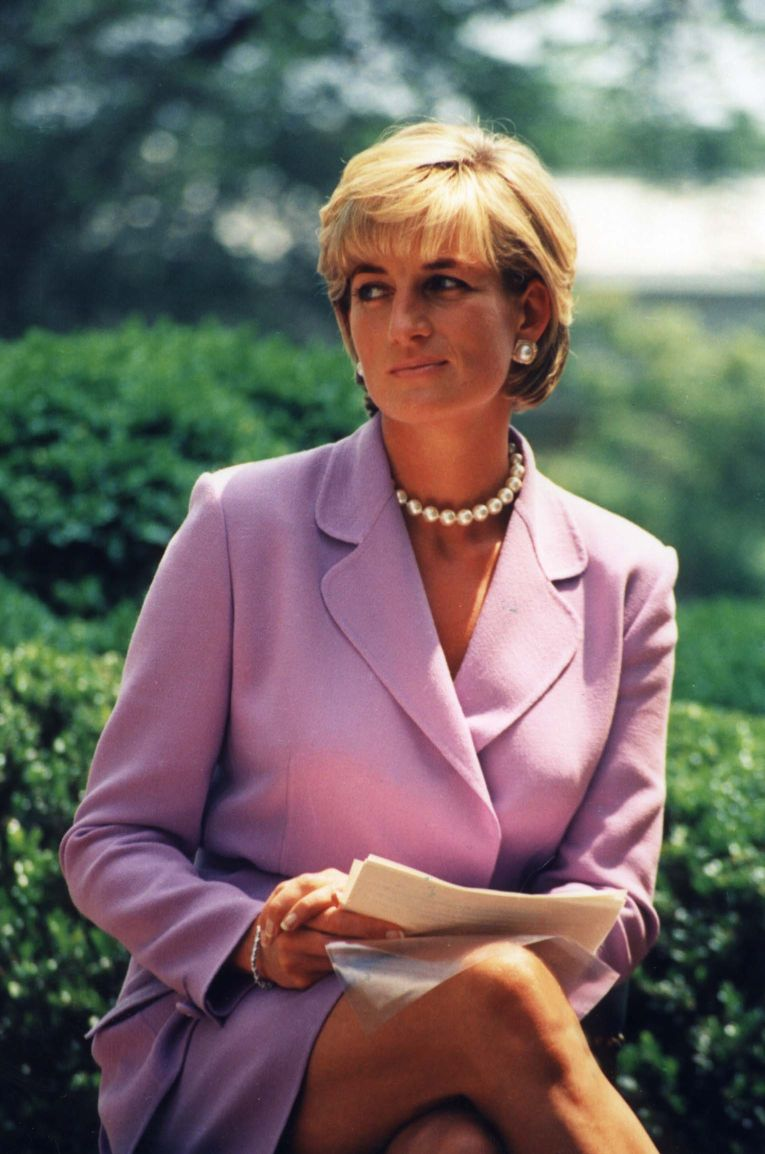
Diana wearing a pearl necklace and pearl earrings, featuring double wire of gold with diamonds and four equidistant knots, during a visit to Washington, D.C. in June 1997

Diana, Princess of Wales, owned a collection of jewels both as a member of the British royal family and as a private individual. These were separate from the coronation and state regalia of the crown jewels. Most of her jewels were either presents from foreign royalty, on loan from Queen Elizabeth II, wedding presents, purchased by Diana herself, or heirlooms belonging to the Spencer family.

Her jewellery was a mix of precious stones and costume pieces, which she sourced from London's Butler & Wilson, often reported by the media as "priceless" jewels, which the princess found amusing. Most jewellery dates from the 19th and 20th centuries. She also had a vast collection of gold accessories, which often went unnoticed and became understated by the media.

At formal occasions, such as banquets, the princess normally wore jewellery lent to her by the Queen, who owned more than 300 items of jewellery. Diana's daughters-in-law, Catherine, Princess of Wales, and Meghan, Duchess of Sussex, have worn various pieces from her collection.

== Early jewellery ==
Born into an affluent aristocratic family, Lady Diana Spencer owned some high quality jewellery. Prior to her marriage to Prince Charles, she often wore a gold Cartier Russian wedding ring of three yellow gold bands on the little finger of her right hand and a diamond and white gold eternity ring from the family collection on her third finger.

The rings remained in the princess's collection but were rarely seen in public during her marriage. Occasionally she was photographed wearing both rings on her left hand. She also wore her family's signet ring which she would wear in combination with her other rings.

As a teenager, Diana wore a gold choker with a 'D' pendant. In 2017, a sterling silver 'D' necklace owned by the princess as a teenager sold at auction for around US$8,000. Diana was photographed wearing her initial necklace as a nursery assistant while still dating Charles. For her 16th birthday her friends gifted her a gold initial necklace. She was also photographed wearing sterling silver earrings with five diamonds. After marrying Charles, she continued to wear the necklace on occasion.

The future Princess had a collection of enamelled bangles and bracelets which she wore frequently as a teenager.

At the age of 16, Diana was a bridesmaid at her sister Jane's wedding to Robert Fellowes on 20 April 1978. She wore a pair of pearl studs and a pearl necklace. The pearl studs were worn by Diana as early as 1975 and were last seen on the princess in 1990 while opening a police station at 462 Fore Street, Edmonton, London.

On her 18th birthday, Diana was given a triple-strand pearl choker by the Spencer family. Both of Diana's older sisters had also received matching chokers on their 18th birthdays. It consisted of three rows of pearls with a turquoise and pearl cluster clasp; the clasp was only visible when it matched the colour of her outfit, otherwise hidden at the back. The princess later altered the clasp to be all pearls.

One of the first gifts Diana received from Prince Charles was an eternity ring which she wore regularly.

At the age of 18, while living in her flat 60 Coleherne Court, London, her apartment was burgled, and she had most of her jewellery stolen.

== Wedding jewels ==
The wedding of Charles and Diana took place on 29 July 1981 at St Paul's Cathedral, London. The princess wore very little jewellery at her wedding. She wore diamond earrings that belonged to her mother, Frances Shand Kydd. She also wore the Spencer family tiara, her engagement ring, and a wedding band placed on her finger by Charles at the ceremony. Her wedding dress designers, the Emanuels, also attached an 18-carat gold horseshoe trinket studded with white diamonds to the label of the dress.

=== Frances Shand Kydd diamond earrings ===
On her wedding day, Diana borrowed her mother's diamond earrings, which consist of a central pear-shaped diamond surrounded by around 50 smaller diamonds. The princess never wore them in public again, but Frances wore them at a number of important occasions, including Prince Harry's christening in 1984, her son's wedding in 1989, and the funeral of her daughter in 1997. After Frances' death in 2004, Lady Sarah McCorquodale, her eldest daughter, inherited them.

For many years, the earrings were a part of the travelling Diana exhibition. In 2011, Lady Sarah withdrew them from the display to wear them at the wedding ball for her nephew, Prince William.

=== The Spencer family tiara ===
Though the piece was once said to date from the 18th century, the Spencer tiara is actually made up of other pieces of jewellery of varying ages and from different jewellers that has gone through several changes over time. The oldest parts of the tiara are the ends. They are said to have come from a tiara that once belonged to Frances Manby, the last Viscountess Montagu, and left to Lady Sarah Spencer in 1875. The centre element was a wedding present from Lady Sarah Isabella Spencer to Lady Cynthia Hamilton (Diana's grandmother), when she married Albert, Viscount Althorp, the future 7th Earl Spencer, in 1919. This piece was remounted by the Goldsmiths and Silversmiths Company at some point, and Garrard was asked to create four matching pieces in 1937 to add on. The full current appearance apparently dates from around 1935. The tiara includes diamonds in silver settings mounted in gold in various floral shapes: stylized tulips, star-shaped flowers, and scrolling foliage. Both of Lady Diana's older sisters, Jane and Sarah, wore the piece at their weddings. However, Diana's mother, Frances, did not wear it when she married into the Spencer family in 1954. While Diana's mother-in-law, Queen Elizabeth II, loaned her the Queen Mary's Lover's Knot Tiara for the wedding, the princess-to-be decided to stick to her family roots and wore the Spencer tiara. Diana frequently wore the piece as it was supposedly lighter and easier to wear than other tiaras at her disposal. Even so, it gave Diana a "cracking headache" according to her brother, Charles Spencer, as she was not used to wearing a tiara for such a long time.

== Tiaras and headbands ==
=== Queen Mary's Lover's Knot tiara ===
In 1913, Garrard & Co (the first official Crown Jewellers) were asked by Queen Mary to make a replica of a tiara owned by her grandmother, Princess Augusta of Hesse-Kassel, using the Queen Mary's own diamonds and pearls. The tiara, in its French neo-classical design, has 19 oriental pearls suspended from lover's knot bows each centred with a large, brilliant diamond. Mary left the tiara to Elizabeth II, who later loaned it to Diana during her marriage to The Prince of Wales. Diana was to wear the tiara during her wedding, but she instead opted for her Spencer family tiara. The princess wore this piece very often as it was given to her on loan. Diana complained about the 'swinging pearls', but she wore it at most of her tiara events. She most notably wore it with her 'Elvis's dress' on a visit to Hong Kong in 1989, but on her divorce from Prince Charles it was returned to the Queen.

The tiara has since been loaned to Catherine, the wife of Prince William. She first wore it to a diplomatic reception at Buckingham Palace in 2015, and has continued to wear it during state occasions.

=== Queen Mary's diamond and emerald choker ===
Made from a present of emeralds and diamonds from the Ladies of India in 1911, this Art Deco choker was created by Garrards in 1921 for Queen Mary and was originally a part of the Delhi Durbar Parure. Given as a wedding gift to Diana from the Queen, who inherited the piece from her grandmother in 1953, it was worn as a bandeau during a dance in Melbourne. It was worn as a choker to other events. The Prince of Wales also presented his wife with a diamond and emerald Art Deco bracelet as a wedding present and matching emerald earrings as a gift for her 22nd birthday. The choker was later worn by Catherine, Princess of Wales.

== Necklaces and pendants ==
=== The Spencer family diamond and pearl drop necklace ===
This necklace can be worn in many different ways. The diamond drops are removable which allows the owner to wear them as earrings. Any number of the pearl drops can be removed which as well can allow the necklace to be worn as a diamond riviere. The princess wore this necklace with a single pearl drop while at the Red Dragon Ball at the Grosvenor House Hotel. This necklace is composed of diamonds and pearls from various periods; it was common among aristocratic families to create new jewels with pieces already in their collection.

The three pearl drop pendants were given as a wedding present from the City of London to Elizabeth Stuart in 1613, which were later inherited by her son, the famous Cavalier Prince Rupert and later sold by his daughter, Ruperta Howe. Ruperta sold the royal pearls to the formidable Sarah Churchill, Duchess of Marlborough. In 1726, Sarah purchased two diamond pendants from the Duchess of Shrewsbury's collection. Together with the Pearls, she merged them with a diamond necklace given to her by Queen Anne. After her death in 1744, the necklace was inherited by her grandson, John, 1st Earl Spencer. At some point, the Diamond Pendants were converted into earrings and were worn by Diana's stepmother, Raine Spencer along with the original diamond riviere.

The necklace has been passed down through the Earls Spencer over the centuries and was first photographed on Charlotte, Countess Spencer in the late 1800s.

It is still very much in use today and the current Countess Spencer, Karen frequently wears several elements from the original necklace.

=== Seven-strand pearl and sapphire choker ===
As a wedding present, Queen Elizabeth the Queen Mother gave a large oval sapphire and diamond brooch to her new granddaughter-in-law. In the early years of her marriage, Diana wore the piece as a brooch, including the famous appearance during the Dutch state visit to the Netherlands in 1982, when the princess had to find a new gown and jewels after Queen Beatrix gave her the Order of the Crown which is worn on an orange sash.

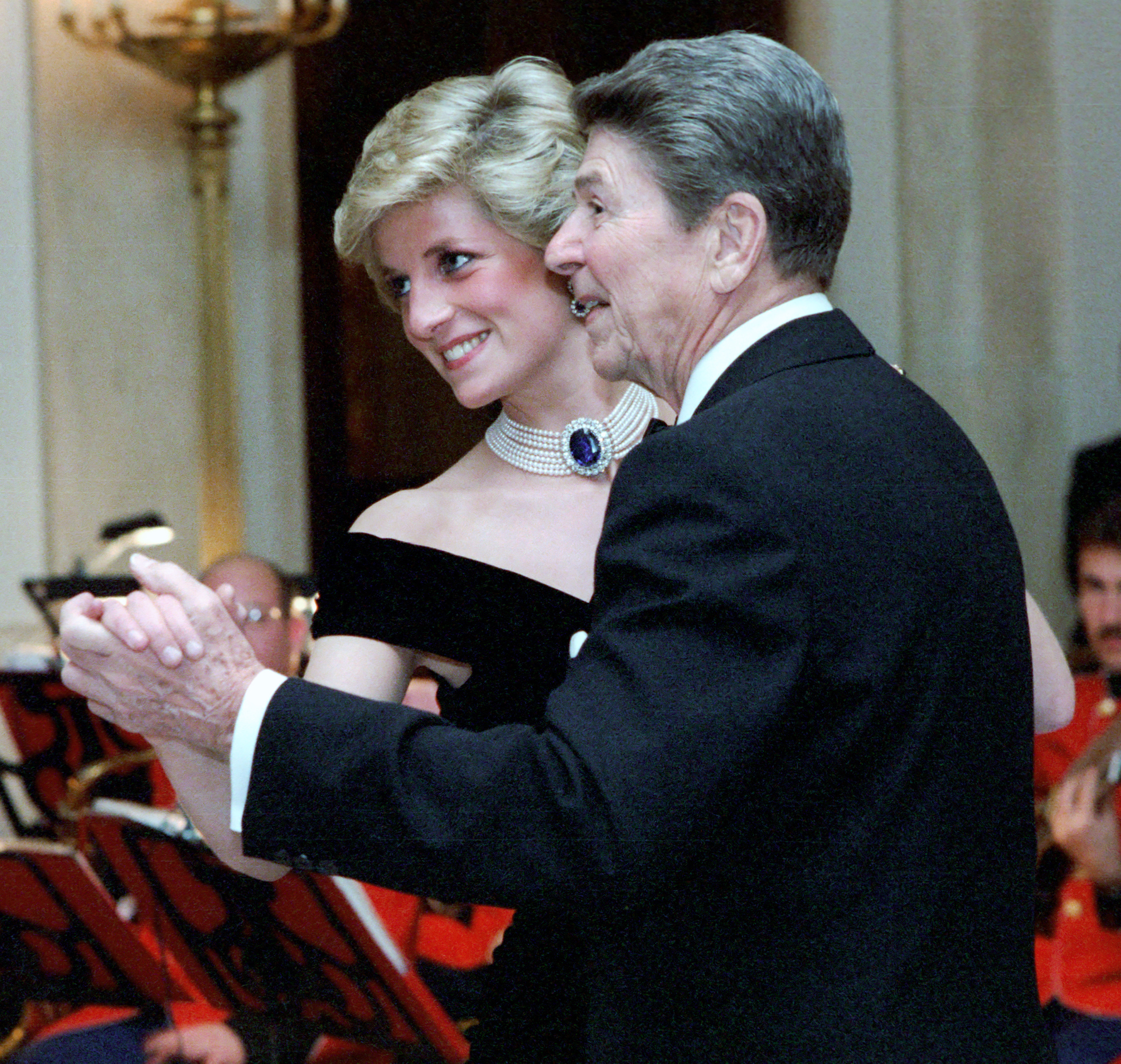
Diana wearing the Pearl and Sapphire Choker while dancing with Ronald Reagan during her official visit to the US in 1985

However, soon after the wedding, the princess had the sapphire brooch converted into the clasp for a magnificent seven-strand pearl choker. One of the earliest famous appearances was in 1985, when she wore the choker to dance with John Travolta at the White House. A favourite piece of jewellery, the princess wore this seven-strand pearl and sapphire choker for occasions at home and abroad. Another famous appearance of the sapphire choker was in 1994, when the princess wore the piece (with the daring 'revenge' dress) on the night the Prince of Wales confessed to adultery with Camilla Parker Bowles.

The seven-strand pearl and sapphire choker was one of the rare 'big' jewels from her marriage that Diana continued to wear after her divorce. The last time the choker was publicly seen was when the princess attended the Met Gala in New York in December 1996. It has not been seen or exhibited since, and now belongs to Prince William and Prince Harry.

Though unconfirmed, many speculate Meghan Markle's engagement ring, which she first wore in November 2017 at her engagement announcement with Prince Harry, includes two diamonds from Diana's famous sapphire and pearl choker. The engagement ring consists of three large diamonds, with one stone in the centre flanked by two smaller stones. According to Harry, the side stones are from his mother's jewellery collection (though it is unclear which piece of jewellery they are from).

=== Four-row Japanese pearl choker ===
This piece was given to Diana as a loan from the queen. The princess first wore the choker during a state visit to the Netherlands in November 1982. The choker contains four rows of Japanese cultured pearls with a central diamond clasp. The piece is now being worn by the Princess of Wales who uses it as a loan from the King.

=== Grey pearl necklace ===
This necklace made up of large dark grey and natural pearls, made by London jeweller Leo de Vroomen was gifted to the princess in 1985 by Prince Charles. It appeared in public only twice: on a trip to Austria in April 1986 and a month later when she visited a school in Japan. It is said the princess did not like it at all and researchers believe it was given in 1985 when their marriage began to fall apart.

=== Engraved gold pendant ===
Following the birth of Prince William, the Prince of Wales presented his wife with a gold pendant that had their son's name engraved on it, in Charles' distinctive handwriting. Diana would regularly wear the pendant in private but only wore it once in public, while at a polo match at Windsor in August that same year. This became a tradition in the family, and in 2013 the then Duchess of Cambridge received a gold disc from her sister which bears the name of her eldest son, Prince George, and the first letter of her husband's name. Since the birth of her two younger children, Charlotte and Louis, she has worn a Daniella Draper gold pendant bearing the initials of her three children's names.

=== Heart-shaped diamond necklace ===
Following the birth of Prince William, the Prince of Wales presented his wife with a necklace made up of seed pearls with a diamond-set heart in the centre.

=== Swan Lake necklace ===
Created by Garrard & Co and made out of 187 diamonds and five South Sea pearls, the necklace was worn by Diana during an appearance at a performance of Swan Lake by the English National Ballet at the Royal Albert Hall two months before her death in 1997. The necklace was created together with a set of earrings, but following her death the suite was sold with permission from her family. The necklace was sold to a Ukrainian couple in 2010 who put it on sale in 2017 at Guernsey's. It was estimated to be worth about $12 million at the time.

=== Eleven-strand pearl choker ===
Made out of "900 pearls paired with columns of diamonds and rubies", this eleven-strand choker was one of Diana's favourite pieces, which she often wore at theatre and film premiers.

=== Children's Caring cross ===
On 24 April 1991, Diana visited a hostel for abandoned children at a FEBEM Foundation for Child Welfare in São Paulo, Brazil. She was extensively photographed wearing a gold cross and chain which the children at the hostel played with. This cross and chain was donated by the princess for a charity auction which was to take place early in September 1997, but it was put into storage for 20 years and then sold to an Australian collector.

=== Attallah Cross pendant ===
The piece is a 1920s pendant by Garrard, bought by businessman Naim Attallah in the 1980s. The piece is set with square-cut amethysts and accented by circular-cut diamonds with a total diamond weight of approximately 5.25 carats. Attallah loaned the pendant to Diana on several occasions, who most famously wore it at a London charity gala in October 1987.

=== King Faisal of Saudi Arabia necklace ===
A gift from King Faisal of Saudi Arabia to Queen Elizabeth II, it is a fringe necklace in design and set with brilliant and baguette cut diamonds. King Faisal bought the necklace, made by the American jeweller Harry Winston, and presented it to her while on a state visit to the United Kingdom in 1967. The Queen lent the necklace to Diana to wear on a state visit to Australia in 1983.

=== King Khalid of Saudi Arabia necklace ===
This necklace was given to Queen Elizabeth II by King Khalid of Saudi Arabia in 1979. It is of the sunray design and contains both round and pear-shaped diamonds. Like the King Faisal necklace, it was made by Harry Winston, and the Queen often lent the necklace to Diana.

== Rings ==
=== Engagement ring ===
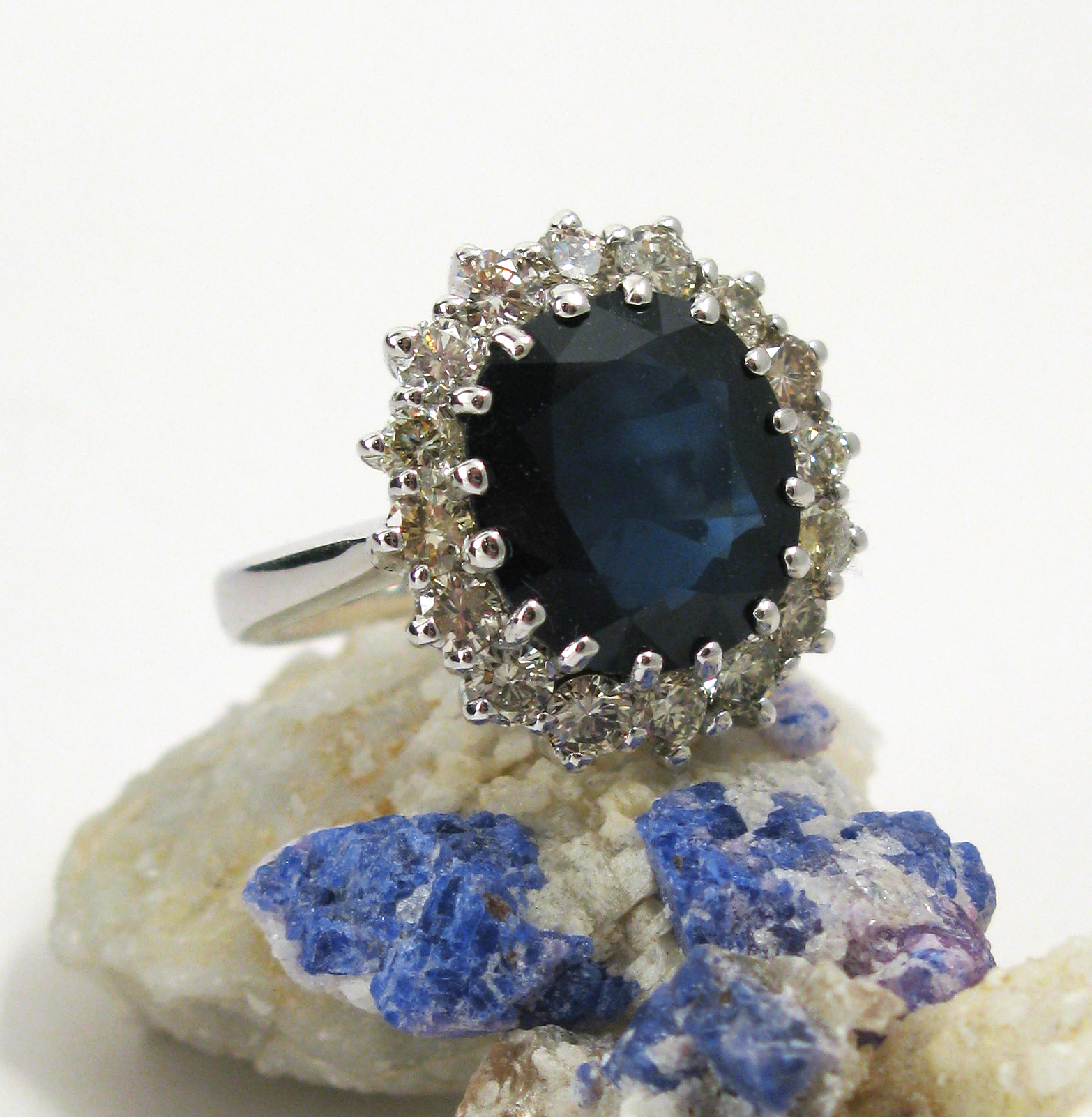
A replica of Lady Diana Spencer's engagement ring

Diana and Charles became engaged in February 1981. Her engagement ring consisted of 14 diamonds surrounding a 12-carat oval blue Ceylon sapphire set in 18-carat white gold. It was created by then-crown jeweller Garrard. The design was inspired by Queen Victoria's sapphire-and-diamond cluster brooch, a wedding present from Prince Albert in 1840, which Victoria donned that day as her "something blue".

Diana's selection of this ring was considered unusual. It was neither custom-made nor unique and was, at the time of her engagement to Charles, featured in Garrard's jewellery collection and available to anyone for purchase. It was reported in the media that Diana selected it because it reminded her of her mother's engagement ring, while others said that she chose it due to its big size. Diana continued to wear the ring even after her divorce from Prince Charles.

When Prince William proposed to Catherine Middleton in the autumn of 2010 in Kenya, he gave her the ring. William later said that giving the ring to his fiancée was a "way of making sure my mother didn't miss out on today and the excitement." Despite rumours that Middleton had the ring resized, she later stated that she and Diana shared "exactly the same size".

Some considered the ring a tragic symbol associated with Diana's failed marriage to the Prince of Wales and untimely death in a car accident in Paris.

=== Welsh gold wedding band ===
The gold for the princess' wedding band followed royal tradition and was made from one of the last soft nuggets of Welsh gold, mined at Clogau St David's gold mine. That same Welsh gold nugget had also provided gold for the wedding bands of the Queen Mother, the Queen, Princess Margaret, Princess Anne among many other royals. The princess' Welsh gold band is engraved on the inside with the words: "I Love You, Diana".

=== Bulgari diamond band ===
Diana was wearing a ring given to her by Dodi Fayed when she died. It was a £3,000 Bulgari yellow gold band with diamonds. The diamond band set in yellow gold was not an engagement ring and was worn on the fourth finger of her right hand, where her butler Paul Burrell advised her to wear it. Photographs taken on 30 August, just before the crash, show that the princess was wearing a gold ring on her right hand. She wore it as a "friendship" ring.

=== Sapphire cabochon ring ===
The princess wore a sapphire cabochon ring during a Christmas photoshoot in 1982 with Prince Charles and their son, Prince William. It is unknown why she never wore it in public, some speculate it belonged to another member of the family and that she wore it to protect her son from getting scratched by her engagement ring while taking photos.

=== Cartier Trinity ring and signet ring ===
During a photo session with royal photographer Tim Graham, at her Kensington Palace apartment on 1 February 1983 the princess wore a Cartier Trinity ring and signet ring with the Prince of Wales feathers which had both been gifts from Prince Charles. The latter had been given to the princess the night before the wedding along with a note that in part read "just look 'em in the eye and knock 'em dead".

=== Aquamarine ring ===
During her lifetime, Diana possessed a set of aquamarine jewels, including an "emerald cut aquamarine stunner", which she first wore at the 1997 auction of her clothes at Christie's. She wore it with the eternity ring she had worn often as a teenager which was originally from the Spencer family collection. It is believed she wore the eternity ring and aquamarine ring together in replacement of her wedding band and engagement ring. She wore the aquamarine again when she visited Sydney, Australia in the summer of 1997.

The aquamarine ring, an emerald cut aquamarine flanked by small, solitaire diamonds and set in 24-carat yellow gold, was commissioned by the princess from Asprey in 1997 and was used by her as a replacement for her engagement ring after her divorce from the Prince of Wales in 1996. It was set on 24-carat yellow gold to match her pre-existing aquamarine bracelet which had been a gift to her from the Royal Family.

The stone was given to her by Lucia Flecha de Lima who was known as the princess' best friend. The stone that is placed on the ring had been taken out of a mine in Brazil where the Queen's aquamarine pieces were usually taken from. After her death, the ring was passed to her younger son Prince Harry who gave it to his wife Meghan Markle to wear at the couple's wedding reception in 2018.

The ring's estimated value is £75,000 in 2018 but given the fact that it was pre-owned by the princess, it would probably now fetch far more than that at auction.

=== Emerald and diamond ring ===
While at a ball held at the Southern Cross Hotel in Melbourne (1985), Princess Diana wore what looked to be an emerald cabochon and diamond ring instead of her engagement ring. The two stones are not aligned but are at an angle to one another, very similar to a style of a bypass ring. She also wore this ring on 11 November 1993 while attending a state banquet hosted by The Yang Di-pertuan Agong of Malaysia at The Dorchester Hotel in London. The ring was referred to as a toi et moi-style (French: you and me), and was a gift from Charles for their first Christmas together as a married couple in December 1981. She wore the ring on 21 June 1989, when the Prince and Princess of Wales attended a dinner given by the Corporation of London at Mansion House in honour of visiting Australian Prime Minister Robert Hawke. The last time she wore it in public was at the Tate Gallery centenary gala dinner, which was also her 36th birthday, 1 July 1997, along with the diamond and emerald drop earrings given as a birthday present by Prince Charles in 1984, the emerald and diamond bracelet he gave her as a wedding present in July 1981 and the Queen Mary emerald choker necklace.

=== Square cut emerald ring ===
While attending a polo match to support Prince Charles in 1989, the Queen loaned the princess a square-cut emerald ring which was incorrectly dubbed by the press as "a gift from a doting husband".

=== "Dis-moi Oui" ("Tell me Yes") ring ===
On 30 August 1997, Dodi Fayed purchased a £11,000 "budget" engagement ring from a Repossi boutique in Monte Carlo. This was picked out by the princess previously. It is believed he died before he could give it to the princess. It was recovered from Dodi's flat, after the couple's death, along with a receipt listing a "bague de fiançaille" (engagement ring). It was later displayed in a Harrods store.

== Earrings ==
=== Pearl studs ===
Diana's love for pearls started early in her life. While her school friends often wore diamond studs, the future princess usually chose pearls. At the age of 15, Lady Diana Spencer was first seen wearing a pair of simple pearl earrings; she wore them as a bridesmaid at her sister's wedding. These earrings were among the few pieces of jewellery that were not stolen from the princess while living in her London flat prior to her engagement.

=== Tiffany earrings ===
In 1994, Diana and her son Prince William were in the royal box at central court during the Wimbledon tennis tournament. The princess was photographed extensively wearing an 18 carat gold Signature Tiffany five-row bracelet from 1992. She was also seen wearing the bracelet and the matching earrings on 3 July 1994 at the Wimbledon men's finals.

=== Platinum teardrop earrings ===
These platinum earrings were worn by Diana when she fell asleep during an appearance in 1981, which gave her the nickname of “Sleeping Beauty”. She would announce her pregnancy with Prince William shortly after. The earrings were believed to have been on loan from the Queen and matched pearl choker she wore. The centre stone of the earrings were either a diamond or opal (reports differ). They have not been seen on any member of the family since her death.

=== Gold kidney bean-shaped earrings ===
On 31 August 1997, the princess was wearing a pair of gold, kidney bean-shaped earrings with four rolls which were believed to have been given to her by Dodi Fayed. It was last worn by the princess on the day of her death and subsequently became one of the 14 personal effects recovered from the crash scene. Due to the impact of the collision the earrings broke. Nurse Nubmbert received a call from Balmoral in the wake of the princess's passing and was asked if the princess was "wearing her favourite gold earrings". When the princess's body arrived at the hospital, she was only wearing the gold earring on her left ear. Paul Burrell received most of the princess's personal effects at the Pitié-Salpêtrière Hospital in Paris. He was given only one gold earring, and the other one was later found lodged in the Mercedes' dashboard with the clasp missing and slightly dented on 23 October 1997.

=== Diamond and emerald drop earrings ===
The princess had only 2 pieces of emerald jewellery in her collection, an emerald and diamond bracelet given to her as a wedding gift from her new husband Prince Charles and a pair of diamond and emerald drop earrings which had also been given to the princess from Charles; this time as a gift for her 22nd birthday. The earrings, consisting of pear-shaped emerald stones suspended on a diamond drop chain (set in platinum). The modern-style earrings dated from the 1920s, and were made to match the Delhi Durbar Parure, a suite of Cambridge emeralds originally owned by Queen Mary.

=== Butler and Wilson silver bow heart drop earrings ===
The princess purchased these earrings herself from the costume jewellery store Butler and Wilson in the 1980s. The earrings came with 2 interchangeable heart drops, one made of crystal, and one made of faux pearl. The princess wore the earrings with the crystal heart drop while visiting Milan in 1985 during the Prince and Princess' royal tour of Italy. The press misreported that the heart drop earrings were a "priceless gift from the Queen". The princess wore the faux pearl heart drop while tour of Bosworth Battlefield Visitor Centre near Sutton Cheney on Thursday, 27 June 1985.

=== The Queen's pearl drop earrings ===
During the princess's official 1983 visit to Australia, the Queen loaned a pair of pearl drop earrings which had been made by Garrard. The earrings which are set in a modern gold setting were made from stones from the Queen's collection. The earrings were loaned frequently by the Queen to Diana.

=== Pearl and diamond button earrings ===
The princess wore pair of large pearl and diamond button earrings which were similar to a pair of earrings favoured by the Queen. The earrings were worn regularly during 1993 notably while the princess attended a dance spectacular in London and while attending a performance of Mozart's 'The Magic Flute'. The round pearl with round diamond underneath are likely faux as they are both too identical to each other. It is near impossible to find identical pearls, especially ones of such large size.

=== Diamond and South Sea pearl earrings ===
Featuring "a circular design of diamonds and a single diamond-encrusted pear", these dangling earrings were worn by Diana at numerous occasions in the 1990s. Diana last wore them at an appearance at the Royal Albert Hall, but had the pearl drops removed for this outing. The earrings were later passed to Prince William who gave them to his wife, Catherine, Princess of Wales. The Princess had the earrings modified and replaced the original pearl drops with smaller pearls. The piece was first worn by the Princess at the red carpet for the 71st British Academy Film Awards.

=== Collingwood pearl earrings ===
The pair of earrings was given to Diana as a wedding present from her husband. The earrings were created by the Collingwood jewellers and worn by Diana at different outings and engagements. She first wore them at an outing a month before her marriage to Charles. They are now in the possession of the princess's daughter-in-law, Catherine, Princess of Wales, who first wore them in 2017 during a state banquet and has continued to wear them occasionally.

=== Aquamarine and diamond earrings ===
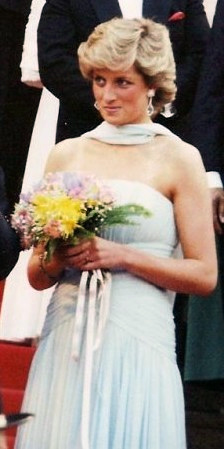
The Princess of Wales wearing the Aquamarine and Diamond Earrings at the 1987 Cannes Film Festival

First worn by the Princess of Wales at the 1987 Cannes Film Festival, the earrings were made out of "whopping pear-shaped aquamarines, surrounded by diamonds and suspended from a diamond flower cluster".

=== Diamond and ruby studs ===
Little is known about these diamond and ruby stud earrings other than the fact that a photograph of the princess wearing them made the cover of People magazine - 11 March 1996: "DI-Vorce" - Princess Diana's Divorce Begins.

=== Pearl, sapphire, and ruby earrings ===
An example of mix-and-match statement studs, the earrings were made out of a pearl and a large blue sapphire on one side, and a pearl and large red ruby on the other. The princess famously wore them during a visit to South Korea in 1992.

=== Emir of Qatar floral pearl earrings ===
Given to the princess as a wedding present from the Emir of Qatar, the earrings featured "white diamonds in a floral shape and cream-coloured pearls". Diana wore the pair many times at various outings and events.

=== Greville pear-drop earrings ===
Alongside 60 other pieces of jewellery, Margaret Greville left Queen Elizabeth (later the Queen Mother) a set of pear-drop earrings that she had bought from Cartier in 1938. The earrings had been made using family stones. The pear-shaped drop diamonds each weigh about 20 carats (4 g). Diana borrowed them in 1983 to wear on her first official visit to Australia. At a state banquet, she wore the earrings with the Spencer Family Tiara.

== Brooches ==
=== The Prince of Wales's Feathers diamond brooch ===
On her wedding day, Diana was given this brooch by the Queen Mother as a wedding present. The brooch shows the Prince of Wales's feathers and was often worn by the princess on a diamond tennis necklace with a cabochon emerald drop. The diamond necklace was from the Saudi suite of jewellery she received as a wedding present. The brooch was originally a gift to Princess Alexandra of Denmark upon her marriage to Albert Edward, Prince of Wales in 1863.

=== Badge of the Royal Family Order of Queen Elizabeth II ===
The Royal Family Order is an honour presented to female members of the British royal family by Queen Elizabeth II. The order is worn on formal occasions and is pinned to the dress of the recipient on the left shoulder. It depicts a young Queen Elizabeth II in evening gown wearing the ribbon and star of the Order of the Garter. The miniature picture, which was originally painted on ivory but, since 2017 on glass, is bordered by diamonds and surmounted by a Tudor Crown in diamonds and red enamel. The reverse, in silver-gilt, is patterned with rays and depicts the royal cipher and St Edward's Crown in gold and enamel. The watered silk ribbon is a chartreuse, yellow colour and formed into a bow.

=== Butler & Wilson snake brooch ===
The princess had a large collection of costume jewellery made by one of her favourite costume jewellers, Butler & Wilson. In her vast collection of Butler & Wilson pieces was a snake brooch which was worn by the princess on 3 May 1986 while in Vancouver, British Columbia.

=== Diamond flower brooch ===
The brooch was passed to Diana after the death of her friend, art dealer and a former member of the board of directors of the Royal Ballet Adrian Ward-Jackson, in 1991. It featured a central stone and 18 diamond petals.

== Bracelets and watches ==
=== Diamond and emerald Art-Deco style bracelet ===
This bracelet was a wedding gift from Charles and purchased from Wartski. It was one of only two pieces in Diana's personal collection containing real emeralds, a stone Diana didn't often wear.

Diana wore this bracelet notably while at London's Barbican Centre in 1982 and would continue wearing it early on in their relationship. The bracelet was later put aside and was not worn again until she chose it for a gala dinner on her 36th birthday. She teamed it with a pair of emerald earrings, the only other emeralds she had owned which had been a gift from Charles on her 22nd birthday.

=== Seven-row pearl bracelet ===
This seven-row pearl bracelet with vertical bar spacers was worn by the princess as attended the Victoria and Albert Museum's Splendours of the Gonzagas exhibition on 4 November 1981. The princess was photographed falling asleep here and subsequent photographs were dubbed "The Sleeping Beauty".

=== The Queen's modern baguette and brilliants bracelet ===
In 1982, the Queen commissioned a diamond bracelet from Garrards. The bracelet which consisted of diamonds with a baguette and brilliant cut was worn regularly by the Queen before being loaned to the princess in 1983 for her state visit to Australia.

=== The Swiss Federal Republic's watch ===
In 1947, the Queen received a wedding gift from The Swiss Federal Republic which was a specially designed platinum watch by the world's oldest watch factory, Vacheron & Constantin. In 1981, the Queen gave the watch as a wedding gift to the princess.

=== Gold cable link bracelet ===
On 27 February 1981, before Diana's marriage to Prince Charles, the future princess was asked by schoolboy Nicholas Hardy "May I kiss the hand of my Future Queen" after giving her a daffodil, during her visit to Cheltenham. Photographs of him kissing her hand were all over the papers and he became the first person to kiss her hand in public.

=== Gold weave bracelet and Patek Philippe gold watch ===
For Diana's 20th birthday her then-fiancé Prince Charles gave her a gold woven bracelet along with a Calatrava 18 carat yellow gold watch by Swiss maker Patek Philippe which cost around £3,500. They were both worn at Windsor in 1983.

=== Gold charm bracelet ===
Diana did not often wear this piece in public, which was a wedding gift from her husband. Each year on their anniversary, he gave his wife a different charm. The bracelet included a miniature of St Paul's Cathedral, where the couple married, a pair of ballet shoes, as the princess loved ballet, a polo cap, representing her husband's love of the sport, a bear, as Diana loved teddy bears, an apple that symbolized her fondness for New York, and a pig. Two other charms with the engravings W and H were given to her by the Prince when their two sons were born.

=== Cartier Tank Louis and Tank Française watches ===
Diana possessed an 18-carat yellow gold framed Tank Louis Cartier watch with a black alligator strap which was a gift from her late father, John Spencer, who died in 1992. By 1996 she stopped wearing the engraved Patek Philippe watch which was a gift from her ex-husband and started wearing a yellow gold Cartier Tank Française watch instead.

The piece now belongs to the Duchess of Sussex, who first wore it for a portrait published in a special edition of Time 100 in October 2020.

=== Tiffany five-row signature bracelet ===
In 1994, Princess Diana and her son Prince William were in the box at central court during the Wimbledon tennis tournament. The princess was photographed extensively wearing an 18 carat gold Signature Tiffany five-row bracelet from 1992. The princess was also seen wearing the bracelet and the matching earrings on 3 July 1994 at the Wimbledon men's final.

=== Gold "P R" link bracelet ===
Little is known about this delicate gold bracelet other than the fact that photographs of the princess wearing this bracelet made the cover of People magazine, 11 March 1996 titled "DI-Vorce" - Princess Diana's Divorce Begins.

=== Pair of sapphire cabochon and diamond bracelets ===
Originally worn as a necklace on 14 November 1985 for a State Banquet for the Emir of Qatar. The princess later converted the necklace into a pair of sapphire cabochon and diamond bracelets and wore them at the Night of Childhood in Versailles event on 28 November 1994.

=== Gold overlap bangle ===
On 24 April 1991 the princess visited an AIDS hospice for children in Toronto, Canada. Here she was photographed wearing multiple gold pieces of jewellery including a gold overlapping bangle and a long gold cross necklace. The latter was sold privately and now owned by an Australian collector.

=== Five-strand pearl bracelet with emerald cut aquamarine stone and diamond flower clasp ===
A five-strand pearl bracelet set in 24 carat gold with a large aquamarine stone and a diamond flower clasp was given to the princess during her early days into the royal family and she constantly wore it in the 80s and after her divorce. It has regularly been misquoted as being part of a set as she had started wearing an aquamarine ring that was of almost an identical size to the bracelet; but the bracelet was in fact a pre-existing piece in her collection, having been a gift during her early days as a royal. Another inaccuracy reported by the media was that she had two 5-strand pearl bracelets, one with a diamond flower clasp and another with an aquamarine clasp. But it was later discovered to be the one piece with different sides of the bracelet to have different clasps. Photographs taken of the princess on 9 November 1982 while she was at The Guildhall in London for a fashion show raising funds for Birthright (the charity for which she was patron) show both sides of the bracelet clearly.

=== Gold bracelet with heart charm ===
This bracelet, which was very similar to her gold cable link bracelet was worn by the princess during her early years of marriage. The bracelet was first worn on 4 April 1983 and then worn a few more times before being worn for the last time on 1 January 1984. Authors such as Andrew Morton have speculated that it was a gift from her husband during their "happy" years of their marriage.

=== Cartier diamond bracelet ===
A diamond Cartier bracelet worn by Diana during the auction of her outfits in New York in 1997. Not much is known about the bracelet other than it was worn again by the Duchess of Sussex while at Prince Charles' 70th birthday.

=== Gold chain link bracelet ===
This gold chain link bracelet with round spaces was worn by the princess while at an AIDS hostel for children. Here she was photographed with the children who were all diagnosed with AIDS and HIV. She was seen letting these children play with her gold jewellery, particularly her long gold cross necklace as well as her shiny engagement ring. She would wear big "chunky" gold jewellery for the children to play with.

=== Three-strand pearl bracelet ===
Created by Nigel Milne, this bracelet was made out of three rows of pearls "with diamond and pearl spacers and clasp". The piece was famously worn by Diana during her visit to Hong Kong and together with the famous 'Elvis's dress'. The piece now belongs to the Duchess of Cambridge, who first wore the bracelet during her official tour of Germany in 2017. It was also worn by the Duchess of Cambridge to a G7 reception in 2021.

=== Gold bangle with burnished-set diamonds ===
This gold bangle had burnished diamonds that were set similarly to a Cartier Love bracelet. This bracelet was worn by the princess in Ottawa, Ontario, Canada on 29 October 1991. Photographs of the princess on this date show her clearly wearing this bangle. This bangle was also worn by the princess while attending a Pavarotti concert on 30 July 1991.

=== Aquamarine and diamond bracelet ===
While attending the Cannes Film Festival in 1987, Princess Diana wore an aquamarine and diamond bracelet with a pair of matching drop aquamarine and diamond earrings.

=== Gold bangle ===
In the princess's jewellery collection, she had a plain gold bangle which she wore to many semi to informal occasions such as walkabouts. Diana was seen wearing the bangle at European Horse Trials near Burghley House on 10 September 1989 among many other dates. She would regularly wear the bangle with her gold link bracelet.

=== Amethyst and diamond bracelet ===
While in Chicago in 1996, the princess wore a double-row amethyst bracelet with an oval amethyst and diamond clasp. This was paired with a dress of the same rich purple colour.

=== Small gold charm bracelet ===
This gold charm bracelet was a part of the princess's jewellery collection for many years but as it was small it was not noticed by many people. This was worn by the princess while attending a Pavarotti concert on 30 July 1991 as well as on many other occasions.

=== Diamond and sapphire cluster link bracelet ===
On 24 September 1996 the princess of Wales attended a Charity Gala. While at this event, Diana was seen with a new diamond and sapphire bracelet (on her left wrist). Not much is known about the bracelet. Although the bracelet looks similar to the watch in the Saudi Arabian suite, it is not part of the Saudi Arabian suite as the watch strap from the Saudi Arabian suite had been turned into earrings and a choker.

=== Gold link bracelet ===
This small gold link bracelet was worn by the princess for informal occasions and was regularly worn with her gold bangle. Among the many dates the princess wore the pieces together was in Japan while touring a children's hospital on 12 November 1990.

=== Black and white star bracelet from Butler & Wilson ===
While attending a Supertramp concert in the early 1990s, the princess wore a bracelet with black and white stones with silver diamante stars which was believed to have been purchased from the famous costume jewellery store Butler & Wilson.

=== Two-stoned gold cuff bracelet ===
During an official engagement at the Lord Gage Centre for Old People, a nursing home run by The Guinness Partnership, in 1990, the princess wore a gold cuff bracelet which featured two blue stones at its centre. The piece has been worn by Diana's daughter-in-law, the Duchess of Sussex, at numerous occasions following her marriage to Prince Harry.

=== Double crescent bracelet ===
Created by Verdura back in 1944, Diana was seen wearing the bracelet during the auction of her outfits in New York in 1997. The piece is made out of "18k gold and platinum set with 137 round diamonds", and its "interlocking Cs derive from the cipher of Diana, Roman goddess of the hunt". The princess also wore a pair of earrings at the event, known as Diana Earclips and made out of "mabé pearl, diamond, platinum and 18k yellow gold".

=== Bulgari bracelet ===
On 31 August 1997, the princess was wearing a Bulgari seed pearl bracelet that was held at each end with diamond encrusted dragons which were given to her by Dodi Fayed. It was last worn by the princess on the day of her death and subsequently became one of the 14 personal effects recovered from the crash scene. It is said that due to the impact of the collision the bracelet broke "scattered on the back seat and floor", what was recovered of the bracelet, in part, was "6 white pearls".

=== Gold Jaeger-Lecoultre watch ===
One of the princess' favourite watches, she had worn it (or one similar) for years as early as 1991. It was last worn by the princess on the day of her death and subsequently became one of the 14 personal effects recovered from the crash scene.

== Suites ==
=== Sultan of Oman diamond and sapphire suite ===
During her 1986 visit to Oman, Diana was given a set of crescent-shaped geometric diamond and sapphire necklace, earrings, and bracelet by the Sultan of Oman. The princess famously wore the set together with the Spencer Tiara during a state visit to Germany in 1987.

=== Bulgari suite ===
During the final months of the princess's life, she received many pieces of jewellery as gifts from Dodi Fayed. She received a necklace, a pair of earrings, a bracelet, a brooch and a watch which were all matching. She also received a Bulgari yellow gold and diamond band which she called a "friendship ring".

=== The Saudi sapphire suite ===
As a wedding present, the Crown Prince of Saudi Arabia gave the princess a suite of jewellery. It consisted of a Burmese sapphire and diamond pendant suspended on a baguette diamond tennis necklace (which also later suspended 'The Prince of Wales feathers diamond pendant'), matching earrings, matching ring, a two-row bracelet of brilliant-cut diamonds with a similar version of the sapphire pendant and a watch with the face set in the same diamond sunray fringe as the pendant and the strap consists of seven oval sapphires see in clusters of diamonds. The entire suite was all made by Asprey and gifted to the princess in a green malachite box decorated with a palm tree and crossed swords. The princess would often wear the necklace, earrings and occasionally the bracelet. She used the stones from the watch and ring to make new pieces of jewellery.

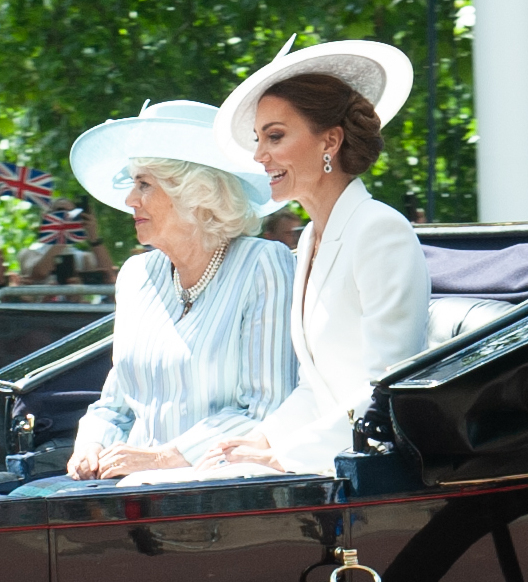
The Duchess of Cambridge (right) wearing the double drop sapphire earrings at the 2022 Trooping the Colour

Four of the sapphire and diamond clusters from the watch strap were used to create a pair of earrings, with two clusters as detachable pendant drops. Diana wore these sapphire earrings both in the form of double drop earrings and studs. The piece has now been passed to her daughter-in-law, the Duchess of Cambridge, who wore them at the 2022 Trooping the Colour.

The central sapphire from the ring was set in the diamond sunray frame of the watch, replacing the watch face and became the centrepiece of a wide choker of midnight-blue velvet backed with Velcro. On either side of the sapphire is a chain of small diamonds, three deep, which runs halfway round the choker. The princess wore the choker as a headband on her official visit to Japan in 1986, at a State banquet hosted by Emperor Hirohito.

=== Butterfly earrings and necklace ===
During an official visit to Canada in 1986, the princess wore a set of gold necklace and earrings. The earrings had the shape of a butterfly, and the necklace also had a piece of golden butterfly in its centre. The set was passed to the princess's younger son who gave it to his wife. Diana's daughter-in-law, the Duchess of Sussex, wore the earrings during her visit to Australia and on the day her pregnancy was announced.

=== Collingwood diamond girandole suite ===
Similar to the Princess' Swan Lake suite, the Collingwood diamond girandole suite was another set of jewellery only worn by the princess and not owned. The Collingwood jewellers were the jewellers favoured by the Spencer family and thus loaned Lady Diana Spencer a pair of diamond earrings and matching necklace to be worn for her official engagement photographs taken by Lord Snowdon at Highgrove House in 1981. Collingwood initially planned on giving her the set as a wedding gift however it was deemed "inappropriate" by palace officials. The jewellers presented the princess with a pair of diamond and pearl earrings instead which were often worn by the princess. The Collingwood diamond suite subsequently was sold by an Iranian jeweller in Dusseldorf, Genio Hakimi, who claimed they were Spencer heirlooms that had been sold to pay for the wedding, using the photographs as proof.

== See also ==
- Crown Jewels of the United Kingdom
- Jewels of Elizabeth II
