= Maurice Roche =

Maurice Roche may refer to:

- Maurice Roche, 4th Baron Fermoy (1885–1955), British politician
- Maurice Roche, 6th Baron Fermoy (born 1967), British businessman
- Maurice Roche, 8th Viscount Fermoy (1593–1670), Irish magnate, soldier, and politician
