= West Heath School =

West Heath School may refer to:

- West Heath Girls' School (1865–1997), a girls' boarding school in Kent, England
- West Heath School (special school) (1998–), a special school in Kent, England
