= Edmund Roche =

Edmund or Edmond Roche may refer to:

- Edmund Roche (Sinn Féin politician), elected to the Dáil Éireann
- Edmond Roche, 1st Baron Fermoy, Irish politician in the British parliament
- Edmund Roche, 5th Baron Fermoy, British businessman
- Edmond Roche (poet), French poet, playwright, librettist and violinist
