= Lady Sarah McCorquodale =

British noble; sister of Diana, Princess of Wales (born 1955)

- Born: Elizabeth Sarah Lavinia Spencer; 19 March 1955 (age 71); Park House, Sandringham, Norfolk, England
- Spouse: Neil Edmund McCorquodale (m. 1980)
- Children: 3
- Parent(s): John Spencer, 8th Earl Spencer; Frances Shand Kydd
- Relatives: Lady Jane Fellowes (sister); Diana, Princess of Wales (sister); Charles Spencer, 9th Earl Spencer (brother)
- Family: Spencer

Lady Elizabeth Sarah Lavinia McCorquodale (née Spencer; born 19 March 1955) is one of the two older sisters of Diana, Princess of Wales, the other being Lady Jane Fellowes. For a short period of time, she dated Prince Charles before introducing him to her sister Diana.

== Early life ==
Elizabeth Sarah Lavinia Spencer was born with the honorific "The Honourable" at Park House, Sandringham; she acquired the courtesy title "Lady" in 1975, when her grandfather died and her father became the 8th Earl Spencer. She suffered from the eating disorder anorexia nervosa in her early twenties. She was educated first at Riddlesworth Hall School in Norfolk and, secondly, at West Heath boarding school near Sevenoaks in Kent. After finishing school, she went to work in London.

== Family ==
Sarah married Neil Edmund McCorquodale, son of Alastair McCorquodale and Rosemary Sybil Turnor, on 17 May 1980 in Northamptonshire, England. Neil is a second cousin once removed of Lady Sarah's stepmother, Raine Spencer. Neil is also half fourth cousin to Lady Sarah through the Pagets and the Curzons.

Neil and Lady Sarah have three children:

- Emily Jane McCorquodale (2 July 1983); she married James T. R. Hutt on 9 June 2012. They have two children.
- George Edmund McCorquodale (17 November 1984); he married Bianca Moore, daughter of Gavin Moore, on 6 August 2016 in South Africa. They have three children.
- Celia Rose McCorquodale (1989); she married George Woodhouse on 16 June 2018 at St Andrew and St Mary's Church, Stoke Rochford, Lincolnshire, England. For her wedding, Celia wore the Spencer Tiara, which her mother and aunts Jane and Diana wore on their wedding days. They have two children.

Lady Sarah is the aunt of William, Prince of Wales, and Prince Harry, Duke of Sussex.

== Career ==
She and her family reside near Grantham, Lincolnshire, where she served a one-year term as High Sheriff of Lincolnshire in 2009. She became a master of the Belvoir Hunt in May 2010. Lady Sarah was also president of the Diana, Princess of Wales Memorial Fund, which raised over £112 million for various charities, before closing in 2012. The Fund unsuccessfully took legal action in 1998 against the Franklin Mint over the unlicensed use of Diana's image.

== Relationships ==
=== Charles, Prince of Wales ===
In 1977, Lady Sarah's relationship with Prince Charles led to the first meeting between Diana and her future husband. Lady Sarah later commented on her sister's marriage, saying: "I introduced them. I'm Cupid." During the period in which Lady Sarah dated the Prince, she allegedly met two reporters, James Whittaker and Nigel Nelson, at a restaurant, and gave them an exclusive report on her royal connection.

Lady Sarah is said to have admitted to having been diagnosed with anorexia, having "thousands of boyfriends," a past problem involving alcohol, and having started keeping a scrapbook of all the press clippings about her royal romance that she intended to show future grandchildren. "Her head seemed to be turned by the publicity," the two reporters later said. Lady Sarah also declared that she would not marry Charles "if he were the dustman or the King of England." When the article was released, Lady Sarah showed it to the prince, who was infuriated by it. The relationship dissolved soon after that. Some have stated the relationship between her and Diana was strained, because of her long resentment of the Prince marrying Diana and not her, though others (including Diana's biographer Andrew Morton) have said Lady Sarah was one of the few people Diana trusted. Later in their lives, Lady Sarah often accompanied Diana on official visits as one of her ladies-in-waiting.

After the death of Diana on 31 August 1997, Lady Sarah flew to Paris with her younger sister, Jane, and Prince Charles to accompany Diana's body back to England. She contributed to the readings at Diana's funeral. Lady Sarah was also co-executor of Diana's will and president of the Diana, Princess of Wales Memorial Fund. Lady Sarah attended the wedding of her nephew Prince William to Catherine Middleton on 29 April 2011. It is said that William and Catherine are close to Lady Sarah, with whom they spent a weekend on the 16th anniversary of Diana's death. Lady Sarah also attended the wedding of Prince Harry to Meghan Markle on 19 May 2018.

=== George Grant huntmaster incident ===
In 2018, Lady Sarah spoke publicly in support of George Grant, an employee of the Belvoir Hunt whom she had known for 27 years, after he assaulted two hunt monitors. Grant, along with his son and other men, assaulted the hunt monitors who were affiliated with the League Against Cruel Sports. Lady Sarah, who served as joint master of the Belvoir Hunt, claimed that Grant's actions were out of character.

== Health ==
In September 2025, McCorquodale was hospitalised after a fall while horse riding.
