= John Spencer, 8th Earl Spencer =

Father of Diana, Princess of Wales (1924–1992)

The Right Honourable The Earl Spencer LVO
- Spencer in 1967
- Born: Edward John Spencer; 24 January 1924; Paddington, London, England
- Died: 29 March 1992 (aged 68); St John's Wood, London, England
- Buried: Ashes interred in the Church of St Mary the Virgin, Great Brington
- Noble family: Spencer
- Spouses: Frances Roche (m. 1954; div. 1969); Raine, Countess of Dartmouth (m. 1976)
- Issue: Lady Sarah McCorquodale; Lady Jane Fellowes; John Spencer; Diana, Princess of Wales; Charles Spencer, 9th Earl Spencer
- Parents: Albert Spencer, 7th Earl Spencer; Lady Cynthia Hamilton
- Military career
- Allegiance: United Kingdom
- Branch: British Army; Royal Scots Greys
- Service years: 1944–1945
- Rank: Captain
- Conflicts: World War II

Edward John Spencer, 8th Earl Spencer (24 January 1924 – 29 March 1992), styled Viscount Althorp until June 1975, was a British peer, military officer, and courtier. He was the father of Diana, Princess of Wales, and the maternal grandfather of William, Prince of Wales, and Prince Harry, Duke of Sussex.

== Early life, education and military career ==
Lord Spencer was born Edward John Spencer, Viscount Althorp, the only son and younger child of Albert Spencer, 7th Earl Spencer, and his wife the former Lady Cynthia Hamilton, second daughter of the 3rd Duke of Abercorn. He was born on 24 January 1924 in their family home at 24 Sussex Square, Bayswater, London. He was educated at Eton, the Royal Military College at Sandhurst, and the Royal Agricultural College. Popularly known to his family and friends as Johnnie Althorp, he served as a captain in the Royal Scots Greys from 1944 to 1945, and was Mentioned in Dispatches. He landed in France the day after D-Day. He led a British Army unit in an operation to liberate two French towns, La Neuve-Lyre and La Vieille-Lyre. From 1947 to 1950, he served as Aide-de-Camp to His Excellency Lieutenant-General Sir Willoughby Norrie, then Governor of South Australia.

He was engaged to 1950's debutante of the year, Lady Anne Coke (later Anne Tennant, Baroness Glenconner, lady-in-waiting to Princess Margaret). His father objected to the match on the grounds of "mad blood", a reference to the institutionalised relatives of the Queen, and the engagement was broken off. Much later, the director of the Murdoch Children's Research Institute thought that a genetic disease in the Hepburn-Stuart-Forbes-Trefusis family may have killed male members of the family in early childhood and caused learning disabilities in females.

Spencer held the offices of County Councillor for Northamptonshire (1952), High Sheriff of Northamptonshire (1959) and Justice of the Peace for Norfolk (1970). He served as equerry to King George VI (1950–52) and to Queen Elizabeth II (1952–54), and was invested as a Member (fourth class) of the Royal Victorian Order (MVO) in 1954. Prior to 1984, the grades of Lieutenant and Member were classified as Members (fourth class) and Members (fifth class), respectively, but both with the post-nominals MVO. He was known by the courtesy title Viscount Althorp until 1975 when he became the 8th Earl Spencer upon his father's death. He was Member of the House of Lords from 9 June 1975 (the day his father died and he inherited the peerage) until his own death.

== Personal life and death ==
On 1 June 1954 Spencer and the Hon. Frances Ruth Roche, the younger daughter of the 4th Baron Fermoy, were married in Westminster Abbey by Percy Herbert, Bishop of Norwich. Queen Elizabeth II and other members of the royal family attended the wedding ceremony. They had five children:

- Lady Elizabeth Sarah Lavinia Spencer (born 19 March 1955), goddaughter of Queen Elizabeth the Queen Mother, married Neil Edmund McCorquodale on 17 May 1980 and had issue
- Lady Cynthia Jane Spencer (born 11 February 1957), goddaughter of Prince Edward, Duke of Kent, married Robert Fellowes, Baron Fellowes, on 20 April 1978 and had issue
- Hon. John Spencer (12 January 1960 – 12 January 1960), died within ten hours of his birth at Park House, Sandringham.
- Lady Diana Frances Spencer (1 July 1961 – 31 August 1997), married to Charles, Prince of Wales (later Charles III), from 1981 to 1996 and had issue
- Charles Edward Maurice Spencer, 9th Earl Spencer (born 20 May 1964), godson of Queen Elizabeth II, married first to Victoria Lockwood from 1989 to 1997 and had issue, married second to Caroline Hutton from 2001 to 2007 and had issue, married third to Karen Villeneuve from 2011 to 2025 and had issue, and married fourth to Cat Jarman in 2026

According to author Penny Junor "Johnny could be violent, and [Frances] felt she and her children would be safer out of the home". Their daughter Diana also recalled "seeing my father slap my mother across the face and I was hiding behind the door and she was crying".

The marriage was not a happy one, and in 1967, Frances left John to be with Peter Shand Kydd, an heir to a wallpaper fortune in Australia, whom she had met the year before. Frances lived with Diana and Charles in London during the separation, but during that year's Christmas holidays, Viscount Althorp refused to let his children return to London with their mother. John and Frances Spencer were divorced in 1969. Immediately thereafter, Frances married Peter Shand Kydd and John was granted custody of their children by the courts after his former mother-in-law, Ruth Roche, Baroness Fermoy, testified against her own daughter. In 1976, Lord Spencer married Raine McCorquodale, the former wife of the 9th Earl of Dartmouth and daughter of Captain Alexander McCorquodale, a British Army officer, and the romantic novelist Dame Barbara Cartland.

In 1978, Spencer suffered a severe stroke, from which, at one stage, he was not expected to recover, and which kept him in hospital for eight months. Shortly before his death, he was hospitalised for pneumonia. He died of a heart attack in 1992, and was succeeded by his only surviving son, Charles. His funeral was held at the Church of St Mary the Virgin, Great Brington, and his ashes were interred in the family vault beneath the Spencer chapel.

== Coat of arms ==
Coat of arms of John Spencer, 8th Earl Spencer
Coronet A Coronet of an Earl Crest Out of a Ducal Coronet Or a Griffin's Head Azure gorged with a Bar Gemelle Gules between two Wings expanded of the second Escutcheon Quarterly Argent and Gules in the 2nd and 3rd quarters a Fret Or over all on a Bend Sable three Escallops of the first Supporters Dexter: A Griffin per fess Ermine and Erminois gorged with a Collar Sable the edges flory-counterflory and chained of the last and on the Collar three Escallops Argent; Sinister: A Wyvern Erect on his tail Ermine similarly collared and chained Motto Dieu Defend Le Droit (God defend the right)

Honorary titles
Preceded by Sir Gyles Isham, Bt	High Sheriff of Northamptonshire; 1959	Succeeded by Evelyn Fanshawe
Peerage of Great Britain
Preceded by Albert Spencer	Earl Spencer; 9 June 1975 – 29 March 1992	Succeeded by Charles Spencer
