= Maxine Riddington =

British writer

Maxine Riddington, commonly known as Max Riddington, is a journalist and author. Her books are co-authored with Gavan Naden.

== Books published ==
Frances: The Remarkable Story Of Princess Diana's Mother is a biography of the Hon. Frances Shand Kydd, the mother of Diana, Princess of Wales. The book is "based on exclusive interviews with Frances Shand Kydd and...is a compelling narrative of a life lived to the full." It was published in 2003 in the UK by Michael O'Mara Books Ltd.

The Lilac Days is the story of a secret love affair between the grandfather of Diana, Princess of Wales, Lord Fermoy, and an American woman, Edith Travis. This account reveals the hundreds of love letters sent across the Atlantic, giving insight into an impossible affair. It was published in 2005 in the UK by Harpercollins Pub Ltd.

Burrough Hill Lad - The Making Of A Champion Racehorse is the inspiring story of how one man and his magnificent horse rose from an impoverished background to take on the wealthy world of horse racing and win. It explores the life of Stan Riley and the rise of his champion racehorse, who in 1984 won the Cheltenham Gold Cup, Hennessy Gold Cup and King George VI Chase, and saw Burrough Hill Lad rated one of the best horses in the history of the sport. In 2015, Burrough Hill Lad - The Making Of A Champion Racehorse was shortlisted for the Cross British Sports Book Of The Year Award.

== See also ==
- Frances Shand Kydd
- Diana, Princess of Wales
- Maurice Roche, 4th Baron Fermoy
- Michael O'Mara Books
