= Prince Alexander John of Wales =

British prince (1871)

Prince Alexander John
- Born: 6 April 1871; Sandringham House, Norfolk, England
- Died: 7 April 1871 (aged 1 day); Sandringham House, Norfolk, England
- Cause of death: Premature birth
- Burial: 11 April 1871; St Mary Magdalene Church, Sandringham
Names
- Alexander John Charles Albert
- House: Saxe-Coburg and Gotha
- Father: Albert Edward, Prince of Wales (later Edward VII)
- Mother: Alexandra of Denmark

Prince Alexander John of Wales (Alexander John Charles Albert; 6 April 1871 – 7 April 1871) was the youngest child of Albert Edward, Prince of Wales (later Edward VII) and Alexandra of Denmark. He was born prematurely at Sandringham House in Norfolk and died less than 24 hours after birth; he was buried at St Mary Magdalene Church, Sandringham. News of the royal birth and the prince's short life attracted media coverage around the world.

== Pregnancy ==
Princess Alexandra suffered greatly throughout her pregnancy; she was often exhausted and experienced "irregular bleeding". Six months into the pregnancy she became depressed and, while ice skating, fell and hit her knee, causing her mouth to fill with blood. Seven months into the pregnancy she fell again while exiting a carriage at the wedding of Princess Louise and John Campbell. The family left Marlborough House on 4 April 1871, having planned to spend Easter at Sandringham.

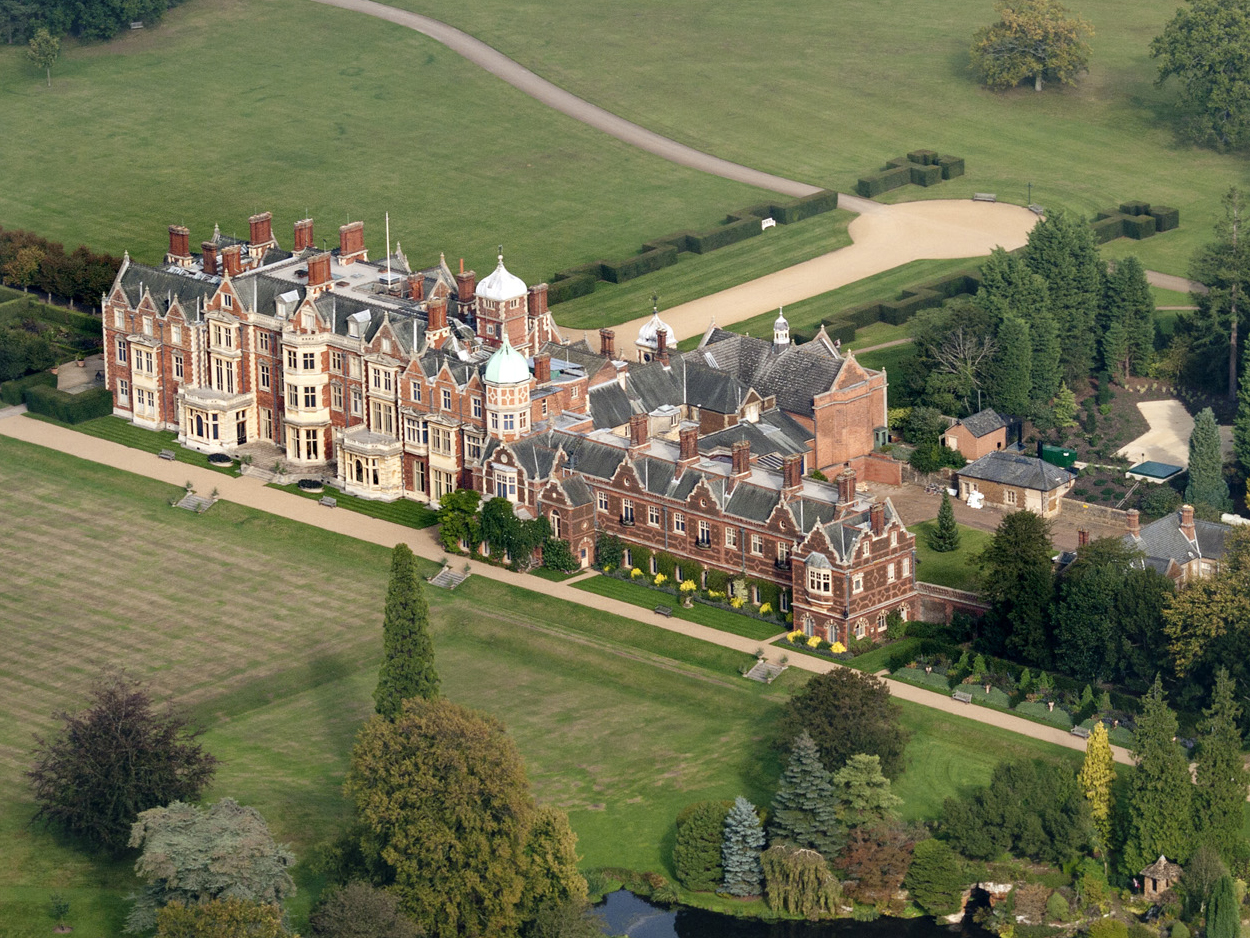
Sandringham House where Alexander John was born

== Birth ==
Alexander John was born six weeks prematurely at 2:45 pm on 6 April 1871, the youngest child of Albert Edward, Prince of Wales (later King Edward VII), and his wife, Alexandra of Denmark, at Sandringham House in Sandringham, Norfolk. Early that morning Alexandra awoke with pains, and at 6:40 am it was realised she was going into labour. As the baby was not expected until June, no clothes were ready, and the family physician, Dr Arthur Farre, did not arrive in time. The local doctor, William Jasper Rendell of King's Lynn, delivered the baby with the monthly nurse, Mrs Clarke.

The baby was born easily but exceedingly small and feeble; his father deemed him "very ugly" but was told this was because he was born facing downward and would have no lasting effect. A telegram was sent to Queen Victoria at Osborne House and she wrote in her personal diary later that day:

The baby rather weak, which makes me rather anxious about it.

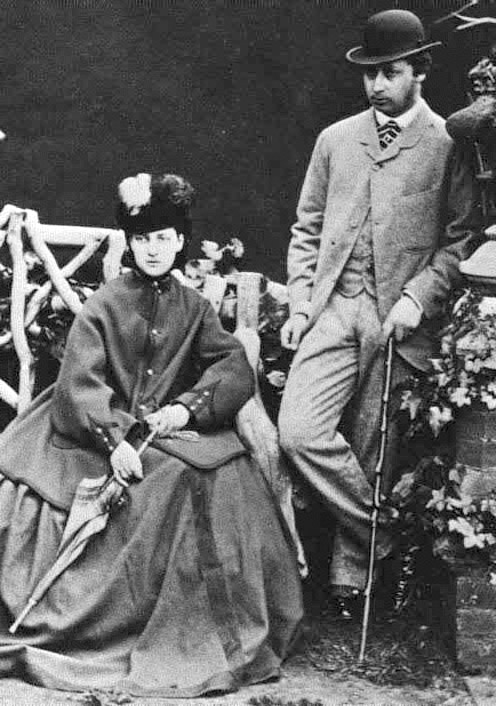
Princess Alexandra of Denmark and the Prince of Wales, 1863

As his condition deteriorated, he was christened hastily at 8 pm on 6 April at Alexandra's bedside by the rector of Sandringham and chaplain to Albert Edward, Rev William Lake Onslow. The ceremony was attended only by his parents, the Hon. Mrs Stonor (a lady in waiting), and Dr Farre. He was christened Alexander John Charles Albert.

As part of the celebratory announcement of his birth, guns were fired at Hyde Park and the Tower of London, and notices were placed in newspapers around the country. On 7 April, Victoria wrote that she had received messages from Albert Edward explaining that "the baby was exceedingly feeble and there was little hope of its surviving." The next morning the child appeared blue, and it was clear he would not live much longer. By the afternoon his condition had worsened, and he died at roughly 2 pm on 7 April, less than 24 hours after birth. Queen Victoria wrote:

Our poor little child had been taken from us.

== Funeral and burial ==
Alexandra, whose health remained steady, lay with the child, crying and holding his hand until 8 pm. A sample of the Prince's hair was taken, and the items were added to a locket given to his father in December 1871. He was dressed in burial attire before being placed in a mahogany coffin with silver ornaments, lined with white satin and decorated with white flowers, camellias and banksia roses. A quilt on the coffin depicted spring flowers rather than dust and ashes.

The funeral procession left the house at 1 pm, walking towards St Mary Magdalene Church, Sandringham in the following order:
Revs. Gerald Wellesley and William Lake Onslow, Revs. W. W. Dickinson and E. Schofield,
Dr Farre and Mr. T. M. Kendall, surgeon,
The coffin,
The Prince of Wales and his two sons, Prince Albert Victor and Prince George (later King George V), wearing grey kilts, crêpe scarves, and black gloves,
General Knollys, General Grey, other members of the household, Mr. E. Beck, and the tenantry of the estate.

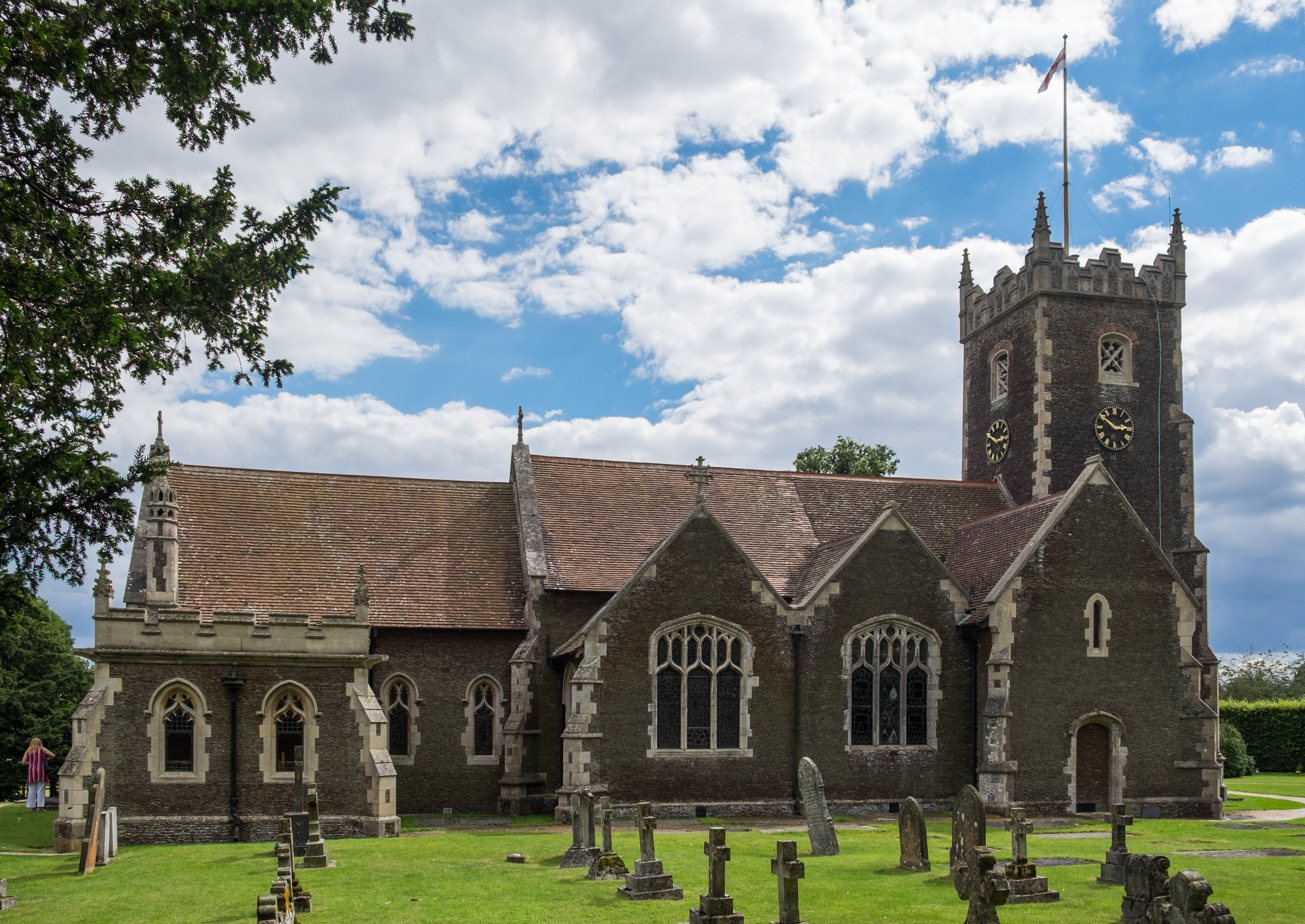
The church at Sandringham where Alexander John was buried

They walked through the park and to the church, where Alexandra watched from a window, crying alone. A service was led by the dean of Windsor, Gerald Wellesley, while the Prince of Wales cried throughout. The burial took place in a quiet service lasting one hour on 11 April, in the churchyard at the east side of the church opposite the chancel windows. The rector of Sandringham, Rev William Lake Onslow, officiated. The location was chosen so it could be seen from the windows of Sandringham House. White wreaths were laid by the Prince of Wales, Albert Victor, and George before the coffin was lowered, with primroses and anemones thrown onto it.

The inscription on the coffin plate reads:

Alexander John Charles Albert,
Third son of
Albert Edward Prince of Wales, and Alexandra
Princess of Wales.
Born April 6, died April 7 1871.

Queen Victoria offered to visit the family, but the Prince of Wales declined so that Alexandra could rest. Alexandra added that she wished the queen's first visit to Sandringham to be one of "joy, not sorrow." The Princess of Wales blamed herself for the child's death, but she was assured she played no role in it.

== Legacy ==
Despite Alexandra's pleas for privacy, Queen Victoria insisted on a ten-day period of court mourning, which led elements of the republican press to criticise the monarchy, describing the birth as "a wretched abortion" and the funeral arrangements as "sickening mummery". The infant was not buried in state at Windsor but privately at Sandringham. During the mourning period women were expected to wear "black silk dresses trimmed with crape, black shoes and gloves, black fans, feathers and ornaments", while men were expected to wear "black court dress with black swords, buckles and plain linen".

On the 11th anniversary of Alexander John's birth, on 6 April 1882, Alexandra wrote to George: "it is sad to think that nothing remains on earth to remind us of him but his little grave."

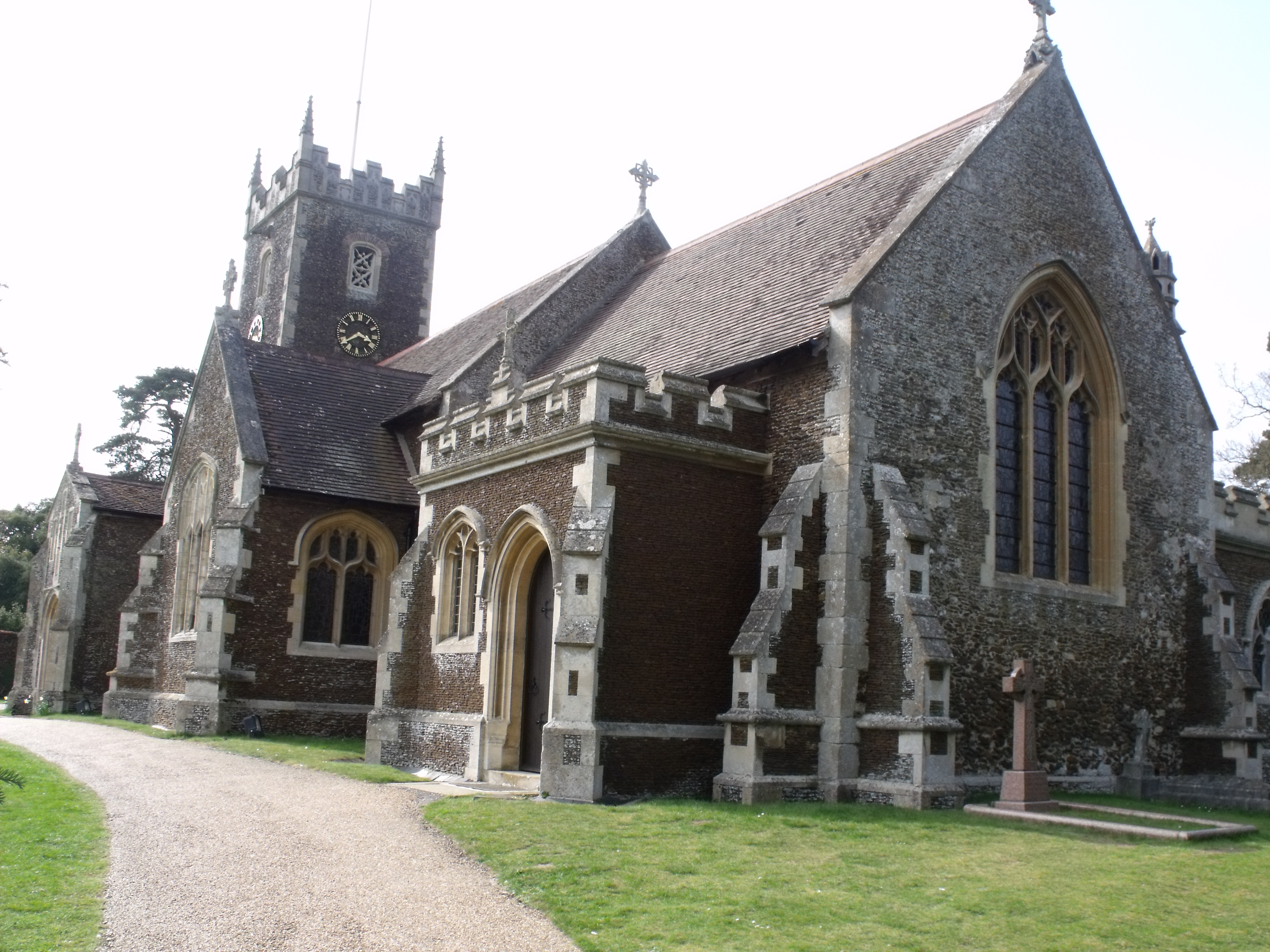
Alexander John's burial site (bottom right)

Later in 1919, his nephew Prince John, son of George V, was buried beside him. The king wrote in his diary: "Dear little Johnnie had been brought last night and we laid him to rest in the churchyard next to brother John." Queen Mary wrote that "now our two darling Johnnies lie side by side."

== Titles ==
During the prince's short life, his royal title was: His Royal Highness Prince Alexander John of Wales

== Ancestry ==
Ancestors of Prince Alexander John of Wales

8. Ernest I of Saxe-Coburg and Gotha
4. Prince Albert of Saxe-Coburg and Gotha
9. Princess Louise of Saxe-Gotha-Altenburg
2. Edward VII of the United Kingdom
10. Prince Edward, Duke of Kent and Strathearn
5. Queen Victoria of the United Kingdom
11. Princess Victoria of Saxe-Coburg-Saalfeld
1. Prince Alexander John of Wales
12. Frederick William, Duke of Schleswig-Holstein-Sonderburg-Glücksburg
6. Christian IX of Denmark
13. Princess Louise Caroline of Hesse-Kassel
3. Princess Alexandra of Denmark
14. Prince William of Hesse-Kassel
7. Princess Louise of Hesse-Kassel
15. Princess Charlotte of Denmark
