= Ruth Roche, Baroness Fermoy =

British lady-in-waiting and baroness (1908–1993)

The Right Honourable The Lady Fermoy DCVO OBE
- Born: Ruth Sylvia Gill; 2 October 1908; Bieldside, Aberdeenshire, Scotland
- Died: 6 July 1993 (aged 84); Belgravia, London, England
- Education: Paris Conservatoire
- Occupation: Woman of the Bedchamber to Queen Elizabeth the Queen Mother
- Known for: Maternal grandmother of Diana, Princess of Wales
- Spouse: Maurice Roche, 4th Baron Fermoy (m. 1931; died 1955)
- Children: 3, including Frances Shand Kydd and Edmund Roche, 5th Baron Fermoy
- Relatives: Diana, Princess of Wales (granddaughter)

Ruth Sylvia Roche, Baroness Fermoy (née Gill; 2 October 1908 – 6 July 1993) was a friend and confidante of Queen Elizabeth the Queen Mother and the maternal grandmother of Diana, Princess of Wales. She was one of the Queen Mother's ladies-in-waiting.

== Biography ==
Lady Fermoy was born Ruth Sylvia Gill at Dalhebity House, Bieldside, Aberdeenshire, daughter of Colonel William Smith Gill and Ruth (née Littlejohn, daughter of David Littlejohn, DL). She showed early promise as a pianist and studied under Alfred Cortot at the Paris Conservatoire in the 1920s.

Her musical career was cut short when she met the wealthy and much older Maurice Roche, 4th Baron Fermoy. They married on 17 September 1931 at St. Devenick's Church in Bieldside, Aberdeenshire. Lord and Lady Fermoy had three children: Mary Cynthia, Frances Ruth, and Edmund James Burke. Her daughter Frances later became the mother of Diana, Princess of Wales.

Lady Fermoy did play the piano in public occasionally after her marriage, most notably with Josef Krips at the Royal Albert Hall in 1950, and with Sir John Barbirolli and the Hallé Orchestra at King's Lynn in 1966. She founded the King's Lynn Festival in 1951 and remained closely involved with the Festival for 25 years, persuading Queen Elizabeth the Queen Mother to become its patron. She was appointed an Officer of the Order of the British Empire (OBE) in January 1952 for her services as Chairman of the King's Lynn Arts Festival Society.

In 1956, the Queen Mother appointed Lady Fermoy an Extra Woman of the Bedchamber. The Queen Mother, being a widow herself, showed a preference for appointing widows to her household, and four years later, Lady Fermoy was promoted to Woman of the Bedchamber, a post she held for the next 33 years. She was appointed a Commander of the Royal Victorian Order in June 1966, and a Dame Commander of the Royal Victorian Order in June 1979.

Lady Fermoy was a firm believer in the sanctity of marriage. In 1969, her daughter Frances and John Spencer, Viscount Althorp, divorced after Frances left her husband for Peter Shand Kydd. Lady Fermoy testified against her daughter, which allowed Viscount Althorp to retain custody of their children.

The Queen Mother and Lady Fermoy became confidantes, and it was assumed by many that the two women engineered the match between their grandchildren, Charles, Prince of Wales, and Lady Diana Spencer. However, when asked about it, Lady Fermoy remarked: "You can say that if you like – but it simply wouldn't be true". She was also said to have counselled her granddaughter against the marriage, saying: "Darling, you must understand that their sense of humour and their lifestyle are different, and I don't think it will suit you."

Lady Fermoy died at her home at 36 Eaton Square, London, on 6 July 1993, aged 84. It was reported that she was not on speaking terms with Diana when she died.

== Ancestry ==
Lady Fermoy's great-grandmother, Kitty Forbes, was the daughter of Eliza Kewark. Eliza's father, Hakob Kevork or Kevorkian, was Armenian; her Indian mother was probably Muslim. She is variously described in contemporary documents as "a dark-skinned native woman" and "an Armenian woman from Bombay".

== Popular culture ==
Lady Fermoy was portrayed by Georgie Glen in the fourth season of The Crown.
