= Maurice Roche, 4th Baron Fermoy =

British politician (1885–1955)

The Right Honourable The Lord Fermoy
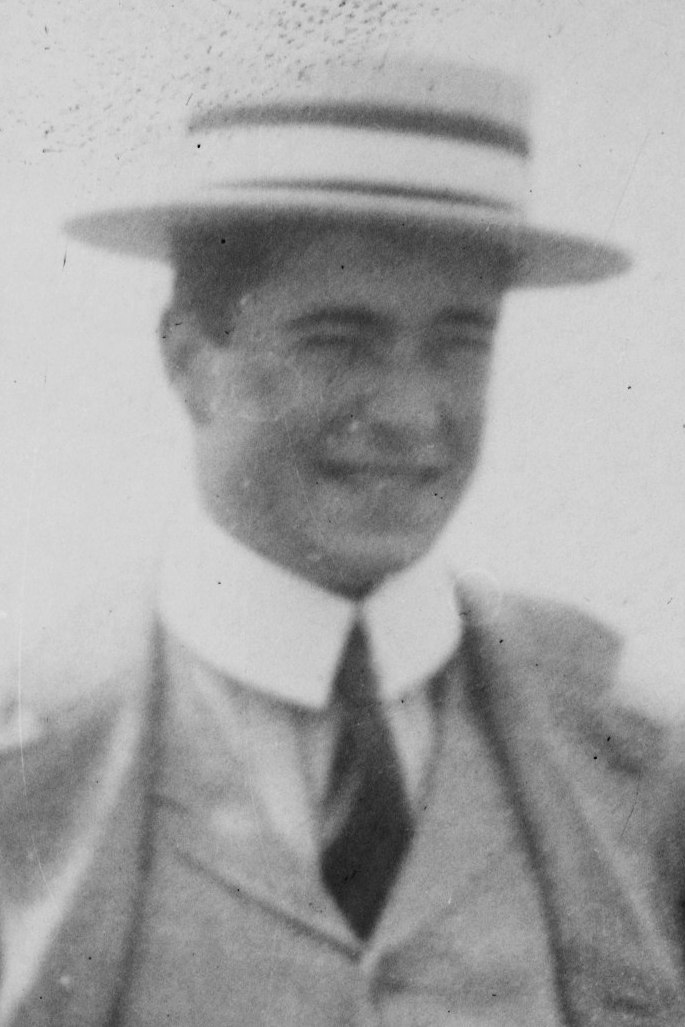
- Fermoy in the 1910s

Member of Parliament for King's Lynn
- In office 1943–1945
- Preceded by: Somerset Maxwell
- Succeeded by: Frederick Wise
- In office 1924–1935
- Preceded by: George Woodwark
- Succeeded by: Somerset Maxwell

Personal details
- Born: Edmund Maurice Burke Roche; 15 May 1885 London, England
- Died: 8 July 1955 (aged 70) Norfolk, England
- Spouse: Ruth Sylvia Gill (m. 1931)
- Children: 3, including Frances Shand Kydd and Edmund Roche, 5th Baron Fermoy
- Parents: James Roche, 3rd Baron Fermoy; Frances Ellen Work
- Relatives: Diana, Princess of Wales (granddaughter)
- Education: Harvard University
- Known for: Maternal grandfather of Diana, Princess of Wales

Edmund Maurice Burke Roche, 4th Baron Fermoy (15 May 1885 – 8 July 1955) was a British Conservative Party politician and peer in the Peerage of Ireland. He served as Member of Parliament for King's Lynn from 1924 to 1935 and again from 1943 to 1945. Roche was the maternal grandfather of Diana, Princess of Wales, through his daughter Frances Shand Kydd, and the husband of Ruth Roche, Baroness Fermoy, a confidante of Queen Elizabeth the Queen Mother.

== Early life ==
Edmund Maurice Burke Roche was born on 15 May 1885 in Chelsea, London. He was the elder of twin sons of the Hon. James Roche (later 3rd Baron Fermoy) and Frances Ellen Work. The Roches separated in December 1886, and divorced in 1891, with James Roche agreeing to relinquish custody of his sons to his wife's father, multi-millionaire stockbroker Frank Work, in exchange for Work paying Roche's debts. From his parents' marriage, he had an elder sister, Cynthia Roche (who married Arthur Scott Burden and, after his death, Guy Fairfax Cary).

He was educated at Harvard University and graduated in 1909. As a condition of their inheritance, Work stipulated that Maurice and his twin brother Francis "shall assume and retain the name 'Work' in place of the name 'Roche'", and must not travel to Europe or marry a European; Maurice ignored the edicts. Accounts of his grandfather's estate filed in the New York County Surrogate's Court during November 1912 recorded that Maurice inherited $2,716,000 from his grandfather.

Roche returned to England on succeeding to his father's Irish peerage in 1920. He was a naturalized American citizen, but resumed British nationality following his succession to the title.

== Career ==
He rented Park House at Sandringham, Norfolk, from the royal family. At the 1924 general election, he contested and won the local parliamentary constituency, King's Lynn, holding the seat until he stood down at the 1935 general election. He was also elected the town's mayor in 1931.

=== Later life ===
Lord Fermoy joined the Royal Air Force in 1939 at the start of World War II, but when the incumbent Member of Parliament (MP) for King's Lynn was killed on active service in 1943, he resigned his commission and stood for re-election. He retired from politics when Parliament was dissolved for the 1945 general election.

Lord Fermoy was a member of the shooting party organised by King George VI on 5 February 1952, on the grounds of Sandringham, which was the King's last full day alive.

== Personal life ==
On 17 September 1931, Lord Fermoy married Ruth Sylvia Gill at St. Devenick's, Bieldside, Aberdeenshire with a reception held at Dalhebity. Ruth was the youngest daughter of Ruth (née Littlejohn) Gill and Col. William Smith Gill Before his death, they were the parents of three children:

- The Hon. Mary Cynthia Roche (19 August 1934 – 3 March 2023), who married the Hon. Anthony Berry, a son of Gomer Berry, 1st Viscount Kemsley. They divorced in 1966 and she married Denis Geoghegan. They divorced in 1980 and she married Michael Gunningham. They divorced in 1989. Mary Roche later trained as a teacher.
- The Hon. Frances Ruth Roche (20 January 1936 – 3 June 2004), who married John Spencer, Viscount Althorp. One of their daughters was Diana, Princess of Wales. Frances divorced Spencer in 1969 and she later married Peter Shand Kydd.
- The Hon. Edmund James Burke Roche (20 March 1939 – 19 August 1984), later the 5th Baron Fermoy, who married Lavinia Pitman.

=== Death ===
Lord Fermoy collapsed in a shop at King's Lynn, Norfolk, in June 1955 and died three weeks later, on 8 July. He was succeeded by his only son, Edmund. Lord Fermoy is buried in the churchyard of St Mary Magdalene Church, Sandringham.

=== Legacy ===
His life was the subject of the book Lilac Days, by Gavan Naden and Maxine Riddington (HarperCollins (ISBN 0-00-719863-9)), where it was claimed he had a 30-year affair with an American, Edith Travis. His daughter Mary was the author of Call Me Maurice: The Life and Times of Lord Fermoy, 1885–1955 (2007).

Parliament of the United Kingdom
Preceded by George Woodwark	Member of Parliament for King's Lynn; 1924–1935	Succeeded by Somerset Maxwell
Preceded by Somerset Maxwell	Member of Parliament for King's Lynn; 1943–1945	Succeeded by Frederick Wise
Peerage of Ireland
Preceded by James Roche	Baron Fermoy; 1920–1955	Succeeded by Edmund Roche
