= St Mary Magdalene Church, Sandringham =

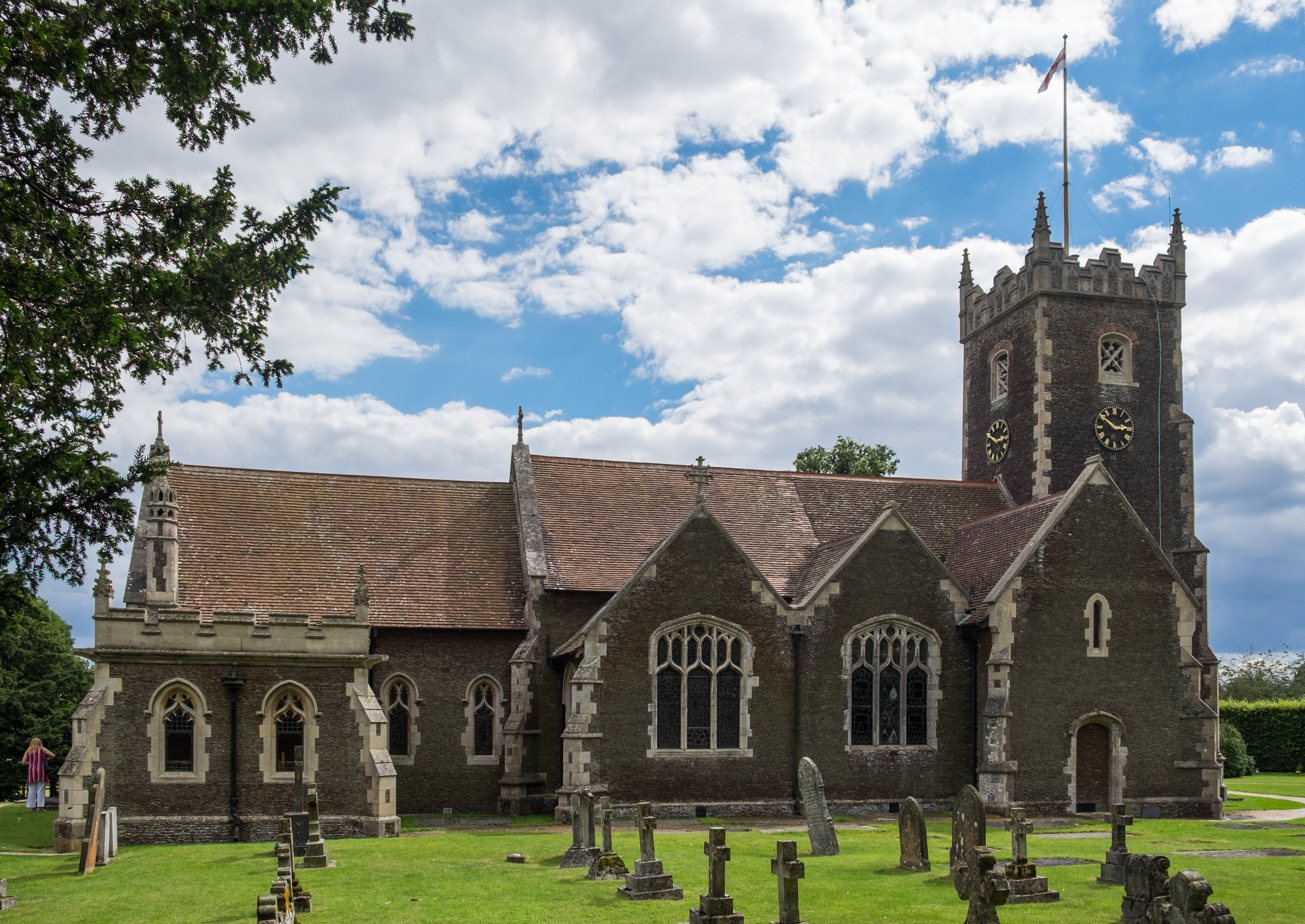

- Location in Norfolk
- 52.828204°N 0.508924°E
- OS grid reference: TF 69119 28592
- Location: Sandringham, Norfolk, PE35 6EH
- Country: England
- Denomination: Church of England
- Churchmanship: Traditional Anglican
- Website: Parish website

History
- Status: Active
- Dedication: St Mary Magdalene

Architecture
- Functional status: Parish church
- Heritage designation: Grade II* listed

Administration
- Diocese: Diocese of Norwich
- Archdeaconry: Archdeaconry of Lynn
- Deanery: Heacham and Rising
- Parish: Sandringham with West Newton and Appleton

Clergy
- Rector: Revd Canon Dr Paul Williams

St Mary Magdalene Church, Sandringham is a Church of England parish church in Norfolk, England. It is situated next to Sandringham House, and members of the British royal family regularly attend services when in residence at Sandringham, notably at Christmas. The church is dedicated to Mary Magdalene.

The church has been a place of royal worship since the reign of Queen Victoria and is noted for its ornate interior, featuring intricate wood carvings by Norwegian craftsmen. It also houses a silver altar and a pulpit presented by Queen Alexandra, reflecting its longstanding royal associations and artistic heritage.

Since 2022, the Reverend Canon Paul Williams serves as Rector of Sandringham.

== History ==
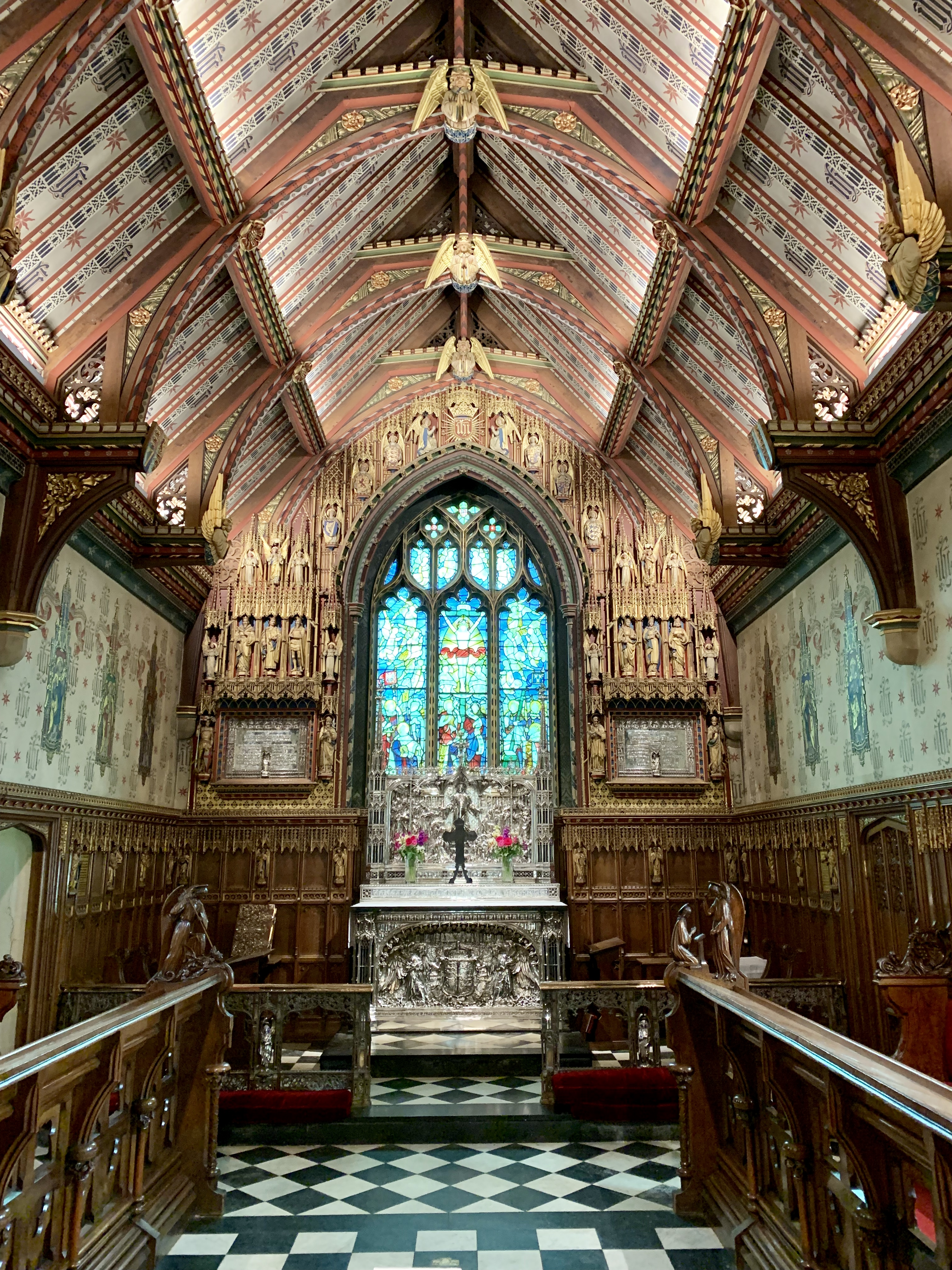
Sandringham Church chancel

The Grade II* listed church is dedicated to Mary Magdalene and is described as a small building in the perpendicular style, "nobly lying on raised ground". The present building dates from the 16th century but was restored by Samuel Sanders Teulon in 1855 and Sir Arthur Blomfield in 1890. It is considered to be a noteworthy example of a carrstone building. The church is situated in the park and is approached from Sandringham House through the garden by "an avenue of fine old Scotch firs".

Much of the decoration, including the stained glass in the east window, was designed by Charles Eamer Kempe, whom King Edward VII had also commissioned in 1903 to create a stained glass window at Buckingham Palace for his eldest son, Prince Albert, Duke of Clarence. The church's silver altar and reredos, crafted by the Parisian silversmiths Barkentin & Krall, were presented to Queen Alexandra by American department store magnate Rodman Wanamaker as a memorial tribute to Edward VII. He also presented the Queen with the silver pulpit and a silver 17th-century Spanish processional cross. Also of note are the Florentine marble font and the Greek font, dating to the 9th century.

== Burials ==
Burials in the churchyard include:

- Prince Alexander John of Wales (1871–1871)
- Prince John of the United Kingdom (1905–1919)
- Maurice Roche, 4th Baron Fermoy (1885–1955), maternal grandfather of Diana, Princess of Wales
- Edmund Roche, 5th Baron Fermoy (1939–1984), maternal uncle of Diana, Princess of Wales

Many memorials to royal family members and relations can be seen in the churchyard and at Sandringham Church.

After the death of George V in January 1936, the King's coffin lay in state overnight in the church, guarded by estate workers. On the morning of 23 January, it was taken in a 2½ mile (4-kilometre) procession from the church to Wolferton railway station, with Edward VIII and his brothers walking behind, followed by other members of the royal family in carriages.

Following the death of George VI in February 1952, the King's coffin was placed in the church for two days before being transferred to Westminster Hall to lie in state.

== Baptisms ==
Many royal baptisms have taken place at Sandringham Church, including:

- Prince Alexander John of Wales, baptised on 6 April 1871
- King George VI, baptised on 10 February 1896
- Mary, Princess Royal and Countess of Harewood, baptised on 7 June 1897
- King Olav V of Norway, baptised on 11 August 1903
- Prince John, baptised on 3 August 1905
- Diana, Princess of Wales, baptised on 30 August 1961
- Princess Eugenie, baptised on 23 December 1990
- Princess Charlotte of Wales, baptised on 5 July 2015
