= Baron Fermoy =

Title in the Peerage of Ireland

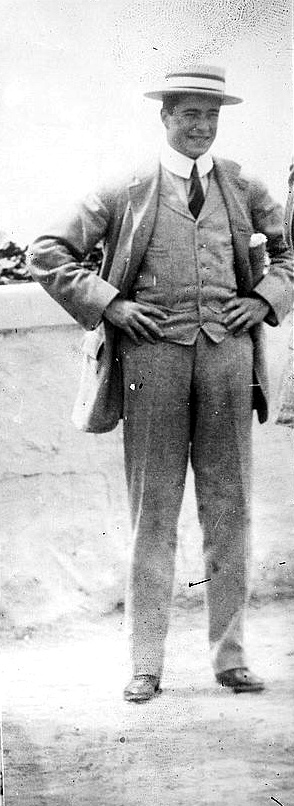
The 4th Baron Fermoy

Baron Fermoy is a title in the Peerage of Ireland. The title was created by Queen Victoria by letters patent of 10 September 1856 for Edmond Roche.

Previous letters patent had been issued on 14 May 1855 which purported to create this barony for Roche, but these were ruled invalid in 1856. Under the Acts of Union 1800, three pre-1801 Irish peerages had to go extinct for each new Irish peerage created. The three extinct peerages cited in 1855 were Viscounts Melbourne and Tyrconnel, and the Earl of Mountrath. However, although the earldom went extinct in 1802 with the death of the 7th Earl of Mountrath, the subsidiary title of Baron Castle Coote passed by special remainder and remained extant (until 1827). As a result, the Committee for Privileges of the House of Lords reasoned that while the number of peerages had reduced in 1802, the number of peers had not, thus the 1855 patent was incompatible with the terms of the Act of Union. The 1856 patent substituted Viscount O'Neill for Earl of Mountrath and was accepted.

== History ==
The first baron represented County Cork and then Marylebone in the British House of Commons, taking the Chiltern Hundreds the day the spurious 1855 patent was issued. He also served as Lord Lieutenant of County Cork. His younger son, the third baron, sat as an Irish nationalist member of parliament for Kerry East. He was succeeded by his son, the fourth baron, who represented King's Lynn in parliament as a Conservative. The title is currently held by his grandson, the sixth Baron Fermoy, who succeeded his father in 1984.

The family seat is Nethercote House, near Nethercote, Warwickshire. The first baron was named after his relative Edmund Burke.

=== Royal connections ===
Diana, Princess of Wales, was a great-great-granddaughter of the 1st Baron Fermoy through her mother, Frances Shand Kydd. Shand Kydd was the younger daughter of Maurice Roche, 4th Baron Fermoy, a friend of King George VI and the elder of the twin sons of the American heiress Frances Ellen Work and her first husband, James Boothby Burke Roche, who, after their divorce, became the 3rd Baron Fermoy. Diana's maternal grandmother, Ruth Roche, Baroness Fermoy, was a confidante and lady-in-waiting to Queen Elizabeth the Queen Mother, and the founder of the annual King's Lynn Festival (of classical music) in Norfolk, England.

== Barons Fermoy ==
- Edmond Burke Roche, 1st Baron Fermoy (1815–1874)
- Edward FitzEdmund Burke Roche, 2nd Baron Fermoy (1850–1920)
- James Boothby Burke Roche, 3rd Baron Fermoy (1851–1920)
- (Edmund) Maurice Burke Roche, 4th Baron Fermoy (1885–1955)
- Edmund James Burke Roche, 5th Baron Fermoy (1939–1984)
- (Patrick) Maurice Burke Roche, 6th Baron Fermoy (born 1967)

The heir presumptive is the present holder's brother, Edmund Hugh Burke Roche (born 1972).
The heir presumptive's heir apparent is his son, Archie Edmund Roche (born 2007).

=== Male-line family tree ===
Male-line family tree, Barons Fermoy.

Edmond Roche; 1st Baron Fermoy; 1815–1874
Edward Roche; 2nd Baron Fermoy; 1850–1920	James Roche; 3rd Baron Fermoy; 1851–1920
Maurice Roche; 4th Baron Fermoy; 1885–1955
Edmund Roche; 5th Baron Fermoy; 1939–1984
Maurice Roche; 6th Baron Fermoy born 1967	Hon. Edmund Roche born 1972
Archie Roche born 2007

=== Line of succession ===
Line of succession
- Edmund Burke Roche, 1st Baron Fermoy (1815–1874)
  - Edward FitzEdmund Burke Roche, 2nd Baron Fermoy (1850–1920)
  - James Boothby Burke Roche, 3rd Baron Fermoy (1851–1920)
    - (Edmund) Maurice Burke Roche, 4th Baron Fermoy (1885–1955)
      - Edmund James Burke Roche, 5th Baron Fermoy (1939–1984)
        - (Patrick) Maurice Burke Roche, 6th Baron Fermoy (born 1967)
        - (1) Hon. Edmund Hugh Burke Roche (born 1972)
          - (2) Archie Edmund Roche (born 2007)
  - Hon. Alexis Charles Burke Roche (1853–1914)
    - George Denis Burke Roche (1893–1954)
      - Alexis Martinus Burke Roche (1922–1989)
        - (3) Peter Martin Burke Roche (born 1974)

== See also ==
- Fermoy Barony
- House of Burke
- Viscount Fermoy
