= Edmund Roche, 5th Baron Fermoy =

British businessman (1939–1984)

The Right Honourable The Lord Fermoy
- 5th Baron Fermoy
- Born: Edmund James Burke Roche; 20 March 1939
- Died: 19 August 1984 (aged 45); Hungerford, Berkshire, England
- Spouse: Lavinia Frances Elizabeth Pitman (m. 1964)
- Issue: Frances Roche; Elizabeth Roche; Maurice Roche, 6th Baron Fermoy; Edmund Roche
- Parents: Maurice Roche, 4th Baron Fermoy; Ruth Sylvia Gill

Edmund James Burke Roche, 5th Baron Fermoy (20 March 1939 – 19 August 1984), was a British businessman who held a title in the Peerage of Ireland. He was the maternal uncle of Diana, Princess of Wales.

== Early life and education ==
He was born on 20 March 1939, the only son and youngest child of Maurice Roche, 4th Baron Fermoy, and his wife, Ruth Sylvia Gill, youngest daughter of William Smith Gill. His father died in 1955.

He was a graduate of Eton and the Royal Military Academy Sandhurst.

== Career ==
He became the 5th Baron Fermoy in 1955 when his father died. He was an elected member of Newbury District Council between 1976 and 1979. He was chairman of Eddington Bindery Ltd, based at the Fermoy family home near Hungerford. He was also a steeplechase jockey.

== Marriage and children ==
He was married to Lavinia Frances Elizabeth Pitman (born 1941), daughter of John Pitman (a descendant of Sir Isaac Pitman) and Elizabeth Donaldson.

They had four children:

- The Hon. Frances Caroline Burke Roche (born 31 March 1965), married Peter Stanley in 1990. They have three children:
  - Richard Hugh Edward Stanley (born 1 May 1993)
  - Portia Ruth Isobel Stanley (born 19 April 1995)
  - Algernon Edmond Stanley (born 8 March 1999)
- The Hon. Elizabeth Burke Roche (27 March 1966 – 2 April 1966)
- Maurice Burke Roche, 6th Baron Fermoy (born 11 October 1967), married Tessa Fiona Kayll on 26 March 1998. They have two daughters:
  - The Hon. Arabella Elizabeth Roche (born 18 March 1999)
  - The Hon. Eliza Lavinia Roche (born 9 November 2000)
- The Hon. Edmund Hugh Burke Roche (born 5 February 1972), married Phillipa Katie Victoria Long in 2004. They have three children:
  - Rosie Jeanne Roche (21 June 2005 – 14 July 2025)
  - Archie Edmund Roche (born 5 October 2007)
  - Agatha Frances Roche (born 15 October 2009)

== Death ==
After suffering from depression for a long period of time, he died from suicide by gunshot at his home, Eddington House, in Hungerford on 19 August 1984. He was 45. He is buried in the churchyard of St Mary Magdalene Church, Sandringham.

In 1995, Fermoy's widow, Lavinia Fermoy, married Nigel Edward Corbally Stourton, a grandson of Alfred Stourton, 23rd Baron Mowbray.

== Royal connections ==
Lord Fermoy and his family had close connections to the British royal family. His mother was a longstanding member of Queen Elizabeth The Queen Mother's household. His sister Frances was the mother of Lady Diana Spencer. As the bride's maternal uncle, Lord Fermoy attended her wedding to the Prince of Wales in 1981.

Peerage of Ireland
Preceded by Maurice Roche	Baron Fermoy; 1955–1984	Succeeded by Maurice Roche
