= Park House, Sandringham =

Country house hotel in England

Park House
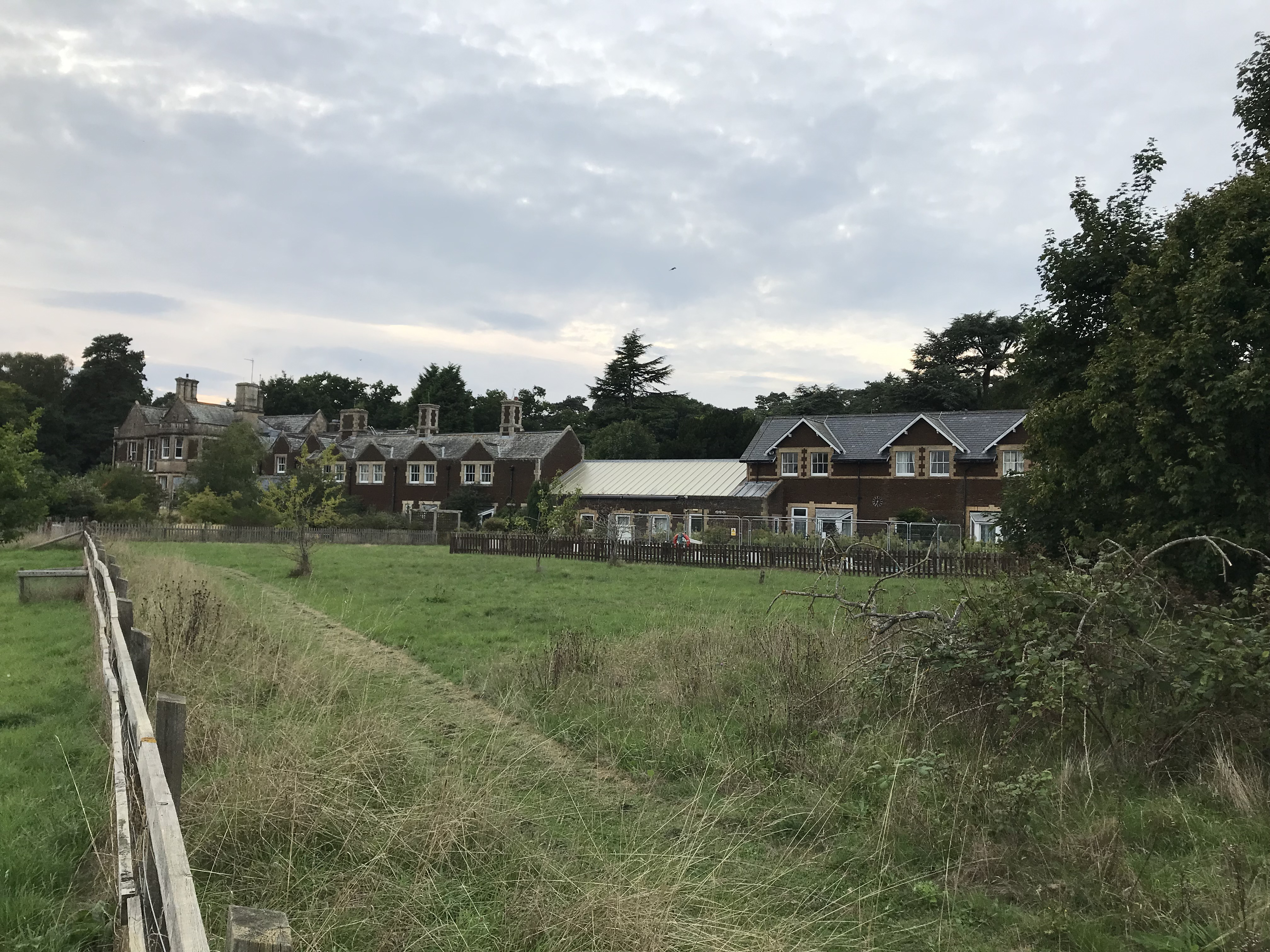
- The original building to the left, later extension to the right

- Location within Norfolk

General information
- Architectural style: Jacobethan
- Location: Sandringham, Norfolk, England
- Coordinates: 52°49′39.8″N 0°30′21″E
- Current tenants: Vacant

Park House stands on the Sandringham estate in North Norfolk, England. It was built by Edward, Prince of Wales (later Edward VII) as a home for General Sir William Knollys, who had been appointed comptroller of the prince's household in 1862. In the 20th century, the house was let, and in the 1950s or 1960s was rented by John Spencer, Viscount Althorp (later 8th Earl Spencer). On 1 July 1961, his fourth child, Diana Frances Spencer (later the Princess of Wales), was born at Park House. Later in the 20th century, the building was run as a hotel managed by the Leonard Cheshire charity. Following the 2020 COVID-19 pandemic the charity decided to exit the lease. As of 2025, the house is vacant.

== History and description ==
In 1861, Queen Victoria's eldest son and heir, Albert Edward, the future King Edward VII, was approaching his 20th birthday. Edward's dissipated lifestyle had been disappointing to his parents, and his father, Prince Albert, thought that marriage and the purchase of a suitable establishment were necessary to ground the prince in country life and pursuits and lessen the influence of the "Marlborough House set" (Note: The Marlborough House set consisted of a group of Edward's friends, many of whose backgrounds or Jewish religion made them socially unacceptable in mid-Victorian England. The Countess of Warwick, a mistress of Edward, recalled her class's dislike of the Prince's many Jewish friends: "We resented the introduction of the Jews into the social circle of the Prince of Wales ... because they had brains. As a class, we did not like brains.") with which he was involved. Albert had his staff investigate 18 possible country estates that might be suitable, including Newstead Abbey in Nottinghamshire and Houghton Hall in Norfolk. Sandringham Hall was on the list of the estates considered, and a personal recommendation to the Prince Consort from the Prime Minister Lord Palmerston, stepfather to the owner, swayed Prince Albert. Negotiations were only slightly delayed by Albert's death in December 1861—his widow declared, "His wishes – his plans – about everything are to be my law". Edward visited in February 1862, and a sale was agreed for the house and just under 8,000 acres (3,200 ha) of land, which was finalised that October. Queen Victoria only twice visited the house she had paid for. (Note: The architectural historian John Cornforth suggests that the purchase was funded by the Prince himself, "out of the capital skilfully built up for him during his minority by his father". A. N. Wilson, in his biography of Queen Victoria, is clear that the Queen paid the bill.) Over the course of the next 40 years, and with considerable expenditure, Edward was to create a house and country estate that his friend Charles Carington called "the most comfortable in England".

Edward's building programme at Sandringham saw him construct Park House in 1863 as a home for General Sir William Knollys, who had been appointed comptroller of the prince's household in 1862. (Note: The Knollys family had a long history of Royal service, which continued with Sir William's son, Francis who served as private secretary to both Edward VII and George V.) The building material is Carrstone with ashlar dressings. The style is Jacobethan, following that of Sandringham House.

In the 20th century, the house was let, and Princess Diana's mother, Frances Shand Kydd, was born at Park House when it was rented by her father, Maurice Roche, Lord Fermoy, a friend of the then Duke of York (later George VI), and Member of Parliament for King's Lynn. (Note: Frances Shand Kydd was born at Park House on 20 January 1936, the same day on which King George V died at Sandringham House.) (Note: Maurice Roche, Lord Fermoy was part of the shooting party hosted at Sandringham by George VI on 5 February 1952, before George's death at Sandringham House on the night of 5/6 February.) Later it was rented by Frances' husband, John Spencer, Viscount Althorp (later 8th Earl Spencer) and on 19 March 1955, Elizabeth Sarah Spencer, daughter of Frances and John Spencer, was born there. On 12 January 1960, the Hon. John Spencer, Sarah's brother, died within ten hours of his birth at Park House. On 1 July 1961, their fourth child, Diana Frances Spencer (later Princess of Wales), was born there. Park House was her childhood home until the age of 14, when her father succeeded to the Spencer earldom and moved to Althorp House.

In the later 20th century, the building was run as a hotel managed by the Leonard Cheshire charity. In 2019, the charity developed plans for a £2.3m refurbishment programme, which were deferred because of the 2020 COVID-19 pandemic. The charity later decided to discontinue the redevelopment and work with the Sandringham Estate to exit the lease. As of 2026, the house is vacant.

== Sources ==
- King, Greg (2007). Twilight of Splendor: The Court of Queen Victoria During Her Diamond Jubilee Year. New York, NY: John Wiley & Sons. ISBN 978-0-470-04439-1.
- Mackworth-Young, Robin; Ransom, Roger (1993). Sandringham. Norwich, UK: Jarrold Publishing. OCLC 51796971.
- Matson, John (2011). Sandringham Days: The Domestic Life of the Royal Family in Norfolk 1862–1952. Stroud, UK: The History Press. ISBN 978-0-752-46582-1. OCLC 751833059.
- Messent, Claude J.W. (1974). The Architecture on the Royal Estate of Sandringham. Norwich, UK: Self-published. ISBN 978-0-950-13251-8. OCLC 1092122.
- Pevsner, Nickolaus; Wilson, Bill (2002). Norfolk 2: North-West and South. The Buildings of England. New Haven, CT / London, UK: Yale University Press. ISBN 978-0-300-09657-6.
- Plumptre, George (1995). Edward VII. Ann Arbor, MI: University of Michigan Press. ISBN 978-1-857-93076-4.
- Tinniswood, Adrian (2016). The Long Weekend: Life in the English Country House between the Wars. London, UK: Jonathan Cape. ISBN 978-022-409945-5. OCLC 951212805.
- Walch, Helen (2012). Sandringham: A Royal Estate for 150 Years. Sandringham, UK: The Sandringham Estate. Archived from the original on 28 June 2018.
- Wilson, A.N. (2016). Victoria: A Life. London, UK: Atlantic Books. ISBN 978-1-786-49034-6. OCLC 944156927.
