= Russian wedding ring =

Jewellry

Russian Wedding Rings, also known as Triple rolling rings, are three interlocking bands of rose, white, and yellow gold, worn on the right hand. Each band is much thinner than normal bands. It is said that the three bands symbolize the Holy Trinity of Christian Orthodox religion, or the past, present, and future of the couple. No stones are set in the ring.

Design was invented in 1920s by Cartier.
