= West Heath Girls' School =

English girls' private school (1865–1997)

Information
- Funding type: Private school
- Established: 1865
- Closed: 1997
- Gender: Girls

West Heath Girls' School was an English girls' private school established in 1865, initially in London and from 1932 near Sevenoaks, Kent. It closed in 1997.

== History ==
Philip Bennet Power and his wife, Emma, undertook the education of their daughters at their Abbey Wood home, West Heath House. The quality of the girls' education attracted other local families to ask the Powers to teach their children, and West Heath School was thus opened in 1865.

In 1879, the expanding school moved to 1 Ham Common, in what was then the agricultural community of Ham, Surrey. The house, set in over 10 acres (4.0 ha) of grounds, was the former residence of the Duc de Chartres.

In 1890, Sarah, Maria and Anna Buckland and Jane Percival, who owned a similar school in Reading, joined forces with the ageing Emma Power at Ham Common, and they ran the school until its purchase in 1900 by Emma Lawrence and Margaret Skeat. Miss Elliott joined the staff in 1928 and was appointed principal the following year.

The development of nearby shops and housing prompted a second move, Ham having become "too suburbanised for a high-class girls' school". In 1932, the school moved to its final site, the 18th-century Ashgrove House, near Sevenoaks, the former home of the Elliot family. The larger premises allowed the school to grow from its previous capacity at Ham of about seventy boarders, to over one hundred by the end of the Second World War.

Diana, Princess of Wales, then Diana Spencer, attended the school from 1974 to 1977 and won an award as "the girl giving maximum help to the school and her schoolfellows".

In the 1990s, the school had financial difficulties due to falling numbers of pupils, and it was placed into receivership in 1997.

== Later use of the site ==
The Diana, Princess of Wales Memorial Fund considered buying the school, but decided against it, and Mohamed Al Fayed stepped in to buy West Heath for £2,300,000 on 20 May 1998 as new premises for the Beth Marie Centre. He later pledged to contribute a further £550,000 towards equipping the school. In a statement, he said:

I am surprised that the Princess Diana Memorial Fund, with all its millions in the bank, did not show a greater interest in this project. I believe it to be a far more fitting tribute to her work than putting her name on tasteless souvenirs.

The New School at West Heath, a special school, opened in the same premises on 14 September 1998, and was renamed as West Heath School in September 2015.

== Notable former pupils ==
- Diana, Princess of Wales
- Lady Sarah McCorquodale
- Lady Jane Fellowes
- Issy van Randwyck
- Annabel Croft
- Penelope Farmer
- Gillian Joynson-Hicks
- Tilda Swinton
- Rose Ridley
- Ethel Haythornthwaite
- Joanna Hogg
- Cath Kidston
