= Edmond Roche (poet) =

Edmond Louis Joseph Arthur Roche (20 February 1828 in Calais – 24 December 1861 in Paris) was a 19th-century French poet, playwright, librettist and violinist.

A student of Habeneck at the Paris conservatory where he learned to play the violin (1842), he became first violinist of the orchestra of the Théâtre de la Porte-Saint-Martin before leaving this position to become a customs employee.

== Works ==
A friend of Richard Wagner, he gave the first translation in French of Tannhäuser.

His poésies were published in 1863 by Michel Lévy posthumously at the expense of his friends, with a preface by Victorien Sardou with engravings by Camille Corot and others.

- 1853: Mozart, étude poétique
- 1856: Les Algues, études marines
- 1859: Stradivarius
- 1859: Les Récréations enfantines
- 1860: L'Italie de nos jours
- 1861: Les Virtuoses contemporains
- 1863: La dernière fourberie de Scapin (À propos in one act in verse), (posthumous)

== Bibliography ==
- Madeleine Guignebert, neÌe Duplessy, Henri Weitzmann, Le douanier de Wagner, Edmond Roche, 1861
- Arthur Pougin, Supplément et complément, vol.2, 1881, (p. 427)
- Revue internationale de musique française, Vol.1, Slatkine, 1980, p. 18
