= West Heath School (special school) =

West Heath School (SEN SCHOOL)
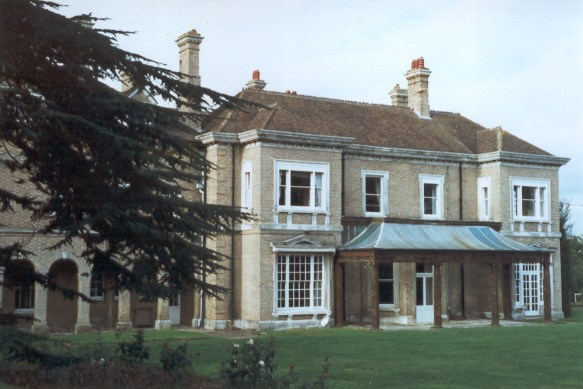

Location
- Ashgrove Road; Sevenoaks, Kent, TN13 1SR; England; 51°15′18″N 0°11′10″E

Information
- Motto: "Rebuilding Lives Through Education"
- Established: 1998
- Principal: Alex Hamilton
- Website: http://westheathschool.com/

West Heath School is an independent school in Sevenoaks, Kent. It caters for children for whom mainstream schooling has become insufficient, for varying reasons. The school's motto is "Rebuilding Lives Through Education."

The school, founded in its current form as a charitable trust on 14 September 1998 as the Beth Marie Centre, is based in 31 acres (13 ha) of parkland on lease from Mohamed Al-Fayed, who contributed almost £3 million towards the school. The building formerly housed West Heath Girls' School, a girls' school with around 100 boarding pupils, established in 1865 and closed in 1997.

== History and grounds ==
The school occupies premises formerly occupied by West Heath Girls' School, a private school founded in London in 1867, and which moved to this site, the 18th-century Ashgrove House, in 1932. The former mansion house is grade II listed. Pupils included (from 1974 to 1977) Diana Spencer, the future Princess of Wales. In the 1990s the school began to experience financial difficulties owing to falling pupil numbers, and it was placed into receivership in 1997.

The Diana, Princess of Wales Memorial Fund considered buying the school, but decided against it, and Mohamed Al Fayed stepped in to buy West Heath for £2,670,000 on 20 May 1998 as new premises for the Beth Marie Centre. He later pledged to contribute a further £550,000 towards equipping the school. In a statement, he said:

I am surprised that the Princess Diana Memorial Fund, with all its millions in the bank, did not show a greater interest in this project. I believe it to be a far more fitting tribute to her work than putting her name on tasteless souvenirs.

The school was founded in its current form, as The New School at West Heath, with Valerie May as Principal, on 14 September 1998. At the start it had around 30 pupils. Boarding began in the year 2000, and there are six boarding houses, each named after one of the trustees (see "Management", below); Tarrant, Sissons, Astor/best house, Ruth, Hunniford and Esther.

The school was renamed as West Heath School in September 2015.

== Child sexual abuse ==
Vice-principal and head of child protection (at the time) William Whillock was convicted as a sex offender in 2010 via the accidentally left phone of his victim. He had encouraged a pupil to send sexual photographs of herself. Whillock was suspended following the discovery and later sacked. He was given a three-year community sentence and banned from working with children.

== Management ==
Founding patron: Mohamed Al-Fayed

The school is governed by a board of 10 trustees.

Current management is listed on the school's Web site.

== Academic performance ==
=== 2004 ===
GCSE grades:

- Number of pupils aged 15: 20
- Pupils achieving 5 or more GCSE passes (A*–C): 0%
- Pupils failing to achieve at least one entry level qualification: 20%
- Average total GCSE point score per 15-year-old: 121.3 (for comparison, the nearest non-Special Educational Needs school, Sevenoaks School: 498.2)

=== 2009 ===
GCSE grades:

- Number of pupils: 31
- Pupils aged 16 achieving 5 or more GCSE grades A*–G: 89% (unpublished which of this is passes, e.g. A*–C)
- Average total point score per 16-year-old: 23.8 (for comparison, the nearest non-SEN school, Sevenoaks School average: 66.8)
- Pupils with Special Educational Needs: 100%

=== 2002 ===
Key Stage 3 tests (not GCSE):

- % pupils achieving level 9 or above in English test: 100%
- % pupils achieving level 9 or above in Maths test: 100%
- % pupils achieving level 9 or above in Science test: 100%
- % 15-year-olds achieving 9 or more grades A*–C: 100%
  - 1998–2002 decrease in % of 15-year-olds getting 5 or more A*–C: 100%
- % 15-year-olds achieving 5 or more grades D–G: 0%
- % 15-year-olds failing to achieve at least 5 G grades: 0%

=== 2000 ===
GCSE grades:

- Pupils achieving 5 or more GCSE grades A*–C: 33%
- Pupils failing to achieve at least 5 GCSE passes: 67%
- Pupils failing to achieve any GCSE passes: 17%
- Pupils with Special Educational Needs: 100%
- Pupils with SEN with statements: 61.9%
- Pupils with SEN without statements: 38.1%
- Number of pupils: 42

=== 1999 ===
GCSE grades:

- Pupils achieving 5 or more GCSE grades A*–C: 21%
- Pupils failing to achieve at least 5 GCSE passes: 79%
- Pupils failing to achieve any GCSE passes: 11%

== Post 16 ==
As well as teaching pupils from Years 7 to 11, the school operates a section allowing pupils to get "support" from the school while going to college; the school itself does not have staff to teach subjects at A-level. Many continue boarding at the school while going to college elsewhere.
