= Lady Jane Fellowes =

British noble; sister of Diana, Princess of Wales (born 1957)

The Right Honourable The Lady Fellowes
- Born: Cynthia Jane Spencer; 11 February 1957 (age 69); King's Lynn, Norfolk, England
- Education: West Heath Girls' School
- Spouse: Robert Fellowes, Baron Fellowes (m. 1978; died 2024)
- Children: 3
- Parent(s): John Spencer, 8th Earl Spencer; Frances Shand Kydd
- Relatives: Lady Sarah McCorquodale (sister); Diana, Princess of Wales (sister); Charles Spencer, 9th Earl Spencer (brother)
- Family: Spencer

Cynthia Jane Fellowes, Baroness Fellowes (née Spencer; born 11 February 1957), is one of the two older sisters of Diana, Princess of Wales, the other being Lady Sarah McCorquodale.

== Early life and education ==
Lady Fellowes is the second daughter of Edward John Spencer, 8th Earl Spencer (1924–1992), and the Hon. Frances Ruth Burke Roche (1936–2004). Her parents married in 1954 but divorced in 1969. She has always used her middle name of Jane (just as her elder sister also uses one of her middle names). One of Jane's godparents is Prince Edward, Duke of Kent. She was a bridesmaid at his 1961 wedding to Katharine Worsley.

Like her sisters, Lady Fellowes was educated at West Heath boarding school near Sevenoaks in Kent. Sources say she was an excellent student, achieving the status of school prefect and passing a number of A-level exams. To paraphrase Andrew Morton, Lady Fellowes acquired a "hatful" of O-level and A-level exams.

== Marriage and children ==
On 20 April 1978, Jane married her distant relation Robert Fellowes (1941–2024), then assistant private secretary to the Queen. The ceremony was held at the Royal Military Chapel (The Guards' Chapel), Wellington Barracks.

On 12 July 1999, Robert Fellowes was granted a life peerage as Baron Fellowes, of Shotesham in the County of Norfolk, after first being knighted as Sir Robert Fellowes.

Lord and Lady Fellowes have three children, who are maternal first cousins of Prince William and Prince Harry and also paternal second cousins of Sarah Ferguson. Their daughter Laura is godmother to Prince William's daughter, Princess Charlotte.

== Relationship with Diana, Princess of Wales ==
After Diana's death, conflicting views about the two sisters' relationship were voiced. Diana's butler Paul Burrell stated that the relationship was strained because of Lord Fellowes's position as secretary to the Queen, and that by the time of Diana's death they had not spoken in a number of years. On the other hand, Diana's childhood nanny, Mary Clarke, author of memoirs about her experience raising Diana, stated that the relations between Lady Fellowes and Diana were not as bitter as Burrell and others have said or assumed. It is not clear when their relationship deteriorated (if it did), but the sisters were neighbours on the Kensington Palace estate, with Diana living at numbers 8 and 9, and Lady Fellowes living at a house called the Old Barracks.

Lady Fellowes and her sister Lady Sarah McCorquodale flew to Paris with their former brother-in-law Prince Charles to escort the Princess's body back for the public funeral. Witnesses reported that Lady Fellowes was very upset and needed to be assisted into a chair after seeing Diana's body at the hospital in Paris. Lady Sarah and Lady Fellowes played a part in the public funeral ceremony.

After Diana's death, Lord and Lady Fellowes led a largely private life, along with their three children. Lady Fellowes attended the wedding of Prince William and Catherine Middleton on 29 April 2011. She also attended the wedding of Prince Harry and Meghan Markle on 19 May 2018, at which she delivered a reading.
