= Albert Spencer, 7th Earl Spencer =

British peer and grandfather of Diana, Princess of Wales (1892–1975)

The Right Honourable The Earl Spencer TD FSA FRSA
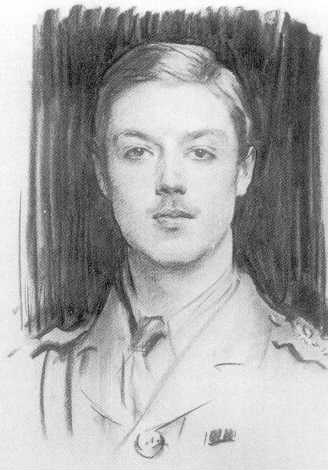
- Albert Spencer, Viscount Althorp, in World War I uniform
- Born: 23 May 1892; London, England
- Died: 9 June 1975 (aged 83); Northampton, Northamptonshire, England
- Education: Trinity College, Cambridge
- Spouse: Lady Cynthia Hamilton (m. 1919; died 1972)
- Children: Lady Anne Wake-Walker; John Spencer, 8th Earl Spencer
- Parent(s): Charles Spencer, 6th Earl Spencer; Margaret Baring
- Relatives: Diana, Princess of Wales (granddaughter)
- Military career
- Allegiance: United Kingdom
- Branch: British Army
- Service years: 1914–1924
- Rank: Captain
- Unit: 1st Life Guards
- Conflicts: World War I

Albert Edward John Spencer, 7th Earl Spencer (23 May 1892 – 9 June 1975), styled The Honourable Albert Spencer until 1910 and Viscount Althorp from 1910 to 1922, and known less formally as Jack Spencer, was a British peer. He was the paternal grandfather of Diana, Princess of Wales.

== Early life ==
Lord Spencer was born in London, the son of Charles Spencer, 6th Earl Spencer, and his wife, the former Margaret Baring, second daughter of Edward Baring, 1st Baron Revelstoke. His godparents included Edward VII.

He was educated at Harrow School and Trinity College, Cambridge.

== Career ==
On 5 August 1914, Spencer was commissioned as a second lieutenant in the 1st Regiment of Life Guards, was promoted to lieutenant on 21 October 1914, appointed an aide-de-camp on 9 May 1917, and promoted to captain on 15 June 1917. When 1st Life Guards merged with the 2nd Life Guards on 18 November 1922, Spencer was appointed a captain in the new regiment. He retired from the army on 20 September 1924, but remained a member of the Regular Army Reserve of Officers until reaching the mandatory retirement age on 2 June 1943.

On 27 August 1924, Lord Spencer was appointed the Honorary Colonel of the 4th (Territorial) Battalion, Northamptonshire Regiment, remaining in that role when it was renamed 50th (Northampton Regiment) Anti-Aircraft Battalion on 1 October 1937, and throughout its various post-war incarnations until finally relinquishing his appointment on 1 April 1967. He was awarded the Territorial Efficiency Decoration on 12 September 1944, with two clasps on 20 November 1953.

On 9 April 1935, Lord Spencer was appointed a Deputy Lieutenant of Northamptonshire, and became Lord Lieutenant of Northamptonshire on 11 March 1952, serving until 31 July 1967. He was made a knight of the Order of St. John of Jerusalem on 1 July 1955.

Lord Spencer was active in the local politics of Northamptonshire as a Conservative councillor. He opened his ancestral home, Althorp, to the public and was a well-known art connoisseur, being a trustee of the Wallace Collection and chairman of the Royal School of Needlework. He was a Fellow of both the Society of Antiquaries of London and the Royal Society of Arts, and for eight years in the 1960s he was Chair of the Advisory Council of the Victoria and Albert Museum. He was Chairman of the Governors at Wellingborough School from 1946 to 1972.

== Personal life ==
Lord Spencer married Lady Cynthia Hamilton, second daughter of the 3rd Duke of Abercorn, on 26 February 1919 at St. James's Church in Piccadilly, London, and they had two children:

- Lady Anne Spencer (4 August 1920 – 24 February 2020) married in 1944 to Captain Christopher Wake-Walker (1920–1998), son of Admiral Sir Frederic Wake-Walker, had issue.
- John Spencer, 8th Earl Spencer (24 January 1924 – 29 March 1992).

Lord Spencer died at St Matthews Nursing Home, Northampton, after a short illness, and was succeeded by his son, John, who was the father of Diana, Princess of Wales.

== Coat of arms ==
Coat of arms of Albert Spencer, 7th Earl Spencer
Coronet A Coronet of an Earl Crest Out of a Ducal Coronet Or a Griffin's Head Azure gorged with a Bar Gemelle Gules between two Wings expanded of the second Escutcheon Quarterly Argent and Gules in the 2nd and 3rd quarters a Fret Or over all on a Bend Sable three Escallops of the first Supporters Dexter: A Griffin per fess Ermine and Erminois gorged with a Collar Sable the edges flory-counterflory and chained of the last and on the Collar three Escallops Argent; Sinister: A Wyvern Erect on his tail Ermine similarly collared and chained Motto Dieu Defend Le Droit (God defend the right)

Honorary titles
Preceded by The Marquess of Exeter	Lord Lieutenant of Northamptonshire; 1952–1967	Succeeded by John Chandos-Pole
Peerage of Great Britain
Preceded by Charles Spencer	Earl Spencer; 1922–1975	Succeeded by John Spencer
