= Frances Shand Kydd =

Mother of Diana, Princess of Wales (1936–2004)

The Honourable Frances Shand Kydd
- Shand Kydd in 2002
- Born: Frances Ruth Roche; 20 January 1936; Sandringham, Norfolk, England
- Died: 3 June 2004 (aged 68); Seil, Argyll and Bute, Scotland
- Buried: Pennyfuir Cemetery, Oban, Argyll and Bute, Scotland
- Spouses: John Spencer, Viscount Althorp (m. 1954; div. 1969); Peter Shand Kydd (m. 1969; div. 1990)
- Issue: Lady Sarah McCorquodale; Lady Jane Fellowes; John Spencer; Diana, Princess of Wales; Charles Spencer, 9th Earl Spencer
- Father: Maurice Roche, 4th Baron Fermoy
- Mother: Ruth Sylvia Gill

Frances Ruth Shand Kydd (previously Spencer, née Roche; 20 January 1936 – 3 June 2004) was the mother of Diana, Princess of Wales, and the maternal grandmother of William, Prince of Wales, and Prince Harry, Duke of Sussex. Born into the British nobility, she was the daughter of Maurice Roche, 4th Baron Fermoy, and Ruth Roche, Baroness Fermoy, a confidante of Queen Elizabeth the Queen Mother. Following her divorce from Viscount Althorp in 1969, and Diana's death in 1997, Shand Kydd devoted her later years to Catholic charity work after converting to Catholicism.

== Early life ==
Frances Ruth Roche was born on 20 January 1936 at Park House, on the royal estate at Sandringham in Norfolk. Her birth occurred on the same day as the death of King George V. Her father, Maurice Roche, 4th Baron Fermoy, was a friend of King George VI and the elder son of the American heiress Frances Ellen Work and her first husband, the 3rd Baron Fermoy. Her mother, Ruth Roche, Baroness Fermoy, a daughter of Colonel William Smith Gill, was a confidante and lady-in-waiting to Queen Elizabeth (later the Queen Mother). Since birth, she held the style of The Honourable as the daughter of a baron.

She was educated at Downham School in Essex.

== Marriage and children ==
On 1 June 1954, Frances Roche married John Spencer, Viscount Althorp (later the 8th Earl Spencer), at Westminster Abbey. Queen Elizabeth II and other members of the royal family attended the ceremony. Aged 18, she became the youngest woman to marry at Westminster Abbey since 1893.

They had five children:

- Lady Sarah McCorquodale (born 19 March 1955), who married Neil Edmund McCorquodale, a second cousin once removed of her stepmother, Raine, Countess Spencer.
- Lady Jane Fellowes (born 11 February 1957), who married Robert Fellowes, Baron Fellowes, then Private Secretary to the Sovereign.
- The Honourable John Spencer (12 January 1960 – 12 January 1960), died within ten hours of his birth at Park House, Sandringham.
- Diana, Princess of Wales (1 July 1961 – 31 August 1997), first wife of Charles III.
- Charles Spencer, 9th Earl Spencer (born 20 May 1964), who married firstly Victoria Lockwood in 1989, secondly Caroline Freud (née Hutton and former wife of Matthew Freud) in 2001, thirdly, Karen Villeneuve in 2011, and fourthly Cat Jarman in 2026.

According to the gossip columnist and author Penny Junor, "Johnny could be violent, and [Frances] felt she and her children would be safer out of the home." Their daughter Diana also recalled "seeing my father slap my mother across the face and I was hiding behind the door and she was crying."

== Divorce and remarriage ==
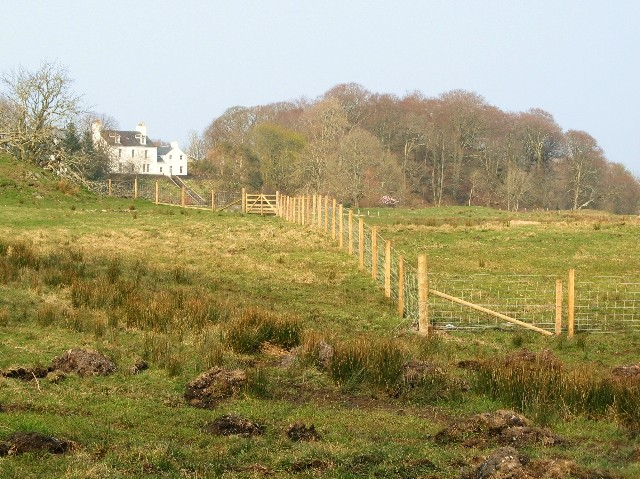
Ardencaple House, Isle of Seil, Scotland: country residence of Frances and her second husband, Peter Shand Kydd

Frances's marriage to Spencer was not a happy one, and, in 1967, she left him to be with Peter Shand Kydd, an heir to a wallpaper fortune in Australia, whom she had met the year before. His half-brother was the former champion amateur jockey William Shand Kydd (1937–2014), who was the brother-in-law of John Bingham, 7th Earl of Lucan. Frances lived with her two youngest children, Diana and Charles, in London during the separation in 1967, but, during that year's Christmas holidays, Spencer refused to let his children return to London with their mother. He was granted custody of their children by the courts after his former mother-in-law, Lady Fermoy, testified against her own daughter.

Frances and Kydd were married on 2 May 1969 and lived on the Scottish island of Seil, where they bought an 18th-century farmhouse called Ardencaple, 10 kilometres from Oban. She divided her time between London, Seil, and another sheep farm in Yass, New South Wales. On 14 July 1976, Spencer married Raine, Countess of Dartmouth, daughter of the novelist Dame Barbara Cartland. Although Frances lived a quiet life, she was thrust into public view following the engagement of her daughter Diana to Prince Charles (later Charles III) on 24 February 1981. Frances and Kydd separated in June 1988. In 1993, Kydd married Marie-Pierre Palmer (née Bécret), a French woman who ran a champagne-importing business in London.

== Later years and death ==
In 1996, Frances was banned from driving after being convicted of drunk driving, but denied she had a problem with alcohol. She and Diana quarrelled in May 1997, after Frances told Hello! magazine it was "absolutely wonderful" that Diana had lost her title of "Her Royal Highness" following her divorce from Charles. They were reportedly not on speaking terms at the time of Diana's death.

She spent her later years in solitude on Seil. She became a Catholic and devoted herself to Catholic charities. She eventually became involved with the Hosanna House and Children's Pilgrimage Trust, the Royal National Mission for Deep Sea Fishermen, the Mallaig and Northwest Fishermen's Association, and the National Search and Rescue Dogs Association.

In October 2002, when Frances left her Scottish home to give testimony at the trial of Diana's former butler, Paul Burrell, burglars targeted her house and stole her jewellery.

Frances died following a long illness that included Parkinson's disease and brain cancer, at her home in Scotland, on 3 June 2004, aged 68. Her funeral was held at St Columba's Cathedral in Oban on 10 June, attended by her children, sister, and grandchildren, including Princes William (who gave a reading) and Harry. Her former son-in-law, Charles, did not attend, as he was travelling to Washington to represent the Royal Family at the state funeral of the former US President Ronald Reagan the following day. Frances was buried in Pennyfuir Cemetery in Oban, Argyll and Bute.

== Biography ==
In 2001, Maxine Riddington published a biographical book about her, entitled Frances: The Remarkable Story of Princess Diana's Mother.
