= Peter Shand Kydd =

Stepfather of Diana, Princess of Wales (1925–2006)

- Born: 23 April 1925; London, England
- Died: 23 March 2006 (aged 80); Aldeburgh, Suffolk, England
- Spouses: Janet Munro Kerr (m. 1952; div. 1968); Frances Spencer (m. 1969; div. 1990); Marie-Pierre Palmer (m. 1993; div. 1995)
- Children: 3 including John
- Relatives: John Martin Munro Kerr (ex-grandfather-in-law)

Peter Shand Kydd (23 April 1925 – 23 March 2006) was the stepfather of Diana, Princess of Wales, and heir to the wallpaper fortune built by his father.

== Early life ==
Shand Kydd was born in London on 23 April 1925. His father was Norman Shand Kydd (1895–1962) and his mother was Frances Madalein Foy (1900–1983), whose uncle was the Australian businessman Mark Foy. He was the half-brother of champion amateur jockey William Shand Kydd (1937–2014), who was the husband of Christina Muriel Duncan, sister of Veronica Bingham, Countess of Lucan.

== Marriages ==
He married Janet Munro Kerr, granddaughter of John Martin Munro Kerr. He sold the family business in 1962 and moved his family to "Kooringa", Young, NSW, Australia, where he became a sheep farmer.

After selling the property and returning to England, and still married, he began an affair with Diana's mother (Frances) Viscountess Althorp. She was married to John Spencer, Viscount Althorp, later 8th Earl Spencer. They both divorced, and then were free to marry each other, which they did on 2 May 1969. He thus became stepfather to her four children, including Diana, although the Viscount eventually won the bitter custody battle. They lived in Buckinghamshire and West Itchenor, West Sussex, finally settling on a 1,000 acre (4 km^{2}) farm on the remote Scottish island of Seil. The couple separated in June 1988. Frances blamed the pressure of media attention, following the rise to fame of Diana, for the breakdown of the marriage.

In 1993, Shand Kydd married Marie-Pierre Palmer (née Bécret), who ran a champagne-importing business in London, which lasted until April 1995.

== Descendants ==
By his first wife, Shand Kydd had three children. Their elder son, Adam Shand Kydd, was born in 1954 and became a novelist, before dying in Cambodia in 2004. His youngest son is John Shand Kydd.

== Death ==
Peter Shand Kydd died in Aldeburgh, Suffolk on 23 March 2006, aged 80. He was buried in Aldeburgh two weeks later, on 6 April.
