= The Jim Jefferies Show =

Television series

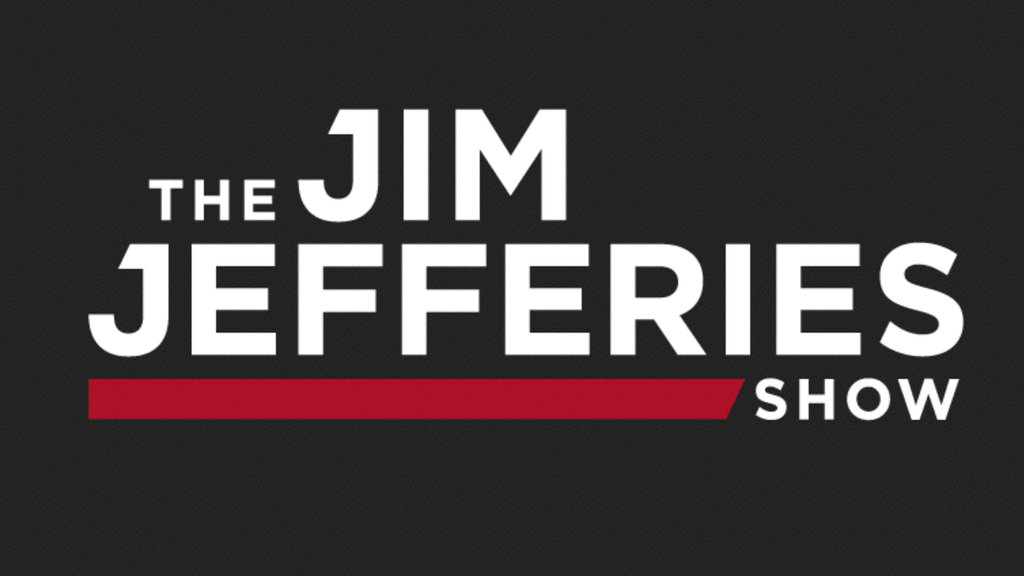
- Genre: Comedy; News satire; Political satire; Talk show
- Created by: Jim Jefferies
- Written by: Jason Reich
- Directed by: Brian McAloon
- Presented by: Jim Jefferies
- Country of origin: United States
- Original language: English
- No. of seasons: 3
- No. of episodes: 70

Production
- Executive producers: Jim Jefferies; Scott Zabielski; Alex Murray; Tim Sarkes
- Producer: Andrew Wantuck
- Production locations: Sunset Las Palmas Studios; Hollywood, California
- Editors: Chris McKinley; Tonya Dreher
- Running time: 22 minutes
- Production companies: Nugget Productions; Brillstein Entertainment Partners; Addison & Broad

Original release
- Network: Comedy Central
- Release: June 6, 2017 – November 19, 2019

The Jim Jefferies Show is an American late-night talk and news satire television program hosted by comedian Jim Jefferies. The show aired Tuesdays on Comedy Central and tackles the week's top stories and most controversial issues. In March 2017, Comedy Central ordered ten half-hour episodes. The series premiered on June 6, 2017, and was later extended with ten additional episodes, which began airing after a five-week hiatus. On January 30, 2019, Comedy Central renewed the show for a third season which premiered on March 19, 2019 and, after a summer hiatus, ran from September 17, 2019 through November 19, 2019 when the show was canceled, ending its three-year run. As of December 2021, seasons 1 and 2 are available to watch on Paramount+.

== Background ==
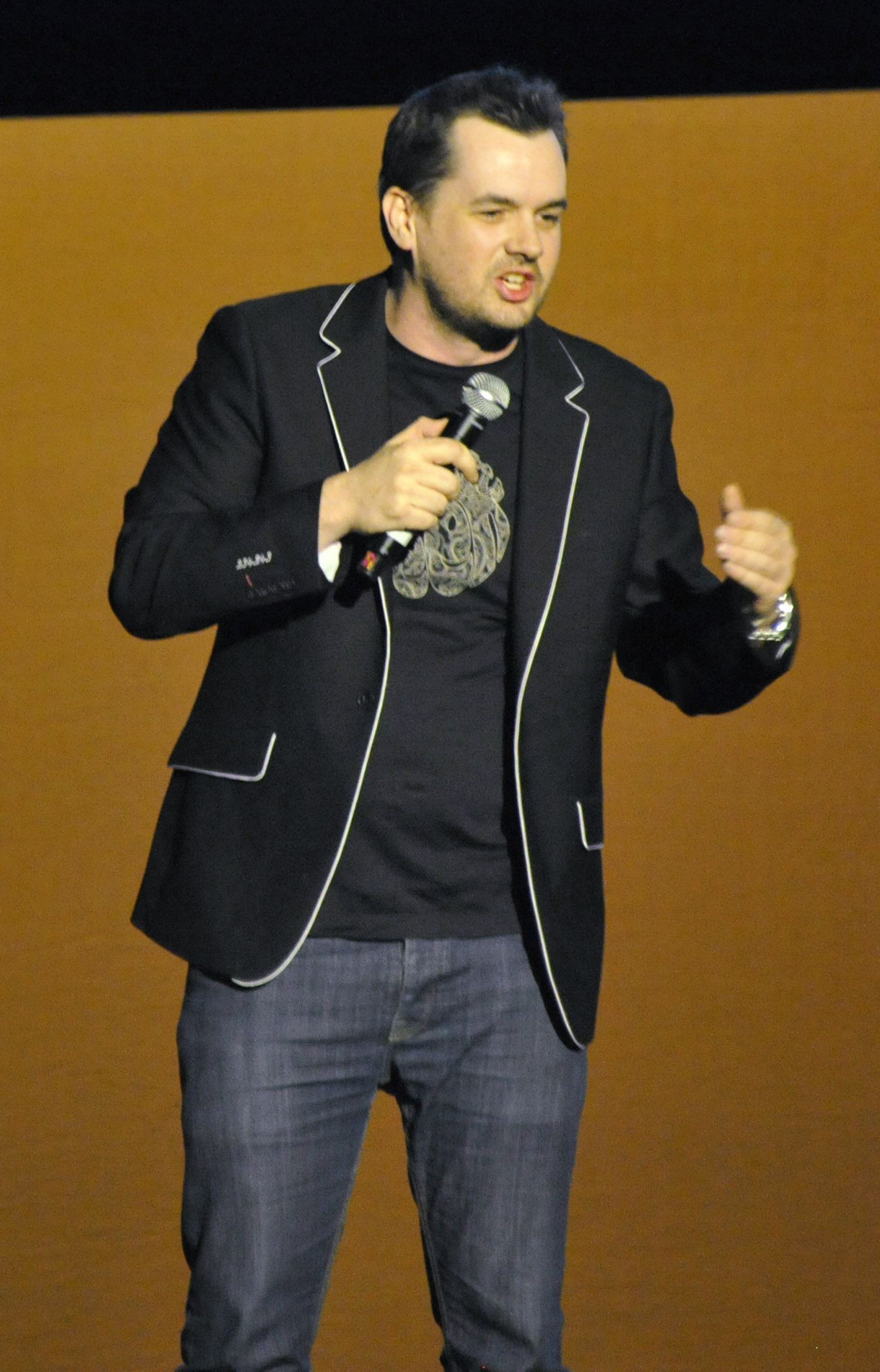
Jefferies in 2012

Prior to his foray into late night television, Jefferies starred in the comedy series Legit, which ran for two seasons between 2013 and 2014 on FX and FXX. Early in his stand-up career, Jefferies was well known for his off-color humor. In his Netflix special Bare (2014), Jefferies performed a routine on gun control, which was previously used in his stand-up and on Legit. The Bare routine has gone viral, especially after mass shootings in the United States. Jefferies revisited the topic in his Netflix special Freedumb (2016), in which he also criticized then-Republican candidate Donald Trump during the 2016 presidential campaign. Jefferies has since become a commentator, often speaking to newspapers and appearing on television programs to discuss his political opinions.

In late 2016, Comedy Central ordered a pilot for the show, which was taped on December 7. The network picked up the show as a weekly half-hour series in March 2017, with ten episodes set to air in the summer.

Actor Brad Pitt became a fan of Jefferies after seeing clips of his standup, and called him to ask if he could be part of his new show. He was enthusiastic when Jefferies suggested he be the show's weatherman. Pitt, who is only referred to generically as "Jim Jefferies Show Weatherman", is paid the SAG minimum salary of $400 per episode.

=== Promotion ===
In anticipation of the program's premiere, an online presence was launched for The Jim Jefferies Show in May 2017, including social media accounts. Jefferies introduced a fictional goldfish for the family of Donald Trump named Dave, who is dubbed the first goldfish of the United States. In June, Jefferies appeared as a guest on Unmasked, The Daily Show, CBS This Morning, Off Camera and Conan. Jefferies continued performing stand-up gigs in between show tapings and media appearances.

== Production ==
The Jim Jefferies Show was taped on Tuesdays around 12:00 p.m. Pacific time at Sunset Las Palmas Studios in Hollywood, California. On November 6, 2019, it was announced that the series would conclude on November 19 as Jefferies moved to focus on a put pilot in production for NBC.

== Broadcast ==
On January 15, 2018, Comedy Central renewed the series for a 20-episode second season, which premiered on March 27, 2018. On September 13, 2018, Comedy Central announced additional new episodes would air beginning September 18, 2018.

In Australia, The Jim Jefferies Show aired Thursdays on Foxtel's Comedy Channel and Fetch TV's Comedy Central Australia.

In Canada, The Jim Jefferies Show aired Tuesdays on The Comedy Network.

In the United Kingdom, The Jim Jefferies Show aired Fridays on Comedy Central UK.

== Podcast ==
Jefferies co-hosted The Jim Jefferies Show Podcast with his fellow comedian Forrest Shaw, which was released alongside the last ten episodes of the first season and served as an aftershow for the television program. Each podcast features detailed commentary on news and politics, segments featured in the latest television episode, and jokes that were left out of the show. This was the first series of a new podcast network for Comedy Central.

== Reception ==
In a mixed review of the show for The Hollywood Reporter, Daniel Fienberg wrote that "What The Jim Jefferies Show needs is to stop trying to be like the other kids and to start trying to be like Jim Jefferies." Mike Hale of the New York Times also gave the show a mixed review, writing that "As a late-night host, Mr. Jefferies can appear to be doing nothing much, but there’s a tricky balancing act going on between his ordinary-bloke persona and his sometimes savagely raunchy punch lines. The results are hit and miss, and sometimes it’s a long while between hits." However, Hale also praised Jefferies for occasionally delivering "explosive" lines in the show.

The first season ended with Jefferies listed in Variety's "Fresh Voices in TV Who Broke Out in 2017" and the writing team nominated for Best Comedy/Variety Talk Series at the 2018 Writers Guild of America Awards.

== Cancellation ==
On November 6, 2019, Comedy Central announced the show had been canceled, but would air an additional two weeks of the series, with the last show to be broadcast on November 19, 2019.

== Episodes ==
Season	Episodes	Originally released	
Season	Episodes	First released	Last released
1	20	June 6, 2017	November 21, 2017
2	30	March 27, 2018	November 20, 2018
3	20	March 19, 2019	November 19, 2019

=== Season 1 (2017) ===
No. overall	No. in season	Title	Original release date	US viewers (millions)
1	1	"Worldwide Racism"	June 6, 2017	0.49
Donald Trump's authoritarian tendencies • The arguably racist Black Pete tradition in Holland • Racism in the United States • Comedy sketch with actor Brad Pitt
2	2	"Unpacking Impeachment"	June 13, 2017	0.38
Trump's reaction to the 2017 Qatar diplomatic crisis • First Lady Melania Trump–related merchandise in her hometown in Slovenia • Efforts to impeach Donald Trump • Comedy sketch with actor Brad Pitt
3	3	"Criminal Injustice"	June 20, 2017	0.48
Declaration of mistrial in the Bill Cosby case • Discussion with Azerbaijan's Ambassador to the United States, Elin Suleymanov, in Washington • Capital punishment in the United States • Comedy sketch with actor Brad Pitt
4	4	"Health Care Unhinged"	June 27, 2017	0.37
Better Care Reconciliation Act • Discussion with right-wing senator Pauline Hanson in Australia • Bill Cosby's plans to hold town halls on sexual assault laws
5	5	"Understanding the First Amendment"	July 11, 2017	0.43
Slow pace of Donald Trump's political appointments • Conspiracy theories • Misinterpretations of the First Amendment to the United States Constitution • Comedy sketch with actor Brad Pitt
6	6	"America's Age of Unenlightenment"	July 18, 2017	0.38
Anti-intellectualism in American politics • Environmental threats to the Great Barrier Reef • Corporate lobbying against environmental regulations • Comedy sketch with actor Brad Pitt
7	7	"Trophy Hunter Takedown"	July 25, 2017	0.43
Re-emergence of controversial domestic policy issues • Political positions of the 2017 Comic-Con attendees • Trophy hunting
8	8	"The Fight for LGBTQ Military Rights"	August 1, 2017	0.49
The Democratic Party's failed political campaigns • Sexual orientation and gender identity in the United States military • Interview with 2016 presidential candidate, Evan McMullin • Dismissal of White House Communications Director, Anthony Scaramucci
9	9	"The Threat of Nuclear War"	August 8, 2017	0.46
North Korea–United States relations • Assisted suicide in the United States • Interview with stand-up comedian Bill Burr • NASA's new job opening for a planetary protection officer
10	10	"Charlottesville's White Supremacist Rally"	August 15, 2017	0.41
Trump's reaction to the Charlottesville attack • The debate over Confederate monuments • Reforming American Immigration for Strong Employment Act • Reactions to Jefferies' joke about bombing Reno
11	11	"Jim's Police Ride-Along"	September 19, 2017	0.46
Immigration policy deal between Trump and Democratic leaders • Police use of firearms in the United Kingdom • Effects of the 2017 Atlantic hurricane season • Discussion with the mayor of Reno, Hillary Schieve
12	12	"Trump's Anti-NFL Freakout"	September 26, 2017	0.50
Debate between Trump and NFL players on race and protest • NFL player's risk of developing chronic traumatic encephalopathy • Interview with former CMS acting administrator, Andy Slavitt • Australian Marriage Law Postal Survey
13	13	"Trump's Bungled Response to Puerto Rico"	October 3, 2017	0.44
Jefferies' comment on the 2017 Las Vegas shooting • Trump's response to the crisis in Puerto Rico, in the aftermath of Hurricane Maria • Wasteful spending by members of Trump's cabinet • Interview with hip hop duo Insane Clown Posse • Jefferies' comment on a librarian rejecting Melania Trump's donation of Dr. Seuss books
14	14	"Hawaii's One-Party System"	October 10, 2017	0.40
ISIS's false claim of responsibility for the Las Vegas shooting • Politics of Hawaii • America's outdated Social Security number system • Logos of discontinued computer programs
15	15	"Trump's Congressional Twitter Troll"	October 17, 2017	0.43
Harvey Weinstein sexual misconduct allegations • Discussion with Congressman Ted Lieu in Washington • Russian interference in the 2016 United States elections • Fearmongering
16	16	"America's Opioid Epidemic"	October 24, 2017	0.45
Opioid epidemic • Alcohol use among college students • Interview with national security professor and author, Tom Nichols • 2017 World Series
17	17	"After School Satan Club"	October 31, 2017	0.35
Links between Trump associates and Russian officials • Religious after-school groups, Good News Club and After School Satan • Republicans' criticism against Donald Trump • Jefferies' comment on Halloween costumes and cultural appropriation
18	18	"Mark Cuban vs. Donald Trump"	November 7, 2017	0.46
Trump's inaction on domestic policy issues • Discussion with businessman Mark Cuban • Discriminations in the DOJ's "religious liberty" memo • NFL sponsor Papa John's claim that NFL protests are hurting pizza sales
19	19	"Roy Moore's Sexual Assault Allegations"	November 14, 2017	0.46
Roy Moore sexual abuse allegations • Technological unemployment • Interview with actor, director and activist Rob Reiner • Sean Hannity's fans boycott against Keurig
20	20	"Let's Talk About Guns"	November 21, 2017	0.53
Tax Cuts and Jobs Act of 2017 • Discussion and shooting range practice with former United States Navy sailor Rob O'Neill • History of Thanksgiving

=== Season 2 (2018) ===
No. overall	No. in season	Title	Original release date	US viewers (millions)
21	1	"Jim Attends the March for Our Lives"	March 27, 2018	0.39
Responses to the "March for Our Lives" anti-gun violence rallies • Discussion with attendees at "March for Our Lives" in San Diego • Non-violent civil disobedience • Fake news story about Jefferies' death in a car accident
22	2	"Day Drinking with the Press"	April 3, 2018	0.46
Sex trafficking in the United States • Discussion with a group of White House reporters • Controversy regarding a citizenship–related question in the 2020 United States Census • Twitter account of the transit system in Heathrow Terminal 5
23	3	"Scott Pruitt's Biggest Scandal"	April 10, 2018	0.37
2018 Oklahoma teachers' strike • Discussion with musician Noel Gallagher • Controversies surrounding the Administrator of the Environmental Protection Agency, Scott Pruitt • 2018 Australian ball-tampering scandal
24	4	"Comey's Nasty Little Tell-All"	April 17, 2018	0.35
2018 bombing of Damascus and Homs • James Comey's new autobiography, A Higher Loyalty: Truth, Lies, and Leadership • Interview with actress Malin Åkerman • Jefferies' comment on Fox News story about Melania Trump comforting a child who spilled a glass of water at the White House
25	5	"Ireland's Abortion Ban"	April 24, 2018	0.51
Human overpopulation • Irish abortion referendum, 2018 • Interviews with Irish pro-choice campaigner Tara Flynn and Irish pro-life campaigner Justin Barrett • Charter school in Texas asking students to list positive aspects of slavery
26	6	"Questioning Trump's North Korea Strategy"	May 1, 2018	0.38
April 2018 inter-Korean summit and the announcement of the June 2018 North Korea-United States summit • Jim gives advice to the Incel community, in light of April 23, 2018 van attack that killed ten people and injured fourteen, with the help of surprise guest Kerry King • Rory Scovel joins Jim to discuss the Poisoning of Sergei and Yulia Skripal and other suspicious deaths of Russian nationals with ties to the Putin regime • Brad Pitt returns as The Jim Jefferies Show weatherman
27	7	"The Exploitation of NFL Cheerleaders"	May 8, 2018	0.52
Objectification and unfair wages of NFL Cheerleaders • Interview with comedian Carol Burnett on the relationship between comedy and politics, and a look back at the climate of The Carol Burnett Show • Caravan of Central American asylum seekers stopped at the U.S. border • Jim parodies hedgefund manager Tom Steyer's ad calling for impeachment of President Donald Trump
28	8	"Learning About the Royal Family"	May 15, 2018	0.42
Confirmation hearings of Gina Haspel to CIA Director and her tenure at a CIA black site in Thailand known for using torture • Group interview with Majesty Magazine editor Ingrid Seward, chairman and creator of the British Monarchist Society Thomas J. Mace-Archer-Mills, and royal commentator Richard Fitzwilliams about the royal family and the royal wedding • Utah's "free-range parenting" law • Segment "Oh, Shut Up," about Sexuality educator Deanne Carson's suggestion that asking for permission to change the diaper of an infant is a way to introduce the idea of consent and bodily autonomy from birth
29	9	"Why Scared White People Keep Calling 911"	May 22, 2018	0.35
30	10	"The Sex Robot Revolution"	May 29, 2018	0.40
31	11	"Jordan Peterson & Sarah Silverman"	June 19, 2018	0.37
32	12	"The Crisis at the U.S.-Mexico Border"	June 26, 2018	0.36
33	13	"Judging the Supreme Court"	July 10, 2018	0.37
34	14	"America's Number One"	July 17, 2018	0.41
35	15	"Comic-Cons Diversity Problem"	July 24, 2018	0.31
36	16	"America Reaches Peak Outrage"	July 31, 2018	0.35
37	17	"The 1D Brain Behind 3D-Printed Guns"	August 7, 2018	0.32
38	18	"Life During Trump's Topsy-Turvy Presidency"	August 14, 2018	0.33
39	19	"What Is QAnon?"	August 21, 2018	0.29
40	20	"Jim's Deep Dive Into Religion"	August 28, 2018	0.31
41	21	"Nike's Ad Campaign Stirs Up Controversy"	September 18, 2018	0.41
42	22	"Republicans Stand By Brett Kavanaugh"	September 25, 2018	0.36
43	23	"America's Racist Criminal Justice System"	October 2, 2018	0.33
44	24	"The Exploitation of Victimhood"	October 9, 2018	0.33
45	25	"The Downward Spiral of Climate Change"	October 16, 2018	0.36
46	26	"Why Healthy Living Is Impossible"	October 23, 2018	0.34
47	27	"How Right-Wing Rhetoric Leads to Violence"	October 30, 2018	0.35
48	28	"Third-Party Debate: The Best Of The Rest"	November 6, 2018	0.30
49	29	"Trump Wages War Against Journalists"	November 13, 2018	0.34
50	30	"Jim Becomes a U.S. Citizen"	November 20, 2018	0.32

=== Season 3 (2019) ===
No. overall	No. in season	Title	Original release date	U.S. viewers (millions)
51	1	"The Rise of White Nationalism"	March 19, 2019	0.42
52	2	"The Hidden Dangers of Vast Nuclear Arsenals"	March 26, 2019	0.37
53	3	"How Chicago Became Central to the Gun Debate"	April 2, 2019	0.34
54	4	"The Extra Hurdles for Trans Athletes"	April 9, 2019	0.40
55	5	"Jim Goes on an Anti-Poaching Safari"	April 16, 2019	0.40
56	6	"Jim's Guide to Growing Old and Dying"	April 23, 2019	0.27
57	7	"Addicted to Everything"	April 30, 2019	0.28
58	8	"Giving Kids in Foster Care a Leg Up"	May 7, 2019	0.30
59	9	"Dividing the United States"	May 14, 2019	0.32
60	10	"The Cost of Trading Away Freedom"	May 21, 2019	0.31
61	11	"Americans Stopped Caring About Privacy"	September 17, 2019	N/A
62	12	"Canada's Controversial Football Team"	September 24, 2019	N/A
63	13	"Jim Takes On Cancel Culture"	October 1, 2019	N/A
64	14	"The Decline of Sex in Japan"	October 8, 2019	N/A
65	15	"Diving Into the Trump Impeachment Inquiry"	October 15, 2019	N/A
66	16	"Jim's Ride-Along with His Cop Brother"	October 22, 2019	N/A
67	17	"Legal Prostitution vs. Sex Trafficking"	October 29, 2019	N/A
68	18	"Why Americans Fear the Wrong Things"	November 5, 2019	N/A
69	19	"Are Japanese B-Stylers Racist?"	November 12, 2019	N/A
70	20	"There Are Too Many Choices"	November 19, 2019	N/A
