= Mark Pastin =

Professional biography of Professor Mark Pastin, PhD

- Born: July 6, 1949 (age 77)
- Citizenship: United States
- Occupations: Author, professor, and ethicist
- Website: markpastin.com

Mark Pastin (born July 6, 1949) is an American author, professor and ethicist. He specializes in the field of ethics and compliance. He is the founder and president of the Council of Ethical Organizations. He also served as the founding director of the Lincoln Center for Ethics and Professor of Management at the W.P. Carey School of Business at Arizona State University.

== Early life and career ==
Mark Pastin was born in Ellwood City, Pennsylvania on July 6, 1949. In 1966, Pastin attended the University of Pittsburgh where he studied philosophy and graduated with a BA. Shortly after graduating summa cum laude from University of Pittsburgh, he enrolled into Harvard University where he obtained a PhD in philosophy between 1970 and 1973.

Since 1983, he has provided guidance to major corporations and government bodies worldwide. Pastin serves as the president of the Health Ethics Trust, a non-profit organization based in Alexandria, Virginia that focuses on addressing ethics and compliance issues in healthcare.

In 1994, Pastin co-founded the Health Ethics Trust, known for its practical approach to ethics and compliance challenges. He is also an author of multiple books, including The Hard Problems of Management; Gaining the Ethics Edge and Make an Ethical Difference: Tools for Better Action. In addition to his role at the Health Ethics Trust, Pastin has been involved in supporting research on ethics and compliance issues through initiatives like the Healthcare: Best Compliance Practices Forum. Pastin has also consulted for top companies like ARCO, IRS, National Health Laboratories, Nestle, Glaxo Wellcome (GSK), Cities Service, American Express, GE, Motorola, and Champion International.

=== Academic career ===
Pastin began his academic journey as a Teaching fellow at Harvard University from 1971 to 1973. He then transitioned to roles at various institutions, including Indiana University, where he served as an Assistant professor from 1973 to 1976 and later as an Associate professor from 1976 to 1978. He served as Professor of Management from 1980 until 1995 as the W.P. Carey School of Business at Arizona State University.

In 1978, Pastin took on a Visiting Associate Professor position at the University of Michigan, further expanding his academic experience. His dedication to teaching and research led him to Johns Hopkins University, where he became a valuable member of the faculty in the Management Science Program and a Research fellow at the Center for Metropolitan Planning and Research from 1980 to 1986.

Pastin also held a Professor position at the University of Maryland in 1980. Since 1995, he has served as an Emeritus Professor of Management at Arizona State University, where he has mentored several students and colleagues.

Pastin has made significant contributions to the field of ethics and compliance.

== Selected publications ==
- "No Ethics, No Change" Lessons in Cultural Change: The Utility Industry Experience, Public Utilities Reports Inc., 1994.
- "The Reconstruction of Value," The Canadian Journal of Philosophy, Vol. 3 (November, 1975), pp. 357–93.
- "The Ethics of Business Ethics," Proceedings of the Middle Atlantic Assoc. of Colleges of Business Administration, edited by E. Brucker (1981), pp. 8–11.
- "The Integrating Role of Ethics in Effective Management" Ethics and the Marketplace, edited by James B. Wilbur (SUNY, 1983), pp. 159–163.
- "Bits, Bytes and Ethics," Electronics West (May, 1985), pp. 23 – 27.
- The hard problems of management: Gaining the ethics edge.
- CI Lewis's radical foundationalism.
- Pastin, Mark; Harrison, Jeffrey (September 1987). "Social Responsibility in the Hollow Corporation". Business & Society Review (63): 54.
- Pastin, Mark (1984). "Ethics as an integrating force in management". Journal of Business Ethics. 3 (4): 293–304. doi:10.1007/bf00381752.
- A rejoinder on actions and de re belief.
- The multi-perspectival theory of knowledge
- Counterfactuals in epistemology.
- The Reconstruction of Value.

=== Books ===
- The Three Keys to Ethical Organizations.
- Make an Ethical Difference.
- The Hard Problems of Management: Gaining the Ethics Edge.
- The Compliance Case Study Library.
