= Karen Gibson =

Karen Gibson could refer to:

- Karen Gibson (choir conductor), British musician
- Karen Gibson (Sergeant at Arms), U.S. Army general and government official
