= Ross Benson =

Scottish journalist and gossip columnist

- Born: Sydney Ross Benson; 29 September 1948; Newton Mearns, East Renfrewshire, Scotland
- Died: 8 March 2005 (aged 56); London
- Education: Gordonstoun
- Occupation: Journalist
- Spouse(s): Beverly Rose; Zoë Bennett; Ingrid Seward
- Children: 3
- Awards: Edgar Wallace Award for Fine Writing (London Press Club)

Sydney Ross Benson (29 September 1948 – 8 March 2005) was a Scottish journalist and gossip columnist known for his personal style. Educated at Gordonstoun School in Scotland, he worked for London Life magazine after leaving school before joining the Daily Mail newspaper as the deputy diary editor at the age of 20. His uncle, the photographer Harry Benson, was an early mentor.

In 1971, Benson moved to the Daily Express newspaper as deputy diary editor; he was appointed deputy foreign editor in 1975. In 1978, he travelled to Los Angeles as the paper's West Coast correspondent. He returned to London in 1982 in the position of Chief Foreign Correspondent and was named as International Reporter of the Year in the British Press Awards in 1983.

In 1988, Benson was given his own gossip column to rival that of Nigel Dempster of the Daily Mail.

Benson was the ghost writer for George Best's autobiography, The Good, the Bad and the Bubbly, published in 1990. Further books followed; Paul McCartney: Behind the myth in 1992 and Charles: The untold story in 1993.

In 1997, Benson returned to the Daily Mail as a foreign correspondent, winning a London Press Club Award in 2004 for his work covering Iraq.

Married three times, Benson had three children. His last marriage in 1987 was to writer Ingrid Seward, the editor of Majesty magazine.

A keen Chelsea supporter and season ticket holder, he watched them beat Barcelona at Chelsea's home ground on the eve of his death. He died in his sleep at his London home on 8 March 2005 of a suspected heart attack.
