= Chiva (charity) =

British HIV/AIDS charity

The Children's HIV Association (Chiva) is a British charity which supports children, young people and families living with HIV.

In 2008 it worked with the British Medical Association to publish a joint set of guidelines for the management of HIV in pregnant women.

It was one of the seven charities nominated by Prince Harry and Meghan Markle to receive donations in lieu of wedding presents when the couple married on 19 May 2018.

A documentary Freedom To Be about 15 years of Chiva's summer camp for children with HIV was a finalist in the 2025 Smiley Charity Film Awards, and Safe With Me, about two young people meeting at the camp, was shortlisted for the same award. Mercy Ngulube winner of the 2017, Diana Award for youth leadership, works as a peer counsellor with the organisation.
