= Cory Hahn =

American baseball player and executive (born 1991)

- Outfielder
- Born: December 11, 1991 (age 33); Corona, California, U.S.
- Bats: Left Throws: Left

Cory Hahn (born December 11, 1991) is an American former college baseball player and current professional baseball executive with the Arizona Diamondbacks. He was paralyzed from the chest down during the third game of his freshman season at Arizona State in 2011. Since then, Cory has won awards for his endurance, positive attitude, and charitable works. He was drafted in the 34th round of the 2013 Major League Baseball draft by the Diamondbacks.

== Early life and playing career ==
Hahn graduated from the Mater Dei High School in Santa Ana, California in 2010, where he earned four varsity letters and captained the baseball in 2010. He won several awards, including being named a first team All-American Orange County player of the year and Los Angeles Times player of the year in 2010 and first Team All-League and first team All-State in 2009. He also played on the national under-18 team that won the COPABE "AAA" Pan American Junior Championships. With the American national team, he batted 5-for-15 in six games and played alongside several future Major League Baseball (MLB) players including Bryce Harper and Manny Machado.

Hahn was picked in the 26th round (784th overall) by the San Diego Padres in the 2010 MLB draft but chose to play for the Arizona State Sun Devils instead of signing professionally.

During the first inning of his third game, he slid head-first into second base and broke his neck after colliding into a fielder's knee. He underwent surgery that night and did not play competitively again.

== Post-playing career and personal life ==
After his injury, Hahn left school for one year but eventually continued with the Sun Devils, becoming a student-coach. In college, Hahn met Arizona Diamondbacks general manager Kevin Towers, beginning his relationship with the team. Hahn graduated from Arizona State in May 2014 with a business degree from the W.P. Carey School of Business and prepared to become a scout for the Arizona Diamondbacks.

The Diamondbacks drafted Hahn in the 34th round of the 2013 MLB draft, matching his uniform number as a player. He began working for the team. He is currently the assistant director of professional scouting, following roles as the assistant director of player personnel starting in November 2021 and coordinator of professional scouting beginning in December 2016. He won Baseball America's Trailblazer of the Year award at the end of 2024.

Hahn's parents, Dale and Christine Hahn, live in Arizona. He has a younger brother, Jason.

Hahn started the charity Project 34 with former teammate Trevor Williams. The organization has raised more than $600,000 to support people with spinal cord injuries.

== Awards and honors ==
- Wilma Rudolph Student Athlete Achievement Award in 2013 by the National Association of Academic Advisors for Athletics
- His number 34 is honored by ASU in right field at Phoenix Municipal Stadium, where it appears as the "34" in the 334-foot distance marker
