= Andrew Wantuck =

American showrunner and producer (born 1979)

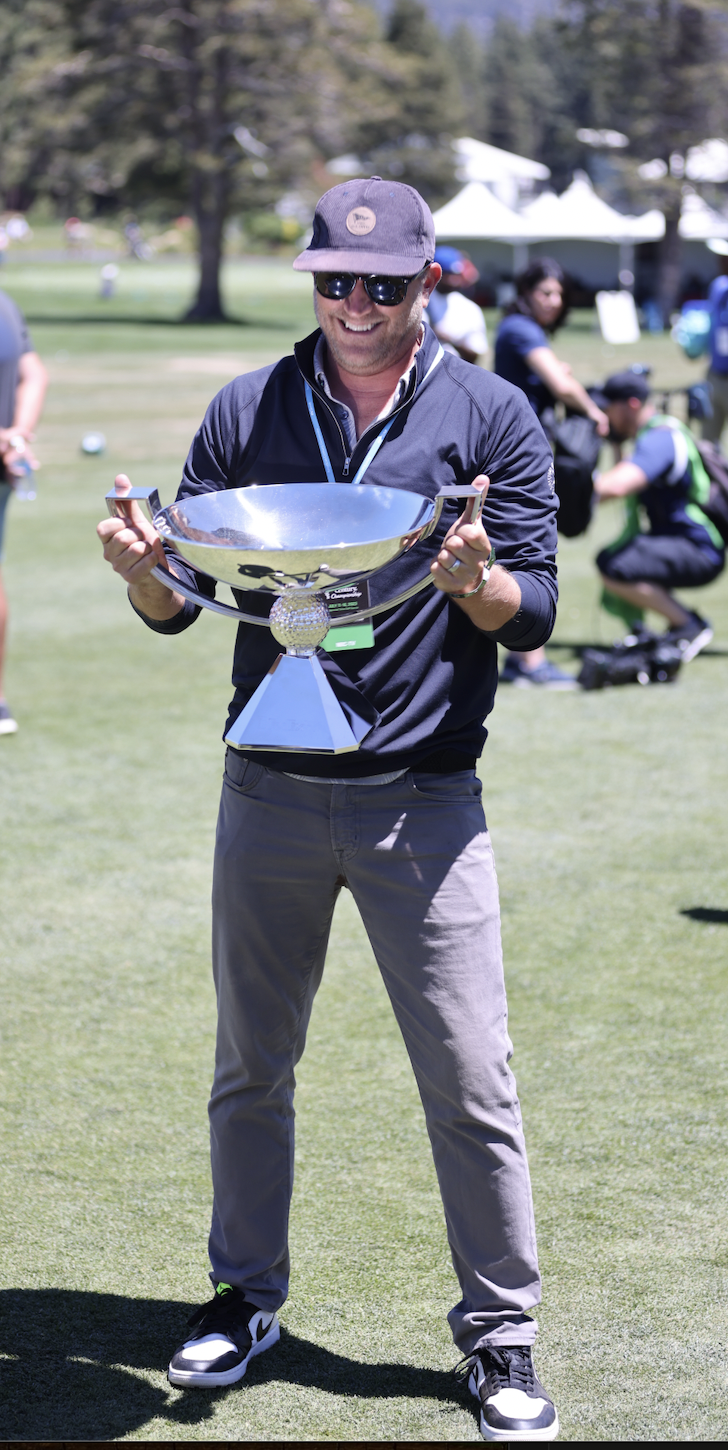
- NBC Sports 2022
- Born: Andrew Scott Wantuck; November 18, 1979 (age 46); Newark, New York, U.S.
- Education: Arizona State University

Comedy career
- Years active: 2002–present
- Medium: Streaming; Television; Commercials; Social Media
- Genres: Observational comedy; sports; sarcasm; satire; golf; improv comedy; sketch comedy
- Website: bettercontentcompany.com

Andrew Wantuck is an American showrunner, producer and founder of Better Content Co. He is best known for his work with NBC Sports, Golf Channel and Comedy Central. He has been a producer on Tosh.0 (2010–2017), The Jim Jefferies Show (2017–2020), The Conor Moore Show (2020–2023), Drive with the Green starring Niall Horan (2025), Better Off with Hally Leadbetter (2023–2024), and unCOMMON: Building a Boston Sports Team with Rory McIlroy and Keegan Bradley for which he won a New England Emmy award for Outstanding Sports Program.

== Early life and education ==
Andrew Wantuck was born in Newark, New York, and grew up in Farmington Hills, Michigan, after his family relocated there during elementary school. Wantuck attended North Farmington High School and later pursued his higher education at Arizona State University (ASU). He graduated from the W. P. Carey School of Business. During his time at ASU, Wantuck attempted to walk-on to the Arizona State Sun Devils men's golf team, was a member of Sigma Phi Epsilon, and was actively involved in improv and sketch comedy. He was a member and director of Barren Mind Improv and The Farce Side Comedy Hour. Wantuck and his fellow performers, including Jessica Makinson, Nic Wegener and Ithamar Enriquez, received support from ASU to participate in the 1999 Chicago Improv Festival hosted by Charna Halpern, where they studied under Amy Poehler, Matt Besser, Ian Roberts and Matt Walsh of the Upright Citizen's Brigade. Notable alumni of ASU's The Farce Side Comedy Hour include David Spade, Jonathan Kimmel and Jimmy Kimmel.

== Career ==
Andrew Wantuck's career in the entertainment industry began as the director of marketing at The Comedy & Magic Club in Hermosa Beach, California. He also contributed to the Easy Reader newspaper, where he published a weekly column called "Comedy Corner," featuring interviews with prominent comedians such as George Carlin, Mort Sahl, Gabriel Iglesias, Kathleen Madigan, Ray Romano, Ian Bagg, Sebastian Maniscalco, Joe Rogan, Jo Koy, and Tom Segura.

In 2010, Wantuck started working as a producer for Viacom on the Comedy Central show Tosh.0, where he spent seven years. Following that, he served as a co-executive producer for three seasons on The Jim Jefferies Show on Comedy Central. In 2020, Wantuck became a showrunner for NBC Sports, Golf Channel and GolfPass. Through his production company, Gopher Productions and VP of Content, Fran Solomita, they created and produced shows with GolfPass. These include The Conor Moore Show, Road Trippin' with James Davis, and On Tour On Course featuring Jim Jefferies, Brian Regan and Ron White. In 2023, Wantuck created and produced Better Off with Hally Leadbetter, for NBC's GolfPass. The show gained immediate attention with its sketch The All Female Country Club, which went viral on multiple social platforms.

== Super Bowl Commercial ==
Scott Zabielski, along with Andrew Wantuck, produced "Middle Seat" for the 2015 Doritos Crash the Super Bowl contest. The spot starring David Hoffman and Michelle LaRue was produced for ~$2,000 and wound up winning the one million grand prize. "Middle Seat" is considered one of the top 20 best Super Bowl commercials of all time by The Sporting News and the number one 30-second spot in 2015 by USA Today's Ad Meter.

== Personal life ==
As of 2024, Andrew Wantuck is married, has three children, a rescue dog and currently resides in Carlsbad, California. Wantuck supports Big Brothers Big Sisters of Big Sky, Montana by booking the comedy show at their annual charity event. He also supports the Mary Angela DiGiovanni Disaster Preparedness Fund through The University of Michigan.

== Television credits ==
Year	Show	Network	Title
2010–2017	Tosh.0	Comedy Central	Producer
2017–2020	The Jim Jefferies Show	Comedy Central	Co-Executive Producer
2020–2023	The Conor Moore Show	Golf Channel / GolfPass	Executive Producer / Showrunner
2021	Golf Road Trippin with James Davis	Peacock / GolfPass	Executive Producer / Showrunner
2022–2023	On Tour On Course	GolfPass	Executive Producer / Showrunner
2023–2024	Better Off with Hally Leadbetter	Peacock / GolfPass	Executive Producer / Showrunner
2024-2025	unCOMMON: Building a Boston Sports Team	Peacock / GolfPass	Executive Producer / Producer
2025	Drive with the Green starring Rory McIlroy, Keegan Bradley and Niall Horan	GolfPass	Executive Producer / Director
