= Claire Ptak =

American baker and food writer

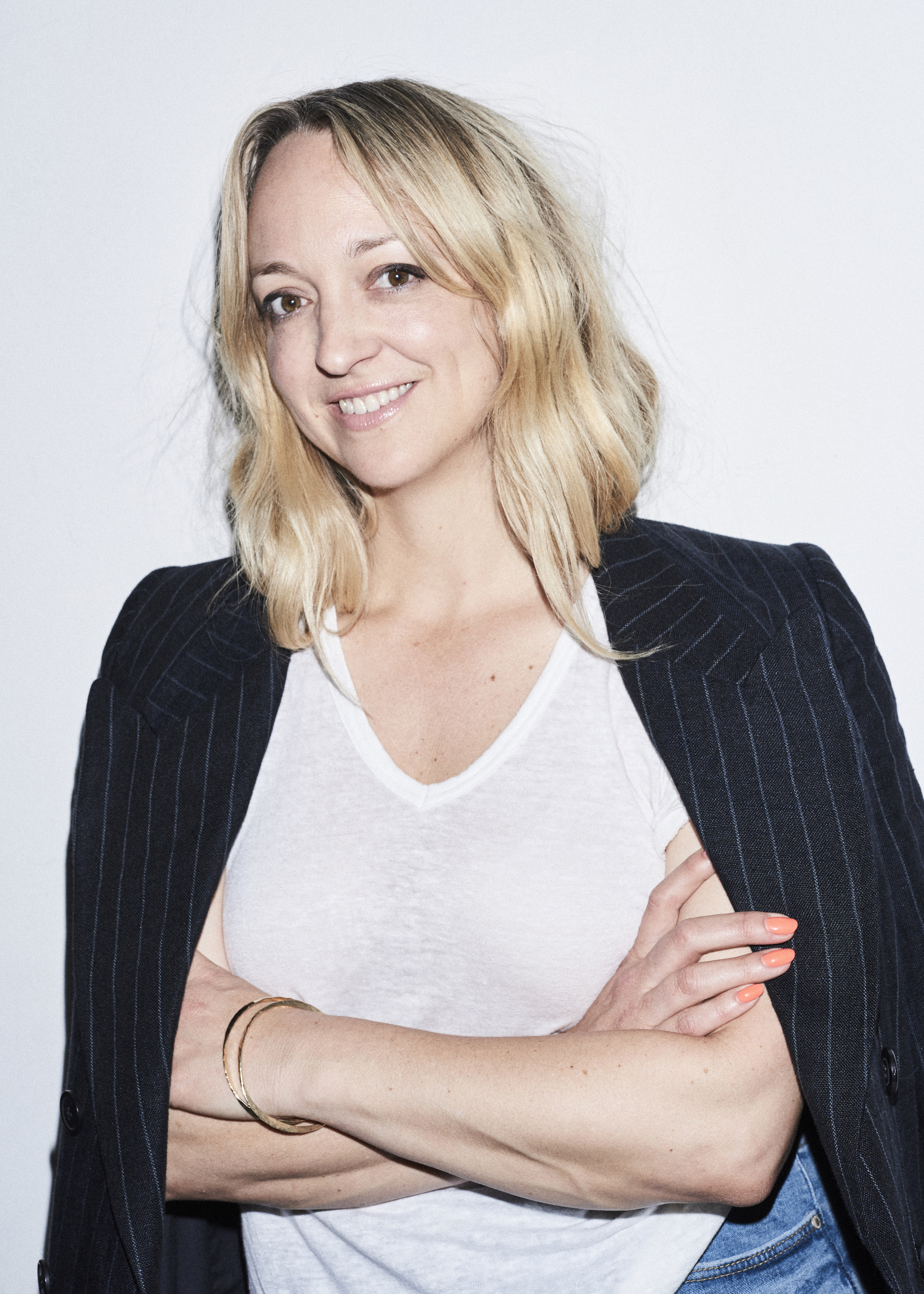
- Ptak in 2018
- Education: Mills College
- Children: 1

Claire Ptak is an American baker, food writer, and food stylist. She owns and runs a bakery-café Violet Cakes in London's East End. In addition, she has published an array of cookbooks and written a food column for The Guardian and The Observer. She is widely known for having baked the royal wedding cake for the wedding of the Duke and Duchess of Sussex – a layered sponge filled and covered with a lemon and elderflower buttercream icing.

== Early life ==
Claire Ptak grew up in Inverness, California, where she learned to bake with her mother and grandmother. She baked a cake for a friend's wedding when she was just seventeen and worked at local bakers, Bovine Bakery and Cakework. She went on to study film at Mills College in California and worked as a film and fashion assistant in San Francisco following her graduation.

== Career ==
Ptak served as a pastry chef at Chez Panisse, where she was mentored by Alice Waters for three years. In 2005, she moved to London and quickly became a food stylist for celebrity chefs such as Yotam Ottolenghi, Nigella Lawson, and Jamie Oliver. Alongside her food styling, Claire writes a food column for The Guardian and has published five cookbooks. In 2008, Ptak began running a stall at Broadway Market in East London, where she sold cookies, pies, and cakes made at home with fresh buttercream flavoured with seasonal ingredients. Following two years at the market, Ptak expanded the business out of her home and moved the Violet Cakes stall to a derelict building in Hackney, which she renovated into a bakery-café. Initially, she planned to just use it for cooking and baking, but local enthusiasm encouraged her to open it as a shop and café.

=== Royal involvement ===
Violet Cakes was commissioned to bake the cake for the wedding of Prince Harry and Meghan Markle in 2018 since Markle had read Ptak's book The Violet Bakery Cookbook, and interviewed her for her lifestyle blog, The Tig. Ptak brought six different samples to Kensington Palace for the couple to taste and they selected the Amalfi lemon and elderflower flavour; an unconventional choice which was Ptak's own favourite. The cake took a total of five days to prepare, with the final touches such as fresh flowers being added during the ceremony. Many of the ingredients, such as the elderflower syrup, were sourced from the Queen's estate at Sandringham.

Ptak made the cake for Lilibet Mountbatten-Windsor, Prince Harry and Meghan's daughter, for her first birthday held in London in June 2022.

== Personal life ==
Ptak has a daughter (born 2016) with her ex-husband. Ptak became a naturalised British citizen in 2022.

== Bibliography ==
Ptak has written and co-written several cookery books over the last decade. Her works include:

- The Whoopie Pie Book (2012)
- Leon: Baking & Puddings (2013)
- Boiled Sweets and Hard Candy (2013)
- Home-Made Chocolates and Truffles (2014)
- The Old-Fashioned Hand-Made Sweet Shop Recipes Book (2015)
- The Violet Bakery Cookbook (2015)
