= Harry Benson =

Scottish photographer

Harry Benson CBE
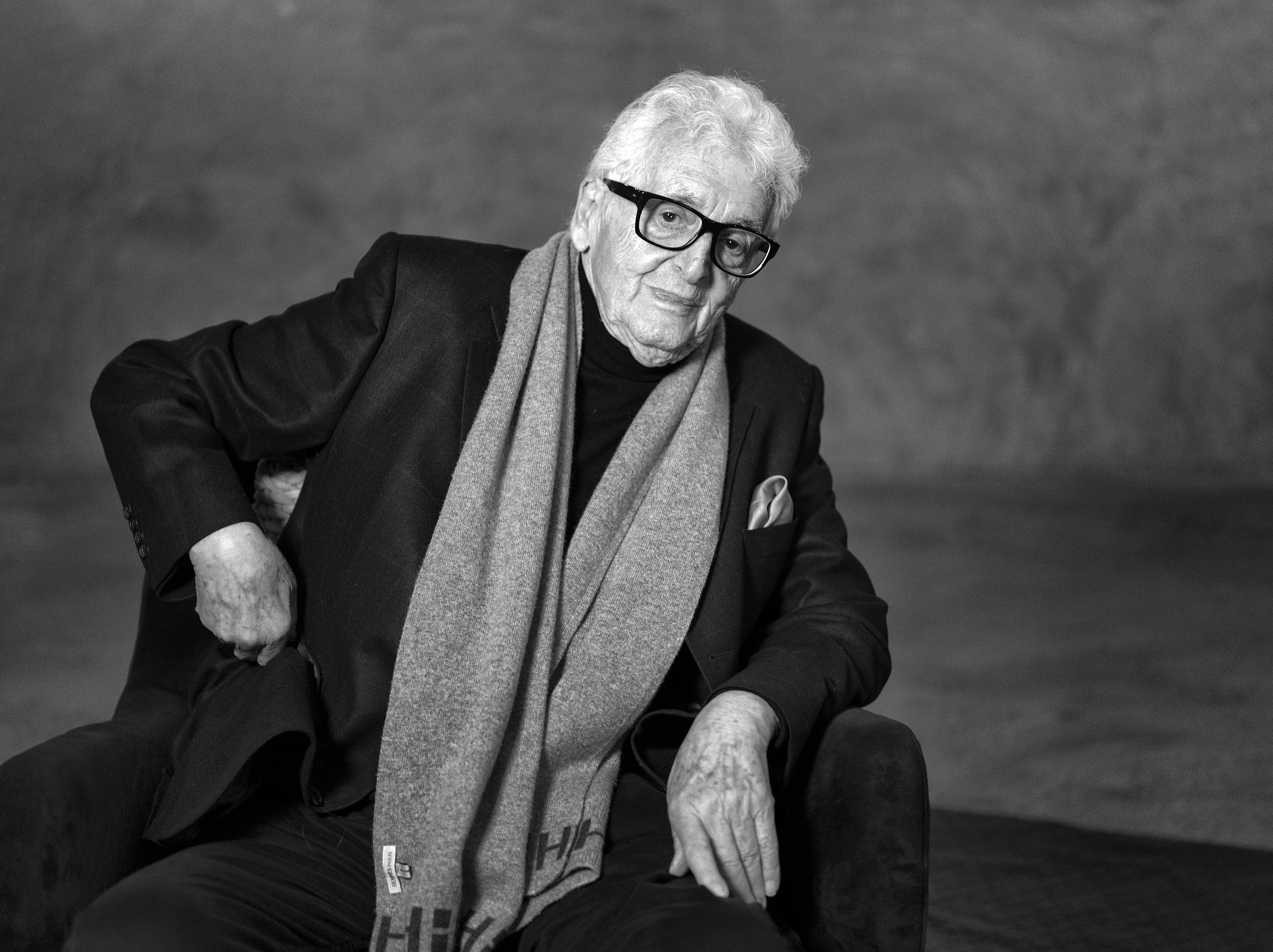
- Harry Benson in 2019 in San Francisco
- Born: Harry James Benson; 2 December 1929 (age 96); Glasgow, Scotland
- Occupation: Photographer
- Notable work: The Beatles inaugural trip to the United States (1964)
- Awards: Lifetime Achievement Award, Scottish Press Photography Awards
- Website: harrybenson.com

Harry James Benson CBE (born 2 December 1929) is a Scottish photographer. His photographs of celebrities have been published in magazines. He has published several books and won a number of prominent awards.

== Life and work ==
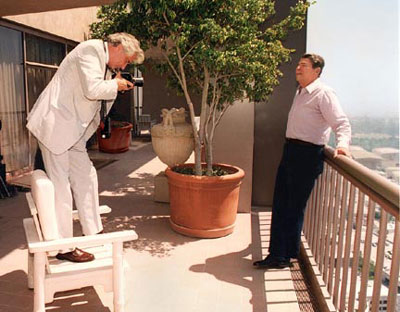
President Ronald Reagan poses for Benson at The Century Plaza Hotel in Los Angeles (1987, photo by Pete Souza)

Benson was born in Glasgow and raised in Troon, Scotland.

His pictures have appeared in Life, Vanity Fair, and The New Yorker. He took over a hundred cover shots for People.

Benson was assigned to travel with The Beatles on their inaugural American tour in 1964. One of his most recognisable images shows the band in a gleeful pillow fight at the hotel Georges V in Paris. Other celebrities Benson has photographed include Bobby Fischer, Michael Jackson, who allowed him access to his bedroom, and Elizabeth Taylor, whom Benson photographed before and after her brain surgery. He has also photographed political figures, including every U.S. president since Dwight D. Eisenhower, and covered war zones. Benson was standing next to Robert F. Kennedy when the senator was shot on 5 June 1968 and has remarked on the difficulty of steeling himself to document the historic moment: "I kept telling myself 'this is for history, pull yourself together, fail tomorrow, not today.'"

Benson has been the subject of many exhibitions, including one organised by the Scottish National Portrait Gallery at the National Portrait Gallery of the Smithsonian Institution.

Benson was the recipient of the 2005 Lucie Award for Lifetime Achievement in Portrait Photography and the 2005 American Photo Award for Photography. He has twice been named Magazine Photographer of the Year by the National Press Photographers Association (1981 and 1985). He was presented with a Lifetime Achievement Award at the Scottish Press Photography Awards in April 2006. Benson was awarded an Honorary Fellowship of the Royal Photographic Society in 2009. Benson was appointed Commander of the Order of the British Empire (CBE) in the 2009 New Year Honours. In 2014 he took an official photographic portrait of the Queen, commissioned by the Scottish National Portrait Gallery. This was more than fifty years after his first portrait of the Queen, taken when she opened a coal mine in 1957.

He is the subject of a BBC Scotland documentary titled Photography: Harry Benson (1985), directed by Ken MacGregor and written by William McIlvanney and of the 2015 documentary Shoot First directed by Matthew Miele and Justin Bare.

He and his wife, Gigi, have two daughters: the American actress Wendy Benson and Tessa Benson. Harry has 3 grandchildren and lives in New York and Palm Beach, Florida. His nephew was the journalist Ross Benson.

== Collections ==
- International Photography Hall of Fame - St. Louis, MO

== Exhibitions ==
- 2007 - Harry Benson: Being There, National Portrait Gallery, Smithsonian - Washington, DC
- 2019 - The World as Seen by Harry Benson, Holden Luntz Gallery - Palm Beach, Florida
- 2019 - Behind the Scenes, Staley Wise Gallery - New York, New York.
- 2020 - Casual Conversations: The Vanity Fair Talks (Harry Benson and David Friend), Annenberg Photography Space - Los Angeles, California
- 2022-23 - Harry Benson: Four Stories, Addison Gallery of American Art, Andover, Massachusetts

== Books ==
- Harry Benson: 50 Years in Pictures. 2001. ISBN 0-8109-4171-6
- Once there was a way... Photographs of the Beatles. 2003. ISBN 0-8109-4643-2
- Harry Benson's America. 2005. ISBN 0-8109-5896-1
- Being There: Harry Benson's Fifty Years of Photojournalism. 2006. ISBN 1-903278-82-1
- Harry Benson's Glasgow. 2007. ISBN 978-1-84502-236-5
- Harry Benson. The Beatles. Cologne: Taschen, 2013. ISBN 978-3-8365-3322-5
