= British Monarchist Society =

Monarchist organization

The British Monarchist Society was a non-partisan monarchist organization started by Thomas Mace-Archer-Mills in 2012 as a private limited company under guarantee. This organization was created supporting the monarchy of the United Kingdom.

Among its patrons were Lord Rana, Lord Selkirk of Douglas, and politicians Pauline Latham and Marco Longhi.

This organization was legally dissolved in 2019.

== See also ==
- The Royalists (organisation)
- Ingrid Seward
