= Thomas Mace-Archer-Mills =

American commentator on the British royal family

Thomas James Mace-Archer-Mills
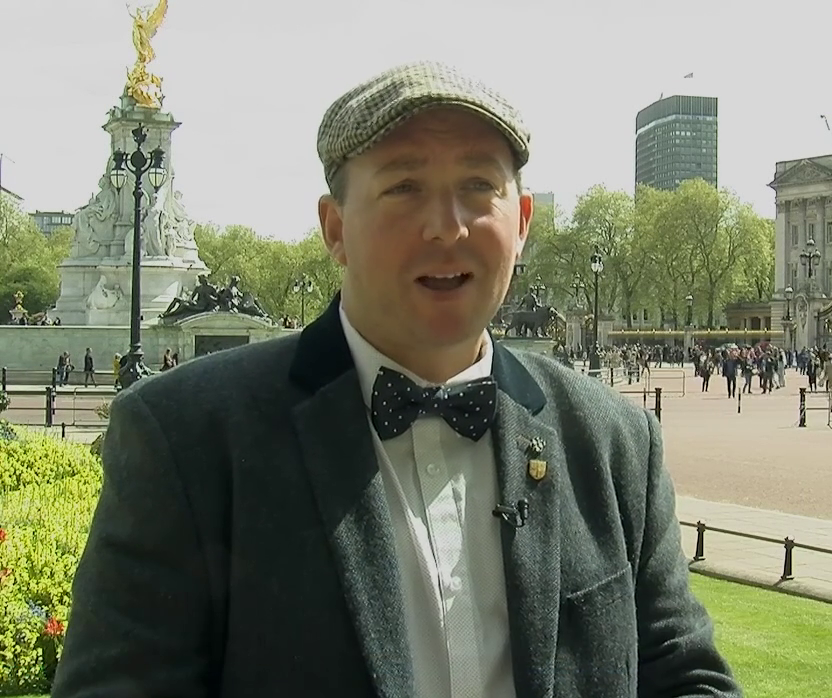
- Born: Thomas James Muscatello; 18 August 1979; Glens Falls, Warren County, New York, United States
- Died: 2 January 2023 (aged 43)
- Other names: Thomas James Muscatello-DeLecroix
- Education: SUNY Adirondack; NHL Stenden University of Applied Sciences; Coastal Carolina University
- Years active: 2012–2023
- Known for: Commentary on the British royal family

Thomas James Mace-Archer-Mills (born Thomas James Muscatello, 18 August 1979 – 2 January 2023) was an American commentator on the British royal family. In 2012 he founded the British Monarchist Society, an organization that supports the monarchy of the United Kingdom.

He was interviewed as a supporter of the British monarchy in both domestic and international media including BBC Radio, The Economist, Voice of America, Europe 1, SRG SSR, Comedy Central and NTV Russia. During the wedding of The Duke and Duchess of Sussex, he provided commentary for the French news channel BFM TV.

On 31 May 2018, the Wall Street Journal conducted a background investigation into Mace-Archer-Mills, resulting in an article containing accusations that he was a charlatan.

== Background ==
Mace-Archer-Mills was born in Glens Falls, New York, and grew up in Bolton Landing, New York. His father, Thomas Sr. is of Italian descent. In his youth, he gained an interest in British history and had visited the United Kingdom extensively as a teenager. While at high school, his anglophilia was so strong that he started to use the phrase "God save the Queen" and also attempted to speak in a British accent. Mace-Archer-Mills began using the accent while he was working on a high school production of the musical Oliver! in which he played Mr. Sowerberry. He said this voice has now completely replaced his native Upstate New York accent, even when he visited his family back in America.

He studied politics and history at Coastal Carolina University, and after graduating became a real estate agent in New York State under the auspices of Imperial Group International, where he used the name Thomas J Muscatello-DeLacroix. Later, he moved back to South Carolina into the town of Murrells Inlet as a brokerage owner. He eventually settled in to London in 2012 and founded the British Monarchist Society. In 2018, he stated he was applying for British citizenship. He has written and published two coffee-table books about the British monarchy and cocktails, To the Queen: A Royal Drinkology in 2012 and Their Majesties’ Mixers: A Royal Drinkology in 2017. In 2018, to celebrate the wedding of the Sussexes he got into the world of cryptocurrencies, by launching a royal-themed cryptocurrency called "Crown Royal" which was offered at 500 Royl to one Ethereum.

== British Monarchist Society ==
The British Monarchist Society was a self-described non-partisan monarchist organization started by Mace-Archer-Mills in 2011 or 2012 as a private limited company under guarantee. In 2017, Mace-Archer-Mills and the society were involved in a conference called with the Qatar Global Security & Stability Conference, which was set-up by London-based Qatari opposition leader Khalid Al-Hail. The conference in question notably included speakers such as Conservative MP Daniel Kaczynski. Mace-Archer-Mills left as a company director of the society in June 2020, but continued as editor and owner of the society's magazine Crown & Country.

In June 2021 one of the patrons of the society, Conservative MP Joy Morrissey, together with the society, proposed that a framed picture of the monarch should be in every home, company, and institute in the country as part of a Britishness campaign. This proposal, which was announced in the same week as the "One Britain One Nation" children's singing initiative, was swiftly condemned by commentators saying that it was jingoistic and silly.

== Death ==
Mace-Archer-Mills died on 2 January 2023, at the age of 43.

== See also ==
- International Monarchist League – The main British monarchist pressure group
- Republic - The main British republican organisation
