= StreetGames =

StreetGames is a United Kingdom-based 'sport for development' charity. It works with a network of over 1,400 local community organisations and provides programmes for young people in underserved communities. The programmes relate to issues such as mental health, food poverty, crime, and unemployment.

StreetGames uses the Doorstep Sport delivery model, which includes the provision of physical activity at specified times, locations, and price points. The approach involves informal sports activities delivered by community organizations in low-income areas. The model includes sports participation programmes for young people.

StreetGames is registered as a charity with the Charity Commission (registered charity number 1113542) and as a company limited by guarantee with the Registrar of Companies (registered company number 5384487).

== Background ==
StreetGames was founded in 2007 by Jane Ashworth, who was appointed O.B.E. in 2011 "For Services to Community Sport". The founding of the charity was inspired by the success of joint work conducted by The FA, Football Foundation and other agencies working within underserved communities.

Since that time, young people and projects across the UK have benefitted from StreetGames' Doorstep Sport programme. Additional successes have included the female-focused Us Girls programme, launched in 2011, and the Fit and Fed campaign, which tackles issues of holiday hunger, inactivity and isolation.

In 2022, StreetGames launched a new 10-year strategy which lays out a road map to expand Doorstep Sport provision throughout the country and grow opportunities for young people in underserved communities to participate in sport.

StreetGames was one of the seven charities nominated by Prince Harry and Meghan Markle to receive donations in lieu of wedding presents when the couple married on 19 May 2018.
