= Angelo Kinicki =

American academic

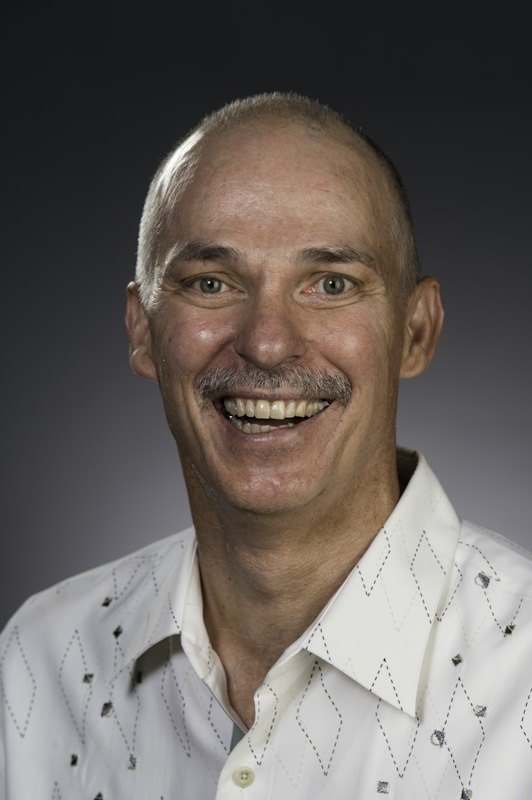
Kinicki Angelo

Angelo Kinicki is an Arizona State University, Professor Emeritus of management, the recipient of the Weatherup/Overby Chair in Leadership, an author and consultant. After joining the faculty in 1982, receiving his doctorate in business administration from Kent State University, he became one of the Dean's Council of 100 Distinguished Scholars at the W. P. Carey School of Business.

His primary research interests include leadership, organizational culture/climate, coping with job loss, organizational change and organizational effectiveness. His research scholarship is demonstrated via the 80+ articles in a variety of academic journals. Additionally, he is co-author of seven textbooks. Kinicki has served on the editorial review boards for the Academy of Management Journal, the Journal of Management, and the Journal of Vocational Behavior. Kinicki has been an active member of the Academy of Management, including service as a representative at large for the Organizational Behavior (OB) division, member of the Best Paper Award committee for both the OB and Human Resources (HR) divisions, chair of the committee to select the best publication in the Academy of Management Journal, and program committee reviewer for the OB and HR divisions.

Kinicki has received several researcher and teacher awards, including: best research paper award from the Organizational Behavior division of the Academy of Management, the All Time Best Reviewer Award (June 1996 - June 1999) and the Excellent Reviewer Award (1997–1998) from the Academy of Management Journal, and four teaching awards from Arizona State University (John W. Teets Outstanding Graduate Teacher Award, Outstanding Undergraduate Teaching Excellence Award, Outstanding Graduate Teaching Excellence Award, and Outstanding Executive Development Teaching Excellence Award).
