= Scotty's (charity) =

British children's charity

Scotty's Little Soldiers
- Founded: 2010
- Purpose: Supporting children whose parents have died while serving in the armed forces
- Location: United Kingdom
- Website: www.scottys.org.uk

Scotty's, previously and formally Scotty's Little Soldiers, is a British charity originally supporting children whose parents have died while serving in the armed forces but now supporting "anyone affected by a military-connected bereavement". Its logo carries the text "Scotty's the military bereavement charity". It was founded in 2010 by Nikki Scott after her husband Lee "Scotty" Scott was killed in 2009 while on active service in Afghanistan with the 2nd Royal Tank Regiment.

As of 2018 the charity supported children and young people who had lost a parent while they were serving in the regular or reserve army, navy or air force, whether on active service or through accident or illness, and including those medically discharged before their death. It provided three programmes of support: "Smiles" offered outings and gifts; "Support" helped with counselling and family support; and "Strides" offered grants and assistance for education and personal development.

In 2013 a match between teams representing the charity and the armed forces claimed a world record for the longest rugby union football match ever, at 24 hours 50 minutes. In 2014 Tesco introduced a range of children's clothes based on the charity's logo.

It was one of the seven charities nominated by Prince Harry and Meghan Markle to receive donations in lieu of wedding presents when the couple married on 19 May 2018.
