= W. P. Carey School of Business =

Business school of Arizona State University

Arizona State University W. P. Carey School of Business
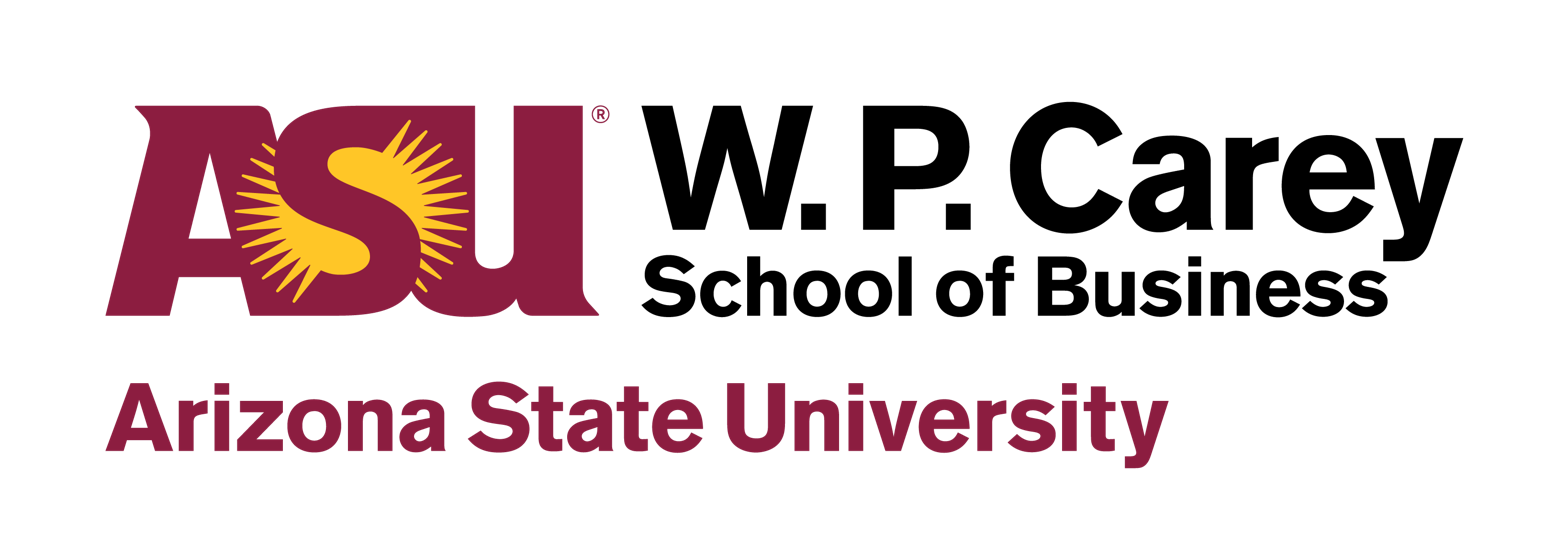
- Motto: "Where business is personal"
- Type: Public
- Established: 1961
- Dean: Ohad Kadan
- Location: Tempe, Arizona, U.S. 33.416°N 111.934°W
- Campus: 508 acres (ASU)
- Website: wpcarey.asu.edu

The W. P. Carey School of Business is the business school of Arizona State University. It claims to be the largest business school in the United States, reporting over 460 faculty and more than 23,000 students from 120 countries. Established in 1955, the school was renamed for William P. Carey following his $50 million gift in 2003.

== History ==
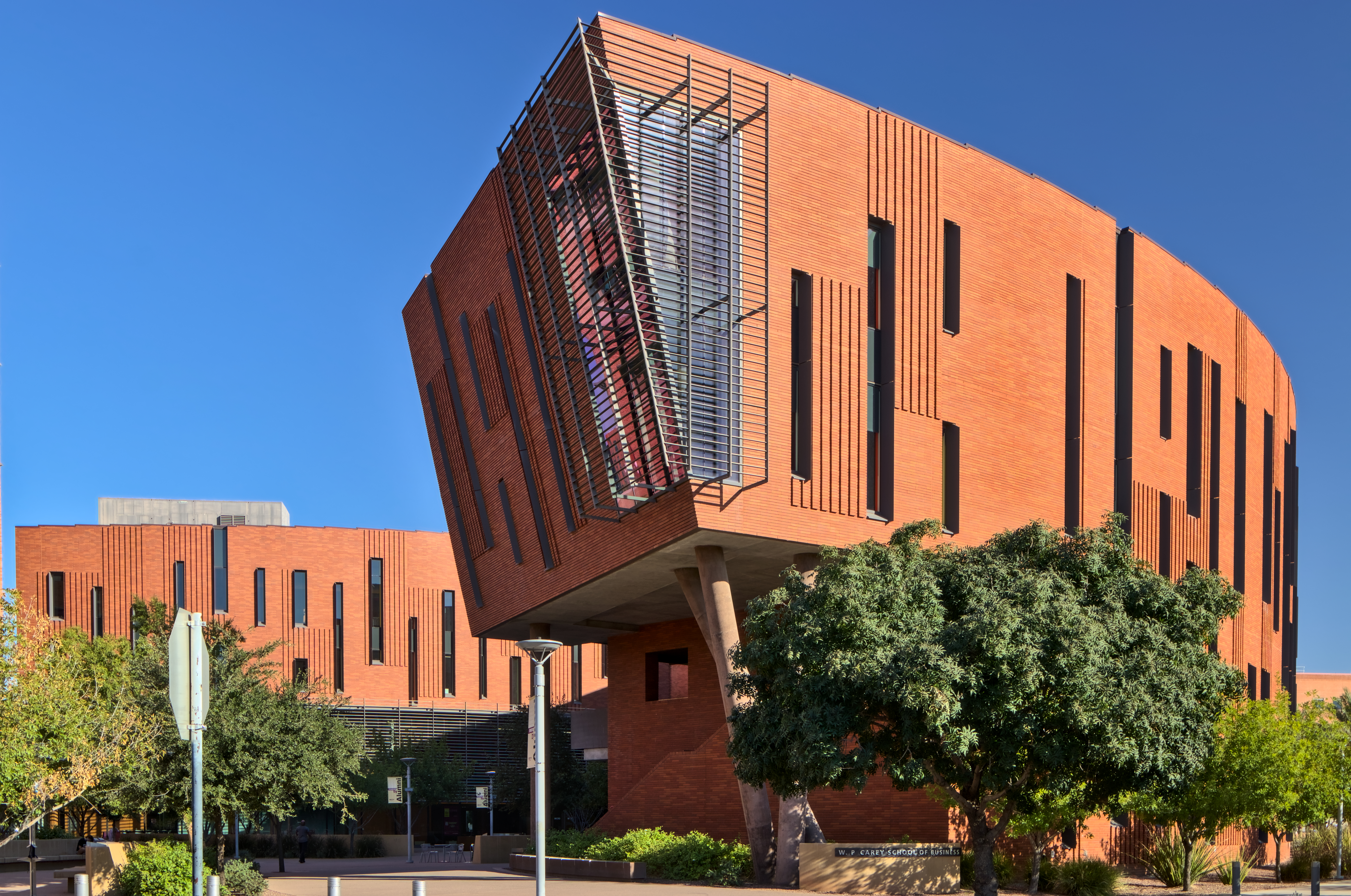
McCord Hall opened in 2013 as a home for the W. P. Carey School's MBA programs.

The school began as the Department of Commerce in 1916, offering business courses and curriculum to students interested in a business career. In 1955, the College of Business Administration was established with 800 students. As the department expanded, Emil John Hilkert was tapped to serve as dean for six months, although Glenn D. Overman is regarded as its founding dean, having established most of the college's programs.

In 1962, the school was accredited by the American Assembly of Collegiate Schools of Business (AACSB); by the early 2000s, it was one of the first AACSB-accredited business schools to offer fully online degrees. In 1968, it moved to a 90,000-square-foot (8,400 m^{2}) Business Administration building on the campus, which was enlarged with a 35,000-square-foot (3,300 m^{2}) addition in 1971. By the time a second, six-story building was completed in 1984, the College of Business Administration was the university's largest school.

The school was endowed in 2003 with a $50 million pledge from the W. P. Carey Foundation, which renamed the school the W. P. Carey School of Business. At the time, the $50 million pledge was the second-largest single donation to any U.S. business school. The W. P. Carey Foundation has since committed an additional $50 million to the school, with $25 million in 2019 for career services and endowed academic chairs and another $25 million in 2024 to expand real estate programs.

In 2013, the W. P. Carey School opened McCord Hall, a 129,000-square-foot (12,000 m^{2}) facility featuring more classrooms for graduate programs and undergraduate honors students, team rooms, a career center, and outdoor assembly areas. The facility was named for Arizona philanthropist Sharon Dupont McCord and her late husband Bob McCord.

Ohad Kadan was appointed dean in 2022.

In 2024, the school launched the first master's degree program in artificial intelligence from a U.S. business school with its Master of Science in Artificial Intelligence in Business.

== Programs ==
Business school rankings

U.S. MBA Rankings
- Bloomberg (2025): 39
- U.S. News & World Report (2026): 30

Global MBA Rankings
- FT (2026): 15

W. P. Carey offers two undergraduate degrees: a Bachelor of Science degree with option of 13 business majors and a Bachelor of Arts degree in Business with 23 major options. There are also 12 certificate options and two minors. The W. P. Carey undergraduate business program is ranked 24th in the nation overall by U.S. News & World Report. The online MBA is ranked No. 6, the Executive MBA 18th, and the Full-time MBA 30th. The W. P. Carey graduate programs office offers several different way for students to receive their Master's of Business Administration: Full-Time, Executive, Online, Part-time, and the new Fast-track program that allows students to receive an MBA in at little as nine months.

The W. P. Carey School of Business has nine academic units. It offers over 30 undergraduate business degree options on campus and online, including Bachelor of Arts and Bachelor of Science programs, as well as certificates and minors. It also offers more than 30 graduate degree options, including Master of Business Administration (MBA) programs, specialized master's degrees, and doctoral and executive education programs.

== Business research ==
The Financial Times Business Education Research Insights report ranks the school No. 15 nationally and No. 5 among public universities in the U.S. for business research based on reach, relevance, and impact.

The University of Texas at Dallas ranks the W. P. Carey School No. 20 in the U.S. for research productivity for the years 2020-2024, based on research contributions between all business journals. In joint TAMUGA Rankings conducted by Texas A&M University and the University of Georgia, the research productivity of the W. P. Carey Department of Management ranks No. 3 in the U.S. for the years 2020–2024.

The School of Business houses over 20 research centers and laboratories.

== Notable people ==
=== Faculty ===
- Robert Cialdini – regents emeritus professor of marketing
- Kevin J. Dooley – distinguished professor of supply chain management; Chief Scientist, The Sustainability Consortium
- Angelo Kinicki – Weatherup/Overby Chair in Leadership; professor of management
- Rajnish Mehra – E. N. Basha Arizona Heritage Chair in Economics; professor of economics and finance
- Edward C. Prescott – W. P. Carey Chair, Economics, and regents professor; 2004 Nobel Memorial Prize in Economic Sciences winner
- V. Kerry Smith – emeritus professor of economics

=== Alumni ===
- William P. Acker (MIM 1959) — major general, U.S. Air Force
- Michael J. Ahearn (BS Finance 1979) – CEO, First Solar
- John J. Batbie Jr. (BA Business Administration 1973) — major general, U.S. Air Force
- Leonard Berry (PhD Marketing 1968) — distinguished professor, Texas A&M University
- Elizabeth Bogus (BA Communication 2006) — soccer coach and player
- Doug Ducey (BS Finance 1986) – Governor of Arizona, 2015–2023
- Howard Falco (BS Business Management 1989) – author; speaker
- Vince Ferraro (MBA 1982) – VP of Global Strategy and Marketing, Eastman Kodak
- Mike Haynes (BS Finance 1982) – member, Pro Football Hall of Fame and College Football Hall of Fame; Vice President for Player Development, NFL
- Calvin C. Goode (BS Business Management 1949) — accountant, Phoenix Union High School District; councilman, Phoenix City Council
- John F. Goodman (BS Business 1970) — three-star general, U.S. Marine Corps
- Cory Hahn (BA Communication 2014) — front-office executive with the Arizona Diamondbacks
- Kim Komando (BS Computer Information Systems 1985) — radio and TV host
- Howard Lindzon (MBA 1991) — CEO, StockTwits; founder, Social Leverage
- Rex Maughan (BS Accountancy 1962) – founder, president and CEO, Forever Living Products
- Jeff Quinney (BS Finance 2001) – professional golfer
- David Spade (BS Business 1986) — comedian, actor
- Pat Tillman (BS Marketing 1997) – player, Arizona Cardinals; corporal, US Army Rangers
- Andrew Wantuck (BS Marketing 2001) — showrunner, GolfPass at Golf Channel; president, Gopher Productions
- Kevin Warren (MBA 1988) — president and CEO, Chicago Bears
- Danny White (BS Agribusiness 1995) — Dallas Cowboys quarterback, football coach

== See also ==
- List of United States business school rankings
- List of business schools in the United States

== Gallery ==
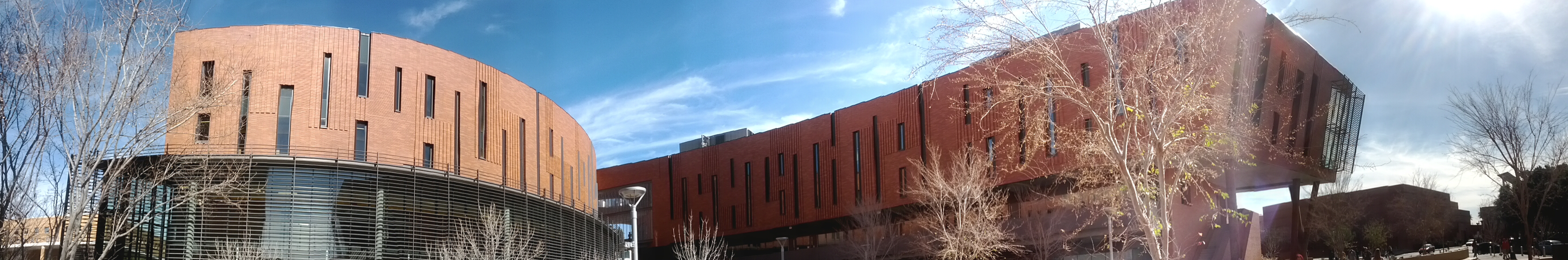
McCord Hall, W.P. Carey School of Business, ASU

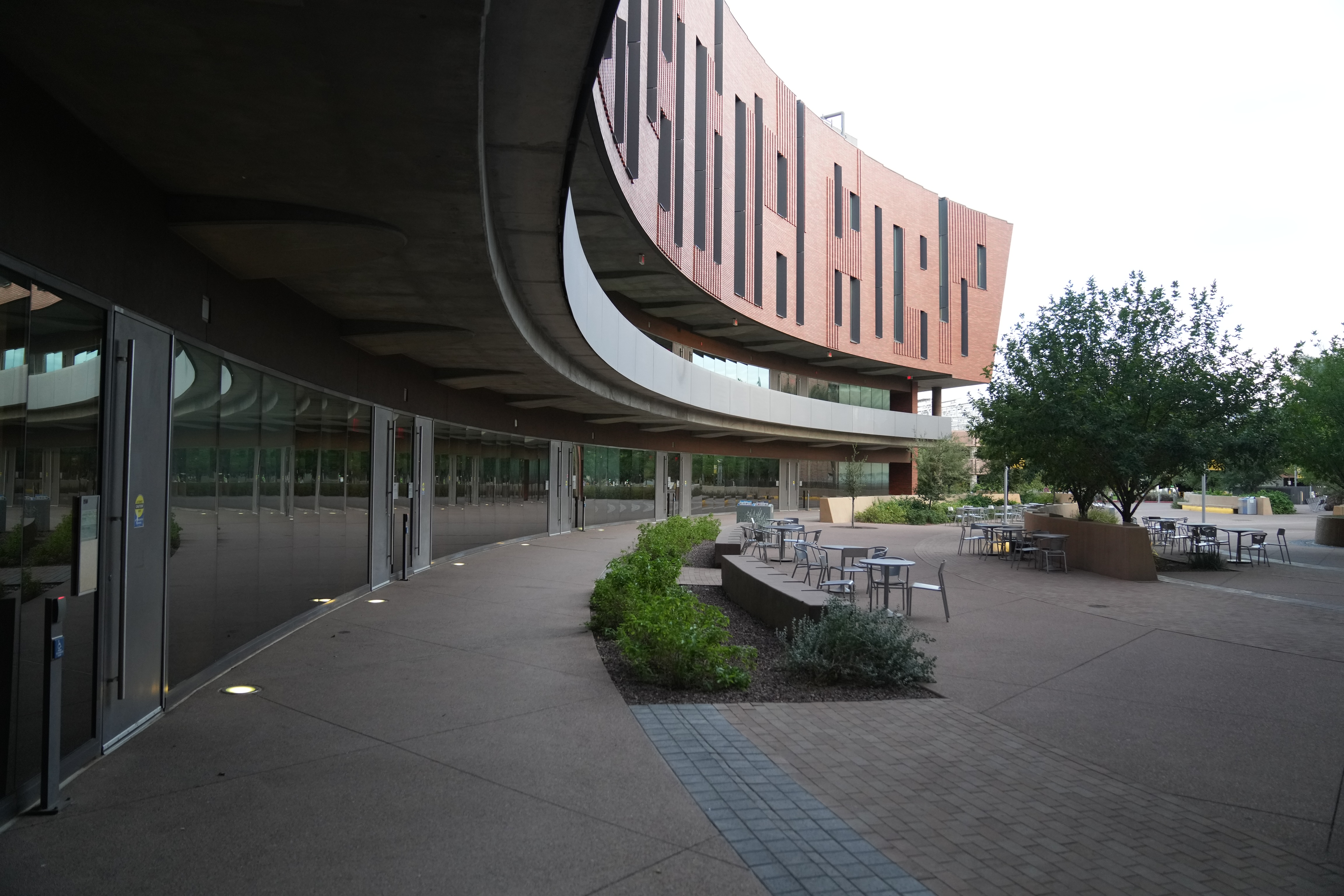
McCord Hall, W.P. Carey School of Business, ASU

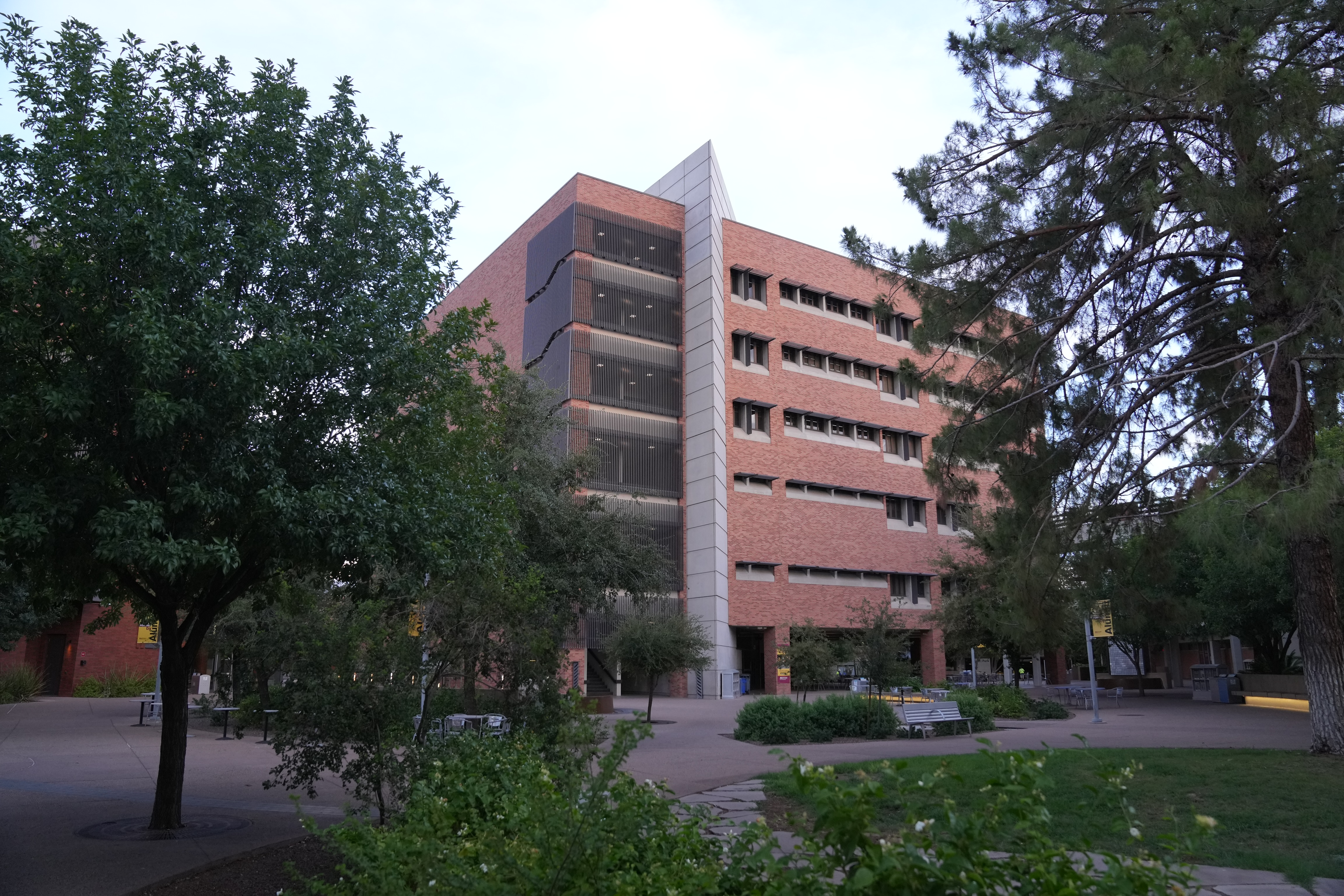
W.P. Carey School of Business, ASU

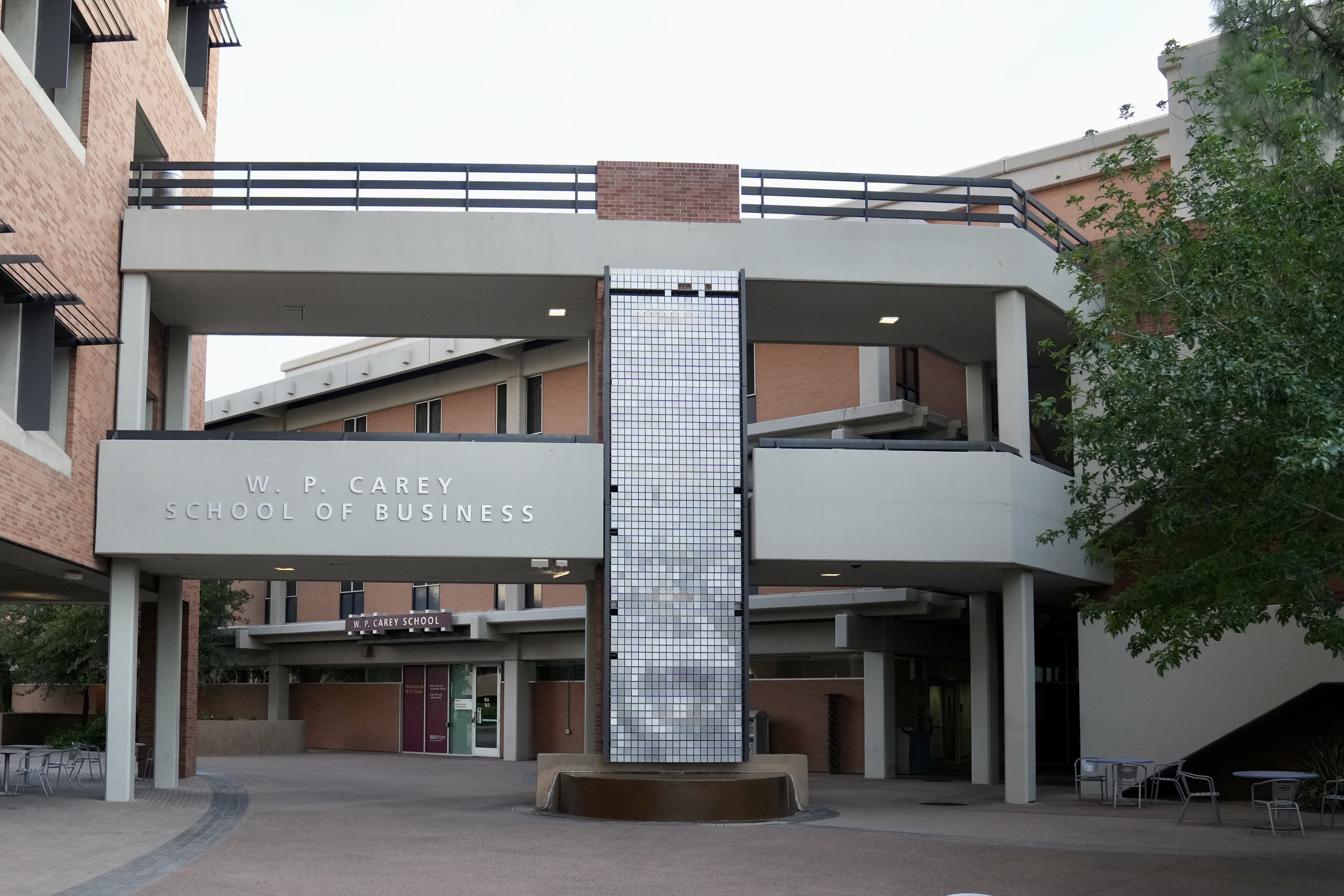
W.P. Carey School of Business, Arizona State University
