= Karen Gibson (choir conductor) =

Conductor

Karen Gibson Karen Gibson
- Born: Karen Muriel Cecile Gibson
- Occupation: choir conductor
- Instrument: voice

Karen Muriel Cecile Gibson MBE is a choir conductor and workshop leader with London's The Kingdom Choir, which she founded in 1993. She led the Kingdom Choir's gospel performance of "Stand by Me" at the wedding of Prince Harry and Meghan Markle in May 2018, after which she was described as "Britain’s godmother of gospel".

Gibson has previously provided backing vocals for acts such as Grace Kennedy and The Beautiful South. She has been involved with vocal groups and choirs since 1993, conducting gospel workshops all over the UK and Europe as well as Nigeria, Japan, Zimbabwe, Rwanda and the United States.

In 2020, Gibson appeared as a contestant on Series 15 of Celebrity Masterchef.

She was appointed Member of the Order of the British Empire (MBE) in the 2020 Birthday Honours for services to music.
