= One Britain One Nation =

Community interest company

- Founded: 2013
- Founder: Kash Singh
- Website: www.onebritainonenation.com

One Britain One Nation (OBON) is a community interest company founded in 2013. It was founded by Kash Singh, a former inspector with the West Yorkshire Police, who also founded the British Indian Association and won the West Yorkshire Police Oscar, and the Criminal Justice Award for his work in Manningham, Bradford, after the 2001 Bradford riots. He is said to be an associate of Esther McVey and Philip Davies.

Conservative MPs Andrea Jenkyns and Andrew Rosindell launched the "One Britain One Nation" all-party group in 2018, although it does not appear to have lasted beyond 2019.

The organisation launched a campaign to make the last Friday in June OBON day in schools in 2019. In June 2021 the Department for Education backed their campaign, urging "schools across the UK to celebrate One Britain One Nation Day on 25 June, when children can learn about our shared values of tolerance, kindness, pride and respect", and in particular for children to sing a patriotic song written by school children at St John's CE Primary School, Bradford titled "We are Britain and we have one dream / To unite all people in one great team". The song says the country is "united forever, never apart". Children were encouraged to dress in the colours of the British flag (red, white and blue). Gavin Williamson called the project "amazing" and said it was "incredibly important that schools take part". It was a failure. Headteachers said they did not take part because of Covid guidelines, logistical issues and because it “feels like propaganda”.

== Criticism ==
Scottish First Minister Nicola Sturgeon initially believed it "was a spoof", partly because the organisers did not appear to realise that many schools in Scotland ended for the summer before the chosen date. Daisy Cooper said this was "Boris Johnson's barmy brainwashing event".

Official sources denied schools were being encouraged to sing the anthem, as it would breach COVID-19 regulations on communal singing to do so.

The Football Association of Wales urged schools to film their pupils singing "Hen Wlad Fy Nhadau" on 25 June "with pride".
