= Line the Label =

Canadian clothing brand

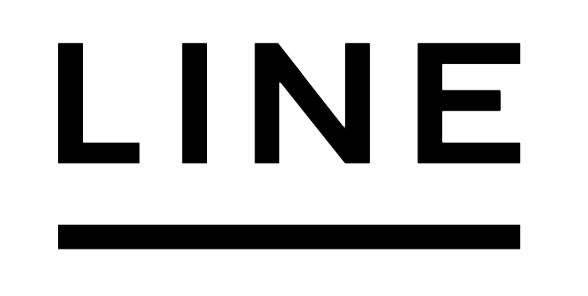
- Logo
- Product type: Fashion knits
- Current owner: John Muscat and Jennifer Wells
- Produced by: Line the Studio
- Country: Canada
- Introduced: 2000
- Website: www.linethelabel.com

Line the Label, also known as Line, is a Canadian fashion clothing brand, based in North York, Toronto. Production takes places in Toronto and China.

Line the Label claims to have a strong and loyal following from celebrities. Those who have reportedly worn the brand include Sarah Jessica Parker, Kate Bosworth, Sandra Bullock, Jennifer Garner, Kate Hudson, and Meghan Markle.

== History ==
The brand was co-founded by John Muscat and Jennifer Wells in 2000, and acquired by fashion importer PYA a few years later. Originally based in Toronto, the brand expanded to showrooms in Vancouver, Montreal and the US. The clothing is designed for women aged between 25 and 40, and described as "for the modern yet urban woman".

In 2014 the company's knitwear was available in over 600 shops, across boutiques and department stores, and eleven showrooms across four countries. In 2017 Muscat praised outsourcing production to China, stating it can produce quality products and the negative connotations from 20 years ago are no longer relevant.

Meghan Markle wore a trench coat designed by the company at the closing of the 2017 Invictus Games. The brand achieved international attention following the 2017 public announcement of her engagement to British Prince Harry, during which she wore a white jacket from the company. Muscat renamed the jacket "The Meghan" after the actress. The jacket, priced at £450, sold out online immediately; the increased traffic on the website crashed the server. Muscat subsequently released a statement saying it was one of Markle's favourite pieces designed by the company.

== See also ==
- Economy of Toronto
- List of companies of Canada
