= Ingrid Seward =

British royal biographer and magazine editor

Ingrid Seward is a British journalist, author and royal commentator. She is the editor-in-chief of Majesty, a monthly magazine covering the British and other royal families. She has written books about the British royal family.

== Career ==
Seward joined Majesty magazine in 1983. She later became its editor-in-chief.

Seward's journalism has included commentary on the relationship between then-Prince Charles and Diana, Princess of Wales. A 1991 article by Seward in The Observer examined differences in the couple's social interests and lifestyles before the public revelations about the breakdown in their marriage in the following year.

== Books ==
Examples of Seward's books include:

- The Queen's Speech. Simon and Schuster UK. 2016. ISBN 9781471151545., a study of Elizabeth II that examined her career through her public speeches.
- Prince Philip Revealed: A Man of His Century. Simon & Schuster UK. ISBN 978-1471183522., a biography of Prince Philip, Duke of Edinburgh.
- My Mother and I. Simon & Schuster UK. 2024. ISBN 978-1398515192., which examines the relationship between Elizabeth II and Charles.
- Catherine & Diana. Seven Dials. 2026. ISBN 978-1399636032., a book comparing the lives and public roles of Catherine, Princess of Wales, and Diana, Princess of Wales.
