= Countess Spencer =

Countess Spencer may refer to:

- Georgiana Spencer, Countess Spencer (1737–1814), wife of John Spencer, 1st Earl Spencer
- Charlotte Spencer, Countess Spencer (1835–1903), wife of British Liberal politician Viscount Althorp
- Cynthia Spencer, Countess Spencer (1897–1972), paternal grandmother of Diana, Princess of Wales
- Raine Spencer, Countess Spencer (1929–2016), stepmother of Lady Diana Frances Spencer
- Victoria Aitken (formerly Victoria, Countess Spencer; born 1965), sister-in-law of Diana, Princess of Wales
- Caroline Hutton (born 1966), sister-in-law of Diana, Princess of Wales
- Karen Spencer, Countess Spencer (born 1972), sister-in-law of Diana, Princess of Wales
