= Lady Kitty Spencer =

British fashion model and aristocrat (born 1990)

- Born: 28 December 1990 (age 35); St Mary's Hospital, London, England
- Education: Reddam House
- Alma mater: University of Cape Town; European Business School London
- Occupations: Model; aristocrat
- Spouse: Michael Lewis (m. 2021)
- Children: 1
- Parents: Charles Spencer, 9th Earl Spencer (father); Victoria Lockwood (mother)
- Relatives: Lady Eliza Spencer (sister); Lady Amelia Spencer (sister); Louis Spencer, Viscount Althorp (brother); Diana, Princess of Wales (aunt)
- Family: Spencer

Lady Kitty Eleanor Spencer Lewis (Note: Sources differ with regards to what her full name is, with some giving Katherine Eleanor Spencer or Katherine Eleanor Lewis, and the others Kitty Eleanor Spencer.) (née Spencer; born 28 December 1990) is a British model and aristocrat. She is the eldest child of Charles Spencer, 9th Earl Spencer. She is a niece of Diana, Princess of Wales, therefore first cousin of William, Prince of Wales and Prince Harry, Duke of Sussex. Spencer is the spokesmodel for jewellery brand Bulgari and fashion company Dolce & Gabbana.

== Early life and education ==
Lady Kitty Spencer was born on 28 December 1990 at St Mary's Hospital, London to Charles Spencer, Viscount Althorp (later the 9th Earl Spencer) and Victoria Lockwood. She is a member of the Spencer family, an English noble family that holds multiple peerages. Spencer has three younger siblings and four younger half-siblings through her father's second marriage to Caroline Freud and third marriage to Karen Gordon and her mother's second marriage to Jonathan Aitken. Her paternal aunt was Diana, Princess of Wales. She is a first cousin of William, Prince of Wales, and Prince Harry, Duke of Sussex.

She was raised in Cape Town, South Africa, where she attended Reddam House, a private school. After her parents divorced in 1997, Lady Kitty spent her time between her native United Kingdom with her father and South Africa with her mother.

In 2009, Spencer was presented as a debutante at the Hôtel de Crillon's le Bal des Débutantes in Paris. Kitty studied psychology, politics, and English literature at the University of Cape Town. She later studied art history and Italian in Florence, Italy, before completing a master's degree in luxury brand management from the European Business School London at Regent's University London.

== Career ==
In 1992, when Spencer was one year old, she appeared with her mother on the cover of Harper's Bazaar UK. She is signed with Storm Model Management, and made her professional modelling debut in 2015 in the December issue of Tatler. However, her first cover magazine was the 2009 April issue of Tatler magazine.

In September 2017 she walked for Dolce & Gabbana in a fashion show during Milan Fashion Week. She was the 2017 June covergirl of Hello Fashion Monthly, and was featured on the cover of Vogue Japan. She walked the runway for Dolce & Gabbana in their 2017 Christmas show at Harrods.

In 2018, Spencer was a featured model in Dolce & Gabbana's Venetian spring/summer print campaign. During 2018 Milan Fashion Week she walked in Dolce & Gabbana's Secrets & Diamonds fashion show. In May 2018 Bulgari announced that Spencer would be the new face of the jewellery brand, working as their newest brand ambassador. She had previously modelled for the jewellery designer, modelling the brand's Diva's Dream diamond necklace. On 23 September 2018, Lady Kitty walked in a fashion show in Milan for Dolce & Gabbana's Spring 2019 collection.

She also appeared in editorials for Marie Claire Spain and Elle Russia, and graced the covers of L'Officiel Brazil and Tatler, the latter alongside Helena Christensen. She was officially announced as a brand ambassador for Dolce & Gabbana in February 2021.

== Charity work ==
Spencer is an ambassador for Centrepoint, a charity that supports homeless young people. She specifically supports their independent living programme, that provides low-cost housing to support young people. Her aunt Diana, Princess of Wales, was formerly Centrepoint's patron. She is also a trustee and patron for the military charity Give Us Time. In June 2017 Spencer helped raise £140,000 for the Elton John AIDS Foundation. She also has raised funds for Save the Children.

== Personal life ==
Although Spencer is the 9th Earl Spencer's firstborn child, the title and family estates, Althorp and Spencer House, will pass to her younger brother, Viscount Althorp, due to male primogeniture, as specified for the remainder of the Earldom of Spencer. She expressed her personal belief in gender equality, while also stating that she believes her brother should inherit.

She attended the weddings of both her cousins, Prince William in April 2011 and Prince Harry in May 2018.

In January 2020, Spencer announced her engagement to Michael Lewis, the 61-year-old South African-British multimillionaire chairman of fashion company Foschini Group. They married in Frascati at the Villa Aldobrandini on 24 July 2021. Her wedding dress, a lace, long-sleeved Victorian-inspired gown, was designed by Dolce & Gabbana. The company designed five custom dresses in total for the celebrations, which took place over the course of three days.

Spencer has three adult stepchildren from her husband's previous marriage.

She and Lewis have a daughter named Athena together, born on 29 April 2023. Lady Kitty first shared images of her daughter in celebration of her second birthday, and kept the birth private until March 2024. As of 2025, she and her husband were residing in Marylebone, London.
