= Michael Lewis (businessman) =

British businessman (born 1959)

- Born: 1959 (age 66–67); South Africa
- Education: University of Cape Town
- Occupation: Businessman
- Title: Chairman, TFG Limited
- Spouses: Leola Lewis (m. 1985, divorced) Lady Kitty Spencer (m. 2021)
- Children: 4
- Relatives: Charles Spencer, 9th Earl Spencer (father-in-law); Victoria Aitken (mother-in-law); Louis Spencer, Viscount Althorp (brother-in-law)

Michael Lewis (born 1959) is a British businessman in the fashion industry. He is the owner of Australian and New Zealand bag and luggage retailer Strandbags and the chairman of South African clothing retailer group TFG Limited (formerly The Foschini Group).

== Early life ==
Lewis earned bachelor's and master's degrees from the University of Cape Town.

In the 1930s, his grandfather Meyer Lewis founded the Lewis furniture retail chain, and in the 1980s, his father Stanley Lewis acquired a controlling stake in Foschini Group (later renamed TFG Limited).

== Career ==
Lewis founded the biotechnology company ProChon Biotech. The company was acquired by Histogenics in 2011.

Lewis has been chairman of TFG Limited since 2015. He is the owner of Strandbags.

He is an independent director at Histogenics Corporation, a partner at Oceana Investment Partners LLP, chairman at Oceana Investment Corp Ltd, and chairman at Strandbags Holdings Pty Ltd. He is on the board of directors at Histogenics Corp, Oceana Capital Partners LLP, Oceana Fund Managers (Jersey) Ltd., United Trust Bank Ltd., and Oceana Concentrated Opportunities Fund Ltd.

== Personal life ==
Lewis moved to London in the 1980s. In 1985, he married Leola. They have three children, and are now divorced.

Lewis is Jewish, and in 2011, his family donated £3 million to the University of Oxford to fund the appointment of a Professor of Israel Studies.

In January 2020, his engagement to English fashion model, Lady Kitty Spencer, was announced. They married on 24 July 2021 at the Villa Aldobrandini in Frascati, near Rome. Lewis and Spencer have one daughter together, born in March 2024.
