= A Very Private School =

2024 memoir by Charles Spencer

- First edition
- Author: Charles Spencer, 9th Earl Spencer
- Language: English
- Publisher: William Collins
- Publication date: 12 March 2024
- Pages: 292
- ISBN: 978-0-008-66608-8

A Very Private School: A Memoir is a 2024 memoir by Charles Spencer, 9th Earl Spencer, about his childhood at Maidwell Hall School. It was published by William Collins, an imprint of HarperCollins, on 12 March 2024 in the United Kingdom.

== Background ==
In the book, Spencer recounted the trauma of being sent away from home at the age of eight, the beatings he received to the point of drawing blood, and punishments he witnessed, including the caning of the naked "buttocks [of young children] several times with a cane and carrying on". The book primarily discusses the period when the school was overseen by headmaster Alec "Jack" Porch (d. 2022), who retired in 1978 and whom Spencer describes as having an abusive leadership style.

During his research for the book, former pupils he interviewed disclosed that they had been raped repeatedly at the school, while some had lost siblings to self-neglect. One contemporary, when terminally ill, stipulated in his living will that he did not wish to see his parents, as he could not forgive them for sending him to the school. In an extract, Spencer details the sexual assaults and beatings he endured, stating that the school "sewed demons into the linings of the souls" of its victims. He also writes of having been sexually abused by a female staff member at Maidwell.

Spencer said that, after completing the book, he sought treatment at a "residential treatment centre" because the resurfacing trauma had caused a "breakdown". He argues that the brutalising effect of boarding schools on those who later hold positions of power has been damaging for society. Maidwell Hall reported itself to the local council following his allegations, and in June 2024, Northamptonshire Police announced that they had opened an investigation, with one person being arrested and released on conditional bail. The school closed at the end of the academic year in July 2025.

== Reception ==
The book received generally positive reviews. The Daily Telegraph gave it five stars, describing it as a "searing, heartbreaking book" and praising Spencer's willingness to confront the "shibboleths of his class and upbringing". Blake Morrison of The Guardian described the memoir as a "shocking and moving account of abuse", noting its "righteous anger" and "therapeutic honesty". The Financial Times described the memoir as a "heartbreaking account" of a boarding school "without love", while noting that Spencer's writing style was "sometimes a little grand". The i Paper called the memoir "brave and gruesome" and said it was "a stark account" of Spencer's time at Maidwell Hall.

Writing in The Washington Post, Kate Maltby described the book as an exposé of abuse at Maidwell Hall, calling it "a tour de force" as personal testimony, while suggesting that Spencer's broader analysis of the culture behind such institutions was "fairly basic". The Times described the book as "excruciatingly sad" and praised its "searing frankness".
