= Default (law) =

Failure to do something required by law (e.g. pay a debt or appear in legal proceedings)

In law, a default is the failure to do something required by law or to comply with a contractual obligation. Legal obligations can arise when a response or appearance is required in legal proceedings, after taking out a loan, or as agreed in a contract; failure to carry them out puts one in defaults of the obligations.

The concept of a "deliberate default" was considered in a UK legal case determined in 2010, De Beers UK Ltd. v Atos Origin It Services UK Ltd., where a contract had referred to this term. Edwards-Stuart J described "deliberate default" as meaning, in his view,

a default that is deliberate, in the sense that the person committing the relevant act knew that it was a default (i.e. in this case a breach of contract). I consider that it does not extend to recklessness and is therefore narrower than wilful misconduct (although the latter will embrace deliberate default).

Before the De Beers case there was little judicial guidance on the meaning of "deliberate default".

The same term ("deliberate defaulters") has been used by Her Majesty's Revenue and Customs (HMRC) in the UK to describe "people who deliberately get their tax affairs wrong".

== Default in legal proceedings ==
Failure to appear at a required time in legal proceedings can constitute a default.

In the United States, for example, when a party has failed to file meaningful response to pleadings within the time allowed, with the result that only one side of a controversy has been presented to the court, the party who has pleaded a claim for relief and received no response may request entry of default. In some jurisdictions the court may proceed to enter judgment immediately: others require that the plaintiff file a notice of intent to take the default judgment and serve it on the unresponsive party. If this notice is not opposed, or no adequate justification for the delay or lack of response is presented, then the plaintiff is entitled to judgment in his favor. Such a judgment is referred to as a "default judgment" and, unless otherwise ordered, has the same effect as a judgment entered in a contested case.

It is possible to vacate or remove the default judgment, depending on the particular state's law.

Entry of default in the United States district courts is governed by Rule 55 of the Federal Rules of Civil Procedure.

== Financial default ==
A common type of default is failure to meet the financial obligations of a loan. This can occur due to inability to pay, or voluntarily in a strategic default. When the debtor is a government, it is called a sovereign default.

A notice of default is a notification given to a borrower stating that a payment has not been made by the predetermined deadline, or is otherwise in default on the mortgage contract. Other ways a borrower may be in default include not providing proper insurance coverage for the property, or not paying due property taxes as agreed. It dictates that if the money owed (plus an additional legal fee), or other breach(es) are not paid/remedied in a given time, the lender may choose to foreclose the borrower's property. Any other people who may be affected by the foreclosure may also receive a copy of the notification.
