= Tomasz Starzewski =

British fashion and interior designer (born 1961)

- Born: 13 August 1961 (age 64); London, England
- Label: Tomasz Starzewski

Tomasz Starzewski (born 13 August 1961) is a British fashion and interior designer. The son of Polish parents who were given political asylum in 1947 in the UK, he came to attention when Diana, Princess of Wales, Baroness Thatcher, Queen Camilla, the Duchess of Edinburgh and the Duchess of York wore his designs.

He designed the wedding dress of Victoria Lockwood for her marriage to Charles Spencer, then Viscount Althorp, in September 1989.

The Tomasz Starzewski Gallery is located at 229 Ebury Street. The Belgravia gallery houses his fashion ready to wear and couture collections, signature furniture and guest artists.

He was interviewed by Sacha Baron Cohen on Da Ali G Show.
