= Strandbags =

Australian and New Zealand retailer

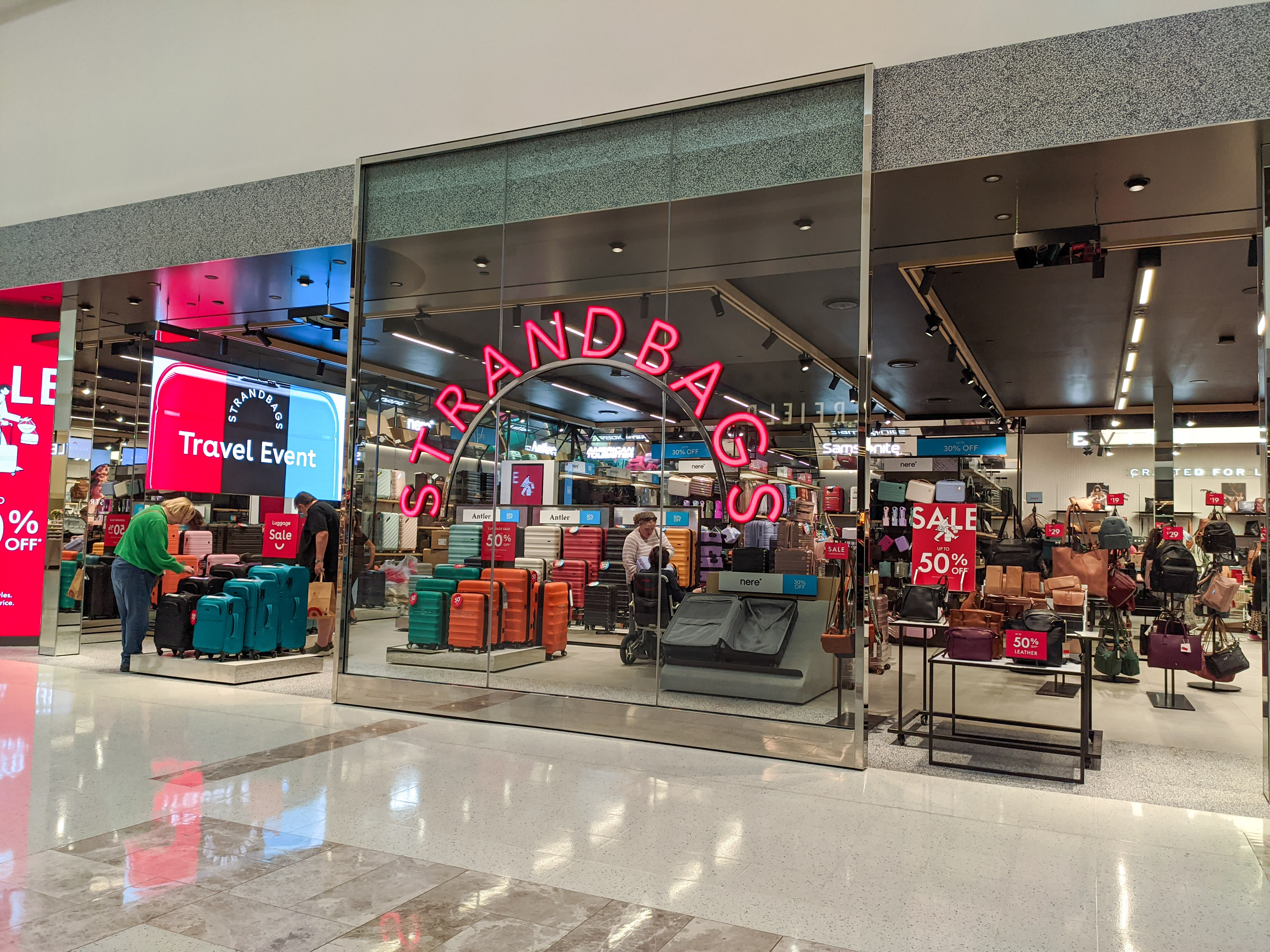
- Strandbags store in Westfield Carousel
- Industry: Retail
- Founded: 1927
- Headquarters: Pyrmont, New South Wales, Australia
- Number of locations: 260+ stores (2025)
- Area served: Australia; New Zealand
- Key people: Felicity McGahan (CEO)
- Products: Handbags, luggage, personal accessories
- Owner: Michael Lewis
- Number of employees: 2000+ (2025)
- Subsidiaries: Antler
- Website: strandbags.com.au strandbags.co.nz

Strand, or Strandbags Holdings, is an Australian and New Zealand retailer of handbags, wallets, luggage, backpacks and other personal accessories. The chain has over 234 stores around Australia. It also has 26 stores in New Zealand. It owns the British luggage brand Antler and the private label brands Evity and Nere.

== History ==
Strandbags was founded in 1927.

Felicity McGahan became CEO of Strandbags in 2018. In September 2019, the company opened a new larger concept flagship store at Melbourne's Chadstone Shopping Centre, as part of a strategy to expand the size of major stores. In October 2019, Strandbags invested in luggage startup July.

During the start of the COVID-19 pandemic in Australia and COVID-19 pandemic in New Zealand, stores closed for at least six weeks.

In August 2020, Scentre Group locked out some Strandbags stores over a rental dispute. The decision affected stores at Westfield centres in Australia. The dispute was resolved and the stores were allowed to reopen. Strandbags' revenue for the 2021 fiscal year was hit hard by the pandemic, only reaching $195.1 million compared to $350.8 million the previous year.

In July 2020, the British luggage brand Antler was acquired by Strandbags.

In May 2021, the New Zealand Commerce Commission laid charges against Strandbags under the Fair Trading Act 1986, accusing it of misleading consumers about discounts. The Commission accused the company of marketing discounts against a regular price that had never been used. The company was fined NZ$780,000 in November 2022.

In October 2021, Strandbags relaunched its website following a four-month redevelopment process. It followed the appointment of new Chief of Technology and Head of Online the previous year.

In May 2022, Strandbags launched Evity, a leather goods brand and, in July 2022, the company launched its Nere luggage brand in Australia and New Zealand. A UK launch followed in May 2023. The first stand-alone Nere retail store opened in Melbourne in November 2023.

In November 2022, Strandbags rebranded as Strand.
