= Amelia Spencer =

Amelia Spencer may refer to:

- Lady Amelia Spencer (born 1992) British model and socialite
- Amelia Spencer, character from British soap opera Emmerdale
