= Caroline Spencer, Countess Spencer =

English aristocrat and public relations specialist

Caroline, Countess Spencer
- Born: Caroline Victoria Hutton; 16 October 1966 (age 59)
- Education: University of Oxford
- Spouses: Matthew Freud (m. 1991; div. 2000); Charles Spencer, 9th Earl Spencer (m. 2001; div. 2007)
- Children: 4

Caroline "Pidge", Countess Spencer (née Caroline Victoria Hutton; born 16 October 1966), formerly Caroline Freud, is a British aristocrat and public relations specialist. She was married to Charles Spencer, 9th Earl Spencer, the younger brother of Diana, Princess of Wales, from 2001 to 2007.

== Early life ==
Hutton grew up in Sussex. Her father worked at Lloyd's of London before relocating the family to Roedean. She grew up with two brothers and three stepbrothers. Hutton went on to attend the University of Oxford.

== Career ==
Hutton worked as a nursery school teacher. After finishing her studies at Oxford, she worked in Monte Carlo as the public relations representative for a men's tennis tour. In 1988, she began working for Freud Communications.

As Countess Spencer during her second marriage, Hutton founded the Althorp Literary Festival. The annual event, hosted at the Spencer family's seat, Althorp, included Alain de Botton, Simon Schama, Tina Brown, Sebastian Faulks, Boris Johnson, and James Cracknell as speakers.

== Personal life ==
Hutton married public relations executive Matthew Freud, the son of former MP Sir Clement Freud and great-grandson of Sigmund Freud, for whom she worked for at Freud Communications in 1991. The couple divorced in 2000 and together they have two sons, George Rupert Freud and Jonah Henry Freud.

On 15 December 2001, she married Charles Spencer, 9th Earl Spencer. The Earl Spencer is the brother of the late Diana, Princess of Wales. Upon marriage, she became styled as The Right Honourable The Countess Spencer, and was addressed as Lady Spencer. As the earl's second wife, she became stepmother to his four children from his first marriage to Victoria Lockwood: Lady Kitty Spencer, Lady Amelia Spencer, Lady Eliza Spencer, and Louis Spencer, Viscount Althorp. She and Lord Spencer have two children: The Hon. Edmund "Ned" Spencer and Lady Lara Caroline Spencer. They separated in 2007 and later divorced.
