= Cat Jarman =

Norwegian archaeologist (born 1982)

The Right Honourable The Countess Spencer FSA
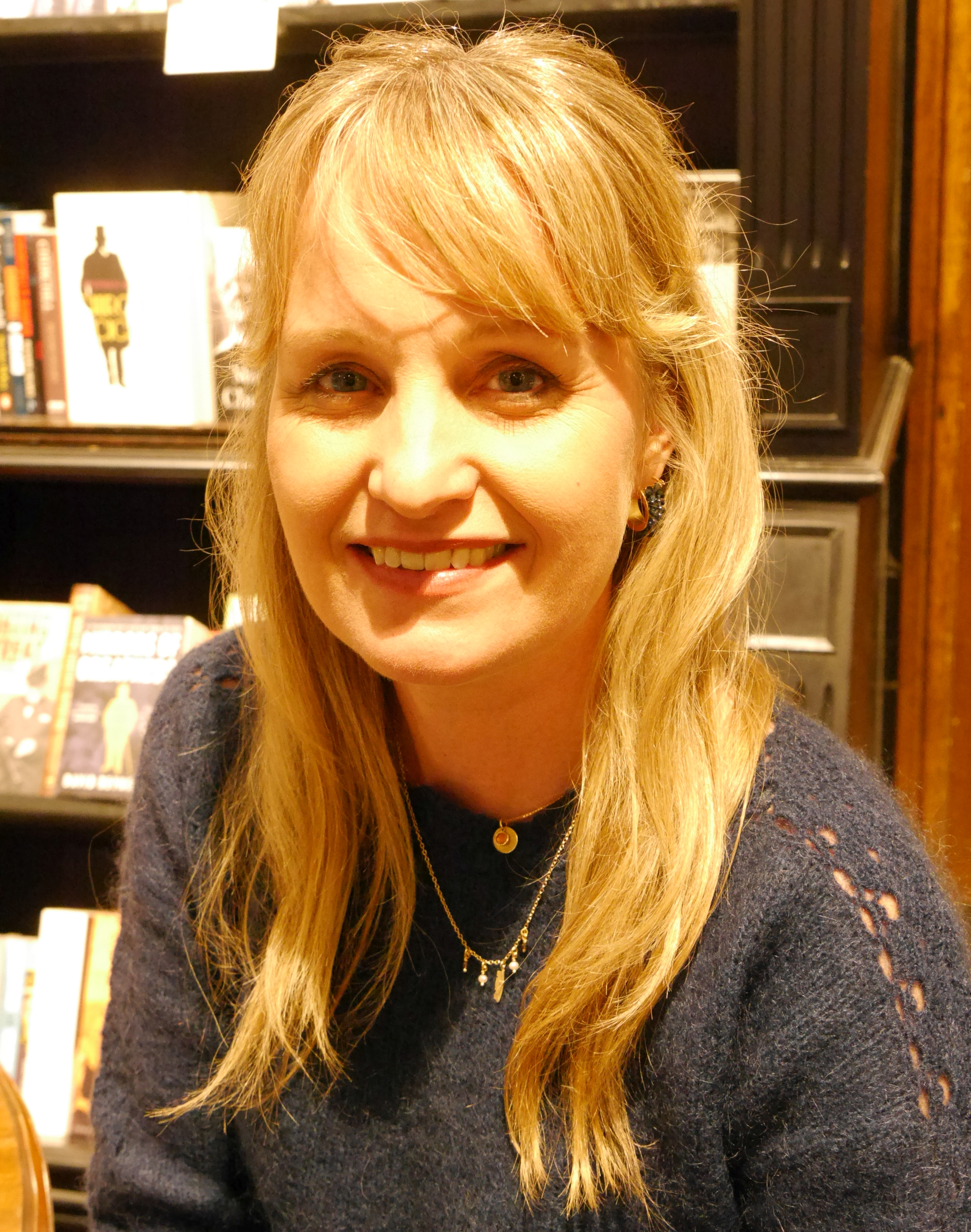
- Jarman at Hatchards in 2024
- Born: 1982 (age 43–44)
- Occupation: Archaeologist
- Spouses: Tom Jarman (divorced); Charles Spencer, 9th Earl Spencer (m. 2026)

Academic background
- Education: University of Oslo; University of Bristol
- Thesis: Resolving Repton: the nature of the Viking winter camp (2017)

Academic work
- Discipline: Archaeology
- Sub-discipline: Early medieval Europe; Viking Age; bioarchaeology; Isotope analysis in archaeology

Catrine Lie Spencer, Countess Spencer (formerly Jarman, née Lie; born 1982) is a Norwegian archaeologist and television presenter. She is the fourth wife of Charles Spencer, 9th Earl Spencer, the younger brother of Diana, Princess of Wales.

== Early life and education ==
Jarman was born Catrine Lie in Norway in 1982. She studied at the University of Oslo, graduating with a Master of Philosophy (MPhil) in 2012. Her master's thesis was titled "Identities home and abroad: An isotopic study of Viking Age Norway and the British Isles". She earned a PhD in archaeology from the University of Bristol in 2017. Her doctoral thesis was titled "Resolving Repton: the nature of the Viking winter camp", and her supervisor was Mark Horton.

== Career ==
After completing her PhD, she was an honorary senior research associate at the University of Bristol until 2020. She continued her work on Viking Repton; including isotopic analyses of the human remains, sequencing ancient DNA from samples, and "reassessing some of the unpublished artefacts".

Her 2021 book River Kings: A new history of the Vikings from Scandinavia to the Silk Roads was described as "an engaging introduction to the study of the Vikings" by the Times Literary Supplement. Her 2023 book The Bone Chests: Unlocking the Secrets of the Anglo-Saxons was called "an enthusiastic guide through England's early medieval past" by History Today.

In July 2024, she was awarded the Dan David Prize for "Archaeology of the Viking Age and public archaeology".

Her archaeological work was featured on eight episodes of BBC Two television series Digging for Britain. She is also a recurring presenter for the series.

Jarman presents the history podcast The Rabbit Hole Detectives with Richard Coles and Charles Spencer, 9th Earl Spencer. Together they wrote The Rabbit Hole Book, published by Michael Joseph in 2024.

== Personal life ==
Jarman was previously married, and has two children. She was diagnosed with multiple sclerosis in 2016.

Jarman's relationship with Charles Spencer, 9th Earl Spencer, was publicly confirmed in 2024 while he and his third wife, Karen Spencer, were filing for divorce. In October 2024, she brought a claim against Karen Spencer for alleged misuse of private information relating to her multiple sclerosis diagnosis. The claim was settled in December 2025 via a Part 36 provision, with Charles Spencer ordered to indemnify some of the costs as part of the Spencers' divorce arbitration.

On 15 May 2026, Jarman married Spencer in Sedona, Arizona, U.S. Following her marriage, she is styled The Right Honourable The Countess Spencer, and addressed Lady Spencer.

== Selected works ==
Articles

- Jarman, Catrine L.; Larsen, Thomas; Hunt, Terry; Lipo, Carl; Solsvik, Reidar; Wallsgrove, Natalie; Ka'apu-Lyons, Cassie; Close, Hilary G.; Popp, Brian N. (October 2017). "Diet of the prehistoric population of Rapa Nui (Easter Island, Chile) shows environmental adaptation and resilience". American Journal of Physical Anthropology. 164 (2): 343–361. Bibcode:2017AJPA..164..343J. doi:10.1002/ajpa.23273. PMC 5637906. PMID 28664976.
- Jarman, Catrine L.; Biddle, Martin; Higham, Tom; Bronk Ramsey, Christopher (February 2018). "The Viking Great Army in England: new dates from the Repton charnel". Antiquity. 92 (361): 183–199. doi:10.15184/aqy.2017.196.

Books

- River Kings: A new history of the Vikings from Scandinavia to the Silk Roads William Collins (2021) ISBN 978-0-00-835309-4
- The Bone Chests: Unlocking the secrets of the Anglo-Saxons William Collins (2023) ISBN 978-0-00-844732-8
- The Rabbit Hole Book with Richard Coles and Charles Spencer, Michael Joseph (2024) ISBN 978-0-241-68486-3
