= Lady Eliza Spencer =

British model

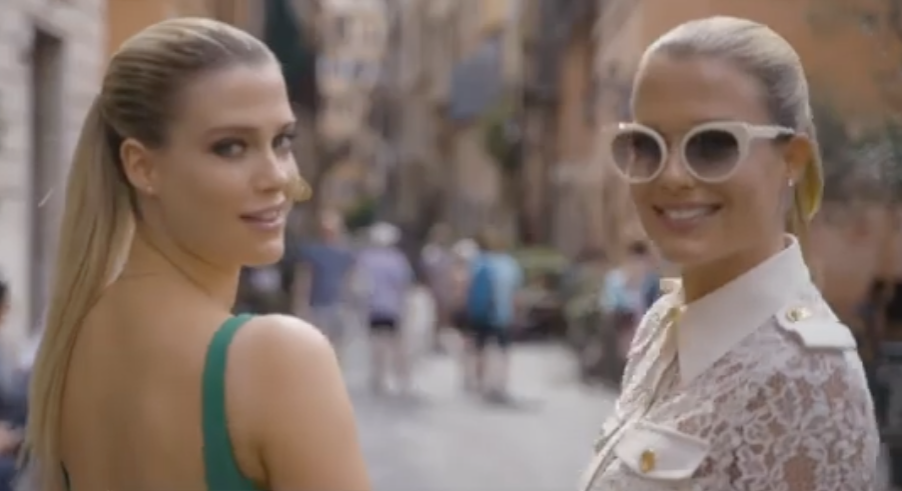
- Eliza (right) and Amelia Spencer in 2023
- Born: Eliza Victoria Spencer; 10 July 1992 (age 34); St Mary's Hospital, London, England
- Education: Varsity College
- Occupations: Model; socialite
- Parents: Charles Spencer, 9th Earl Spencer (father); Victoria Lockwood (mother)
- Relatives: Lady Amelia Spencer (twin sister); Lady Kitty Spencer (sister); Louis Spencer, Viscount Althorp (brother); Diana, Princess of Wales (aunt)
- Family: Spencer

Lady Eliza Victoria Spencer (born 10 July 1992) is a British model and socialite. She is a daughter of Charles Spencer, 9th Earl Spencer, niece of Diana, Princess of Wales and the first cousin of William, Prince of Wales and Prince Harry, Duke of Sussex.

== Early life ==
Born a minute before her identical twin sister, Lady Amelia Spencer, to parents Charles Spencer, 9th Earl Spencer, and Victoria Lockwood, Lady Eliza Victoria Spencer was born on 10 July 1992 at St Mary's Hospital, London. She is a member of the Spencer family, an English noble family that holds multiple peerages. Her paternal aunt was Diana, Princess of Wales and she is a first cousin of William, Prince of Wales, and Prince Harry, Duke of Sussex. Lady Eliza has an older sister, Lady Kitty Spencer, and two younger siblings―Lady Amelia Spencer, and Louis Spencer, Viscount Althorp ― and four younger half-siblings through her father's second marriage to Caroline Freud and third marriage to Karen Gordon and her mother's second marriage to Jonathan Aitken.

She was raised in Cape Town, South Africa, where her family moved in 1995. After her parents divorced in 1997, Lady Eliza spent her time between her native United Kingdom with her father and South Africa with her mother. She moved back to the United Kingdom in 2021. Spencer studied psychology and criminology at Varsity College.

== Career ==
In 2025, she became a brand ambassador for Aspinal of London and was featured in a 1960s-inspired campaign alongside her sister, Lady Amelia.

In October 2025, she attended the British Museum's first Pink Ball. She also attended the 2025 Fashion Trust Arabia Awards at the National Museum of Qatar in Doha and the 2025 British Fashion Awards.

== Personal life ==
On 31 July 2025, Spencer announced her engagement to the South African businessman Channing Millerd, who proposed to her while the couple were on holiday in Santorini.
