= Maidwell Hall =

Grade II listed building in Maidwell, West Northamptonshire, England

Coordinates: 52°23′04.7″N 0°54′00.5″W

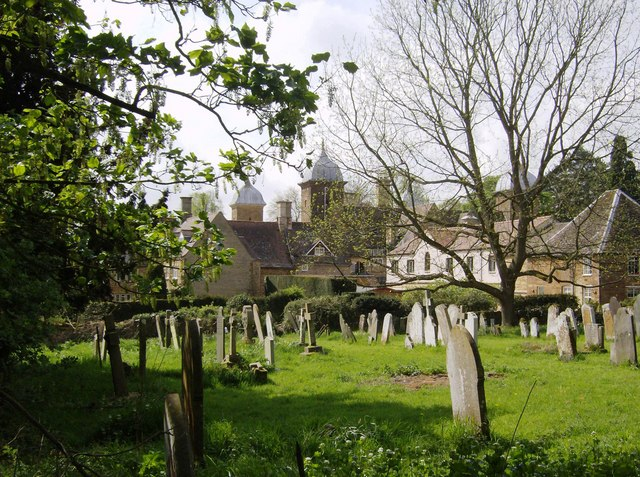
Maidwell Hall seen from the churchyard of St Mary the Virgin's Church, Maidwell

Maidwell Hall is a Grade II listed building in Maidwell, West Northamptonshire, England. The mostly 18th-century house was extensively damaged in a fire and remodelled in 1902. It was Maidwell Hall School until 2025, a coeducational preparatory school for boarding and day pupils aged 4–13 which since 2022 had been a part of the Uppingham Group, which is headed by Uppingham School. The school closed at the end of the 2024–25 academic year.

== House ==
Maidwell Hall dates to 1637. It was extensively remodelled in the 18th century and again in 1885 by John Alfred Gotch. A fire in 1895 largely destroyed the interior and is commemorated by stained-glass windows donated to St Mary's Church by the lord of the manor, Sir Reginald Loder. The interior was rebuilt in 1902. It was remodelled to house the school in about 1930 and extended in the 20th century. It became a Grade II listed building on 18 July 1985.

The house is on an H-plan, with square corner towers. It has two storeys and an attic with dormer windows; the central two-storey porch with balcony and the shaped gable behind it survive from the 17th-century house, as does one wing.

== School ==
Maidwell Hall School

Information
- Established: 1911
- Closed: 2025
- Gender: Boys (1911–2010); Mixed (2010–2025)

Maidwell Hall School was founded as a boys' preparatory school in 1911. It moved to Maidwell Hall in 1933 and became co-educational in 2010.

Oliver E. P. Wyatt (1898–1973), the long-time headmaster, served as chair of the Incorporated Association of Preparatory Schools in 1944 and 1948, contributed evidence to the Fleming Report on public school and general education prepared by David Fleming in 1944, and co-authored a book on preparatory schools published in 1951. He was also a prominent horticulturalist. In 1963 he was succeeded as headmaster by John Porch (d. 2022), who retired in 1978. Porch was notably mentioned in Charles Spencer's memoir A Very Private School (2024) for his abusive leadership style. Anthony Rendall was headmaster from 2022 to 2025, when the school closed.

Memoirs published in the 21st century by two former boarders have described harsh corporal punishment at the school: by Andrew Motion in 2006, about the Wyatt era and by Charles Spencer, 9th Earl Spencer in 2024, about the Porch era. Spencer also wrote of having been sexually abused by a female staff member at Maidwell. In response to Spencer's book, the school issued a statement of apology for "practices which were, sadly, sometimes believed to be normal and acceptable at that time" and noting that wideranging changes made to life at the school had as their primary purpose "the safeguarding of children and promotion of their welfare." The spokesman also said that the school had reported the allegations to the local authority for investigation. Northamptonshire Police announced in June 2024 that they had begun an investigation, with one person being arrested and released on conditional bail.

In 2022, the school merged with Uppingham School in Rutland. In January 2025, Uppingham School announced that Maidwell Hall would close at the end of the academic year after operating at a financial loss for many years, majorly due to falling numbers of boarding students which are significantly more profitable than their day student counterparts, as well as to a lesser extent the October 2024 budget's inclusion of VAT on private school fees and the discontinuation of business rates relief. However information obtained from Companies House indicate significant financial decline since the early 2010s. Similarly, in 2021, reported Cash in Hand and at Bank values of £1543 with fiscal liabilities falling due in the next financial year exceeding £500,000, further indicate a dire financial state, even before being merged with Uppingham School and the 2024 budget.

A parent group has lodged a complaint with the Charity Commission against the Uppingham School Group; alleged failings including financial mismanagement, governance breaches, charity law violations and the false solicitation of fees.

In 2026 it was reported that the school had been bought by Overstone Park school for conversion into a second campus.

=== Notable students ===
- Sir Adam Butler
- Matthew Fort
- Andrew Motion
- William Sitwell
- Charles Spencer, 9th Earl Spencer
- James Taylor, cricketer
