= Calderbank v Calderbank =

English legal case concerning offers of settlement

- Court: English Court of Appeal
- Full case name: Jacqueline Anne Calderbank v John Thomas Calderbank
- Decided: 5 June 1975
- Citation: [1976] Fam 93; [1975] 3 All ER 333
- Transcript: judgment

Court membership
- Judges sitting: Cairns, Scarman and Willmer LJJ

Keywords
- Calderbank offer, settlement offer

Calderbank v Calderbank [1976] Fam 93, [1975] 3 All ER 333 (EWCA); was an English Court of Appeal decision establishing the concept of a "without prejudice, save as to costs" offer. In Australia, such offers are called "Calderbank Offers", after the case. In England and Wales, a codified equivalent of a "without prejudice save as to costs" offer is a "Part 36 Offer", after the part of the Civil Procedure Rules under which the procedure is codified.

== Facts ==
After a marriage of 17 years, Mr and Mrs Calderbank separated and filed for divorce, which was duly granted.

However substantial difficulties arose regarding the division of the matrimonial assets of £78,000, resulting from the £80,000 Mrs Calderbank had previously inherited during the relationship from the estates from the death of both her parents. Complicating matters further, the matrimonial home was registered under only Mr Calderbank's name (for fiscal reasons), and he continued to live in this property after the divorce.

The matter was referred to the Family Court, and the judge awarded Mr Calderbank the modest amount of £10,000 (out of the total assets of £78,000), as well as court costs.

However prior to the matter going to trial, Mrs Calderbank had made the following offer via no less than the form of an affidavit, "I am willing, and have always been willing, to make over to the [husband] the house at Alderley Edge", which Mr Calderbank declined.

While this house was not the matrimonial home (it was rented by Mr Calderbank's father, and Mr Calderbank's mother lived there), the trial judge was of the opinion that this house was worth about £12,000, which was £2,000 more than Mr Calderbank later obtained at trial.

Mrs Calderbank, not happy with the outcome, appealed on two grounds, that the courts had no legal jurisdiction to make such a property division and, of most legal significance, that as Mr Calderbank had obviously declined a reasonable pre trial settlement offer, he should not be entitled to legal costs for unnecessarily prolonging the legal proceedings.

== Judgment ==
The Court decided that if a winning party in litigation refuses an earlier settlement offer made by the losing party, the losing party may produce the settlement offer as evidence towards the appropriate level of costs payable. In practice, if the winning party's award of damages is less than the earlier settlement offer, the losing party may have to pay fewer costs to the winning party than normal.

On the facts, the Court upheld the lower court's quantum of the £10,000. However, the Court reversed the burden of paying legal costs from Mrs Calderbank onto Mr Calderbank (although Mrs Calderbank remained liable for costs up to "14 days after 14 August", the affidavit having been sworn on 10 August). The Court held that the legal proceedings had been unnecessarily prolonged by Mr Calderbank's earlier refusal to accept Mrs Calderbank's settlement offer of around £12,000.

== See also ==
- Settlement offer
- Costs in English law
