= Charles Spencer, 9th Earl Spencer =

British peer (born 1964)

The Right Honourable The Earl Spencer DL
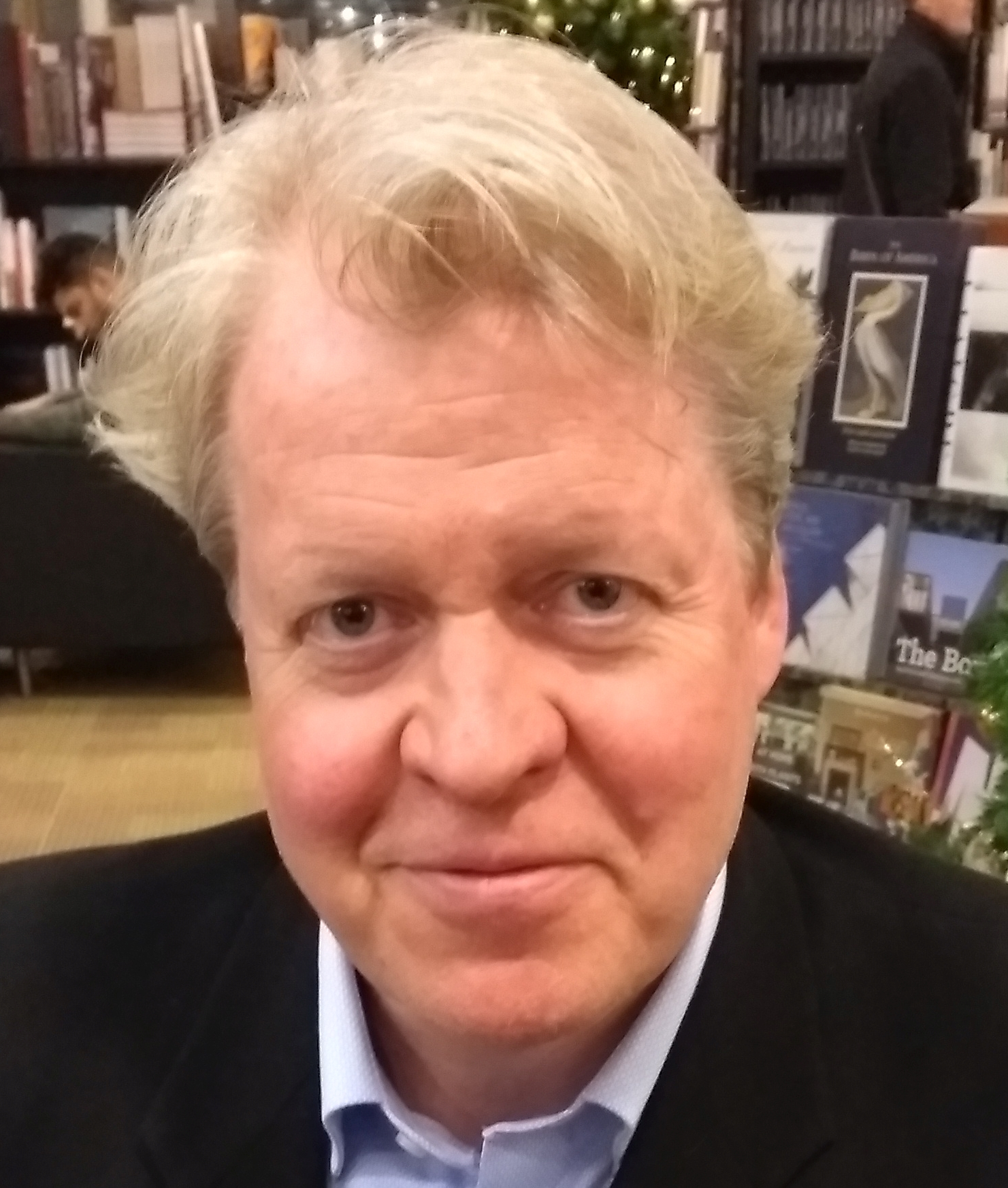
- Spencer in 2017

Member of the House of Lords
- Lord Temporal
- In office 29 March 1992 – 11 November 1999 as a hereditary peer
- Preceded by: John Spencer, 8th Earl Spencer
- Succeeded by: Seat abolished (Note: Pursuant to the House of Lords Act 1999.)

Personal details
- Born: Charles Edward Maurice Spencer; 20 May 1964 (age 62) Marylebone, London, England
- Spouses: Victoria Lockwood (m. 1989; div. 1997) Caroline Freud (m. 2001; div. 2007) Karen Gordon (m. 2011; div. 2025) Cat Jarman (m. 2026)
- Children: 7, including Lady Kitty, Lady Amelia, Lady Eliza, and Louis, Viscount Althorp
- Parent(s): John Spencer, 8th Earl Spencer; Frances Shand Kydd
- Relatives: Diana, Princess of Wales (sister); Lady Sarah McCorquodale (sister); Lady Jane Fellowes (sister)
- Education: Magdalen College, Oxford

Charles Edward Maurice Spencer, 9th Earl Spencer (born 20 May 1964), styled Viscount Althorp between 1975 and 1992, is a British peer, historian, author, journalist and broadcaster. He is the younger brother of Diana, Princess of Wales, and the maternal uncle of William, Prince of Wales, and Prince Harry, Duke of Sussex.

== Early life and education ==
Charles Edward Maurice Spencer was born on 20 May 1964 in Marylebone, London, the youngest of five children of John Spencer, 8th Earl Spencer, and Frances Roche (later Shand Kydd), daughter of Maurice Roche, 4th Baron Fermoy. His parents married in 1954 at Westminster Abbey, with the royal family in attendance. Spencer grew up with three elder sisters, Sarah, Jane and Diana. An elder brother, John, had been born four years before him, but died 10 hours after birth, leaving Charles as the eventual heir to the earldom. Within the family, he was also known informally as "Carlos" and "Buzz". He lived at Park House, Sandringham Estate, until the death of his paternal grandfather, after which the family moved to Althorp House, the Spencers' estate.

Both sides of Spencer's family had long‑standing connections to the royal household, and he was baptised at Westminster Abbey, with Queen Elizabeth II serving as one of his godmothers. His father was an equerry to King George VI and Queen Elizabeth ll, and both his grandmothers, Lady Cynthia Spencer and Ruth Roche, Baroness Fermoy, were ladies-in-waiting to Queen Elizabeth the Queen Mother. His brother-in-law, Robert Fellowes, was the private secretary of Queen Elizabeth ll from 1986 to 1999.

Spencer was three years old when his parents' troubled marriage ended in divorce following his mother's affair with Peter Shand Kydd. In 1975, Spencer became styled Viscount Althorp when his father succeeded as Earl Spencer on the death of his paternal grandfather. He began his formal education at Silfield Private School in King's Lynn, Norfolk, and from the age of eight attended the boys' private boarding school Maidwell Hall in Northamptonshire. He was later educated at Eton College and completed a degree in Modern History at Magdalen College, Oxford University.

In his memoir A Very Private School, published in March 2024, Spencer described the violent beatings, sexual abuse, "culture of cruelty", "hopelessness and abandonment", and the absence of affection he experienced at Maidwell Hall, one of England's most prestigious boarding schools.

== Career ==
Spencer worked as an on-air correspondent with NBC News from 1986 to 1995, primarily for the network's morning programme, Today and NBC Nightly News. He wrote and presented the 12-part documentary series Great Houses of the World (1994–1995) for NBC Super Channel. He also worked as a reporter for Granada Television from 1991 to 1993.

Spencer has written several book reviews for The Guardian and The Independent on Sunday, as well as feature stories for The Guardian, The Daily Telegraph, The Sunday Telegraph and American publications such as Vanity Fair, Verandah and Nest.

Upon his father's death on 29 March 1992, Spencer succeeded as 9th Earl Spencer. He also inherited Althorp House, the family's ancestral seat in Northamptonshire. Since 2009, he has restored Althorp, re-roofing it and restoring its entire exterior for the first time since the 1780s. He has also helped establish Althorp Living History, a handmade fine-furniture line reproducing pieces from the collection at Althorp. The Spencer family's wealth derived from their profitable sheep farming in the Tudor era.

Spencer was a member of the House of Lords from 29 March 1992, the day his father died and he inherited the peerage, until the House of Lords Act 1999 excluded most hereditary peers on 11 November 1999.

On several occasions, Spencer has been accused of refusing to allow his sister Diana to live in a cottage on the Althorp estate, despite her request at the height of her emotional difficulties. The claim has however been disputed, by accounts that state Spencer offered Diana alternative properties. In 2021, The Times issued an apology acknowledging that "having considered his sister's safety, and in line with police advice, Spencer offered the Princess of Wales a number of properties included Wormleighton Manor (in Warwickshire), the Spencer family's original ancestral home". In the correspondence which came to light during the 2002 trial of Diana's former butler Paul Burrell, Spencer told the princess that their relationship was the weakest he had with any of his sisters. He called her a "fickle friend" who was deceitful and manipulative. He wrote: "I know how manipulation and deceit are parts of the illness... I pray that you are getting appropriate and sympathetic treatment for your mental problems".

On 31 August 1997, Diana died after a car crash in Paris and Spencer delivered the eulogy at her funeral service held at Westminster Abbey six days later. In his eulogy, he rebuked both Britain's royal family and the press for their treatment of his sister. Spencer ruled out conspiracy theories concerning his sister's death and called the alleged letter she wrote 10 months before her death, in which she discussed her fears of a planned accident, "just a bizarre coincidence rather than tied in with reality." Spencer received an apology from Tim Davie, the BBC's director general, in late 2020 for the unethical practices used by BBC staff to gain his sister's consent to, “An Interview with HRH The Princess of Wales" in November 1995 for the corporation's Panorama television programme. Former BBC chairman Michael Grade said a full inquiry should be conducted, which Davie has said would happen. Spencer said that he would not have introduced Martin Bashir to his sister without the falsified documents that Bashir used to make false and defamatory claims about senior members of the royal family.

Diana was buried on an island in a lake on Spencer's ancestral estate, Althorp, where he built a garden temple memorial and a museum to her memory, displaying her wedding dress and other personal items. The museum was opened to the public in 1998, with all profits going to the Diana, Princess of Wales Memorial Fund; the museum has since closed. At this stage, Spencer began writing a series of books dealing with the estate itself and with his family history, beginning with an account of his ancestral home, Althorp: the Story of an English House, published in 1998.

In 2003, Spencer founded the Althorp Literary Festival. Speakers at the annual event have included the authors Bill Bryson, Helen Fielding, Antonia Fraser and Boris Johnson. In 2004, he presented two documentaries for the History Channel on Blenheim: Battle for Europe.

Spencer was appointed a Deputy Lieutenant of Northamptonshire in November 2005; the Spencer family have had a long association with the county, the home of the family seat. Spencer is also a patron of the Northamptonshire County Cricket Club. In 2021, Spencer authored an audiovisual walking tour for St. James's Park about the execution of Charles I, entitled Death of a King: The Path to Execution, on the BARDEUM mobile app.

In 2023, he began presenting the podcast The Rabbit Hole Detectives with Richard Coles and Cat Jarman, in which each of them is given an obscure topic and they then discuss their findings. In May 2025, Spencer joined the panel of ITV's Loose Men, a male version of the channel's Loose Women programme.

Spencer's memoir of Diana, Swan Song, was published on 22 September 2026. In extracts released ahead of publication, Spencer alleged that the then Prince Charles (later King Charles III) said "we'll forget her soon enough" in a phone call with him after her death, describing his tone as "giddily elated" and as if he were a "lottery winner". The allegations prompted Buckingham Palace to issue a statement, saying that the King "is mindful that the pain of fraternal grief can cloud reason, affect judgment and colour memory in ways others do not recognise, even many years after such a loss." Journalist Piers Morgan said he would sue Spencer, disputing allegations in the memoir and denying Spencer's allegation that he was responsible for publishing photographs of Diana taken in a gym. He noted that the images appeared in the Sunday Mirror in 1993, "nearly two years before I became editor of the Daily Mirror", and described the memoir as containing "fabricated inaccuracies". In a statement, Spencer acknowledged the error and apologised to Morgan.

== Personal life ==
On 16 September 1989, Spencer, then known by the courtesy title of Viscount Althorp, married Victoria Lockwood. They have four children: Kitty (born 1990), Eliza and Amelia (born 1992, twins), and Louis (born 1994). It was reported that Spencer had an extra-marital affair with a journalist early in the marriage. In the spring of 1994, after the birth of their last child, he met a married South African socialite with whom he began an affair that lasted two years and five months, ending in December 1996. Spencer and Lockwood were divorced on 3 December 1997, with Diana's death occurring while the case was in progress. After the divorce, Spencer returned from Cape Town, South Africa, where he and Lockwood had relocated their family in 1995 to avoid media attention. Spencer did not attend the weddings of his daughters Kitty and Amelia in 2021 and 2023, respectively, amid reports that his relationship with his elder children had "cooled".

On 15 December 2001, Spencer married Caroline Freud (née Hutton), former wife of businessman Matthew Freud. They have two children: Edmund (born 2003) and Lara (born 2006). They separated in 2007 and later divorced. Mr Justice Munby was the presiding judge. Spencer's barrister Nicholas Mostyn advised his client that the case could be heard in private, which Munby rejected. Spencer was upset at the final settlement and unsuccessfully sued Mostyn.

On 18 June 2011 at Althorp, Spencer married Karen Gordon (née Villeneuve), a Canadian philanthropist, the founder and chief executive of Whole Child International, a charity based in Los Angeles. They have a daughter: Charlotte (born 2012). In June 2024, it was announced that Spencer and Gordon had separated in April 2024 and planned to divorce. Spencer was represented by Baroness Shackleton, who represented the then-Prince of Wales in his divorce from Spencer's sister Diana. Their divorce was finalised in December 2025.

It was reported in 2024 that Spencer was in a relationship with archaeologist Cat Jarman, with whom he was co-hosting the podcast The Rabbit Hole Detectives. The two met in 2021 when Spencer was asked to review Jarman's book River Kings, the same year they worked together on an archaeological project at the Spencer family estate. Spencer has noted that their differing backgrounds, particularly Jarman's lack of connection to British social circles, has contributed positively to the relationship. In October 2024, Jarman brought a claim against Gordon for alleged misuse of private information relating to her MS diagnosis. The claim was settled in December 2025 via a Part 36 provision, with Spencer ordered to indemnify some of the costs as part of the Spencers' divorce arbitration. On 15 May 2026, Spencer married Jarman in Sedona, Arizona, United States.

Spencer has stated that he suffers from rejection sensitive dysphoria. He has also spoken openly about his struggles with alcohol and marked six months without alcohol in October 2025.

== Bibliography ==
=== Books ===
- Althorp: The Story of an English House (1998). London: Viking ISBN 978-0-312-20833-2.
- The Spencer Family (1999). London: Viking. US edition: The Spencers: a Personal History of an English Family (2000) ISBN 978-0-670-88323-3 & ISBN 978-0-312-26649-3.
- Blenheim: Battle for Europe (2004). London: Weidenfeld & Nicolson; paperback edition by Phoenix, 2005. ISBN 0-304-36704-4. This book was a Sunday Times best-seller.
- Prince Rupert: The Last Cavalier (2007). London: Weidenfeld & Nicolson ISBN 978-0-297-84610-9.
- Killers of the King: The Men Who Dared to Execute Charles I (2014). London: Bloomsbury ISBN 978-1-408-85170-8. This book was a Sunday Times best-seller.
- Impressions of Althorp: Thoughts on My Spencer Heritage (2015). Spencer 1508 Ltd ISBN 978-0-957-27150-0.
- To Catch A King: Charles II's Great Escape (2017). London: William Collins ISBN 978-0-008-15366-3
- The White Ship: Conquest, Anarchy and the Wrecking of Henry I's Dream (2020). London: William Collins ISBN 978-0-008-29682-7
- A Very Private School: A Memoir (2024). London: William Collins ISBN 978-0-008-66608-8
- The Rabbit Hole Book (2024). With: Richard Coles & Cat Jarman. London: Michael Joseph ISBN 978-0-241-68486-3
- Swan Song: Diana, My Sister (2026). Michael Joseph ISBN 978-0-241-82559-4

=== Articles ===
- Spencer, Charles (14 December 2009). "Enemies of the Estate". Vanity Fair.

== Coat of arms ==
Coat of arms of Charles Spencer, 9th Earl Spencer
Coronet A Coronet of an Earl Crest Out of a Ducal Coronet Or a Griffin's Head Azure gorged with a Bar Gemelle Gules between two Wings expanded of the second Escutcheon Quarterly Argent and Gules in the 2nd and 3rd quarters a Fret Or over all on a Bend Sable three Escallops of the first Supporters Dexter: A Griffin per fess Ermine and Erminois gorged with a Collar Sable the edges flory-counterflory and chained of the last and on the Collar three Escallops Argent; Sinister: A Wyvern Erect on his tail Ermine similarly collared and chained Motto Dieu défend le droit (God defend the right)

== Notes ==
Court offices
Preceded by Edward Gordon-Lennox	Page of Honour; 1977–1979	Succeeded by Tyrone Plunket
Peerage of Great Britain
Preceded by Edward Spencer	Earl Spencer; 29 March 1992 – present	Incumbent; Heir: Louis Spencer, Viscount Althorp
Orders of precedence in the United Kingdom
Preceded by The Rt. Hon. The Earl of Radnor	United Kingdom order of precedence (gentlemen)	Succeeded by The Rt. Hon. The Earl Bathurst
