= Prejudice (legal term) =

Legal term

Prejudice is a legal term with different meanings, which depend on whether it is used in criminal, civil, or common law. In legal context, prejudice differs from the more common use of the word and so the term has specific technical meanings.

Two of the most common applications of the word are as part of the terms with prejudice and without prejudice. In general, an action taken with prejudice is final. For example, dismissal with prejudice forbids a party to refile the case and might occur because the court finds the alleged facts cannot form a valid claim, or due to misconduct on the part of the party that filed the claim or criminal complaint, or as the result of an out-of-court agreement or settlement. Dismissal without prejudice (Latin: salvis iuribus, lit. 'with preserved rights') allows the party the option to refile and is often a response to procedural or technical problems with the filing that the party may be able to correct by making a new or amended filing.

== Etymology ==
The origin of the word in its legal sense is Latin: prejūdicium, 'a preceding judgement or decision'.

== With prejudice and without prejudice ==
=== Criminal law ===
Depending on the country, a criminal proceeding which ends prematurely due to error, mistake, or misconduct may end as being dismissed with prejudice or without prejudice.

If the case ends without prejudice, the accused in the case (the defendant) may be retried. If the case ends with prejudice, the effect on the defendant (for the purpose of punishment) is the equivalent of a finding of not guilty, and they cannot be retried.

Some countries, however, allow the prosecution to appeal any acquittal.

==== United States ====
In the United States, if there is a mistrial, or the case is overturned on appeal, generally this is without prejudice. In the case of a decision overturned on appeal, the case is generally retried (or the parts of it that were overturned are retried, if only parts of it were overturned). If the case is dismissed because of prosecutorial misconduct, it will typically be dismissed with prejudice, which means that the defendant cannot be retried.

The Double Jeopardy Clause of the Fifth Amendment to the United States Constitution prohibits that "any person be subject for the same offence to be twice put in jeopardy of life or limb". Outside of mistrial or appeal, the rule for whether or not a case is dismissed with or without prejudice thus depends on what condition the case is in and whether "jeopardy" has attached to the case. If jeopardy is attached to a case, a dismissal or a resolution is "with prejudice" and the case can never be litigated again. In the case of a trial by jury, jeopardy attaches when the jury is empaneled, and a dismissal (for prosecutorial misconduct or harmful error) at that point must be with prejudice. In the case of a bench trial (trial by the judge only), jeopardy attaches when the first witness in the case is sworn.

If a criminal case is brought to trial and the defendant is acquitted, jeopardy is attached to the case, and it can never be retried. If the defendant was convicted and their conviction is overturned, jeopardy is not attached because the defendant is considered to simply be in the same state they were before the case was tried.

If a person is brought to trial where they are charged with a particular crime and is convicted of a lesser offense, the conviction for a lesser offense is an acquittal of any higher-level offense (for example, a conviction for second-degree murder is an acquittal of first-degree murder). If the conviction is later overturned, the maximum the defendant can be retried for is the crime to which they were convicted; any higher charge is acquitted and thus is with prejudice.

=== Civil law ===
Within legal civil procedure, prejudice is a loss or injury, and refers specifically to a formal determination against a claimed legal right or cause of action. Thus, in a civil case, dismissal without prejudice is a dismissal that allows for re-filing of the case in the future. The present action is dismissed, but the possibility remains open that the plaintiff may file another suit on the same claim. The inverse phrase is dismissal with prejudice, in which the plaintiff is barred from filing another case on the same claim. Dismissal with prejudice is a final judgment and the case becomes res judicata on the claims that were or could have been brought in it; dismissal without prejudice is not.

=== Common law ===
In many common law jurisdictions, such as the United States, the United Kingdom, Ireland, Canada, Australia, New Zealand, Hong Kong and Singapore, the phrase has several usages.

==== Dismissal ====
A civil matter which is "dismissed with prejudice" is over forever, because the claim cannot be refiled. This is a final judgment, not subject to further action, other than appeal to a higher court. Absent a successful appeal, the plaintiff is prohibited from bringing any other lawsuit based on the claim.

If it is an involuntary dismissal, the judge has determined that the plaintiff has brought the case in bad faith, has failed to bring the case in a reasonable time, has failed to comply with court procedures, or on the merits after hearing the arguments in court. The dismissal itself may be appealed.

If it is a "voluntary dismissal with prejudice", it is the result of an out-of-court agreement or settlement between parties that they agree is final.

If the case is dismissed "without prejudice", the lawsuit can be filed again by the plaintiff. Typically, before a defendant has answered the suit or made a motion in the case, a plaintiff may file for "dismissal without prejudice" more easily and may do so for tactical reasons such as filing in a different jurisdiction.

==== Settlement negotiations ====
The term "without prejudice" is used in the course of negotiations to settle a lawsuit. It indicates that a particular conversation or letter cannot be tendered as evidence in court. It can be considered a form of privilege. This usage flows from the primary meaning: concessions and representations made for the purpose of settlement are simply being mooted for that purpose, and are not meant to actually concede those points in litigation.

Such correspondences must both be made in the course of negotiation, and represent a genuine attempt to settle a dispute between the parties. A prohibition exists on documents marked "without prejudice" being used as a facade to conceal facts or evidence from the court. As a result, documents marked "without prejudice" that do not actually contain any offer of settlement may be used as evidence, should the matter proceed to court. Courts may also decide to exclude from evidence communications not marked "without prejudice" that do contain offers of settlement. A "narrow context" was identified in Family Housing Association (Manchester) Ltd v Michael Hyde and Partners in 1993, where without prejudice negotiations could be considered by a court dealing with a preliminary application to dismiss a claim: "If the application succeeds, the action will be at an end. If it fails, and the case proceeds to trial, the material will not be available to the trial judge".

The House of Lords' 2009 ruling in the case of Ofulue v Bossert UKHL 16 confirmed that the public policy intention behind the without prejudice rule, which serves to encourage the parties in dispute to speak freely in order to settle the issues between them, should enjoy "wide protection", and therefore only in exceptional cases could statements issued "without prejudice" be used in evidence.

The term "without prejudice save as to costs" is a change to the above and refers to a communication that cannot be exhibited in court until the end of the trial, when the court awards legal costs to the successful party unless some other order is made because an offer was unreasonably rejected. This is also called the Calderbank formula, from Calderbank v Calderbank (2 All E.R. 333, 1976), and exists because English courts have held that "without prejudice" includes for the purposes of costs, as in Court of Appeal, in Walker v. Wilshire (23 QBD 335, 1889):

Letters or conversations written or declared to be "without prejudice" cannot be taken into consideration in determining whether there is a good cause for depriving a successful litigant of costs.

== Statutory provision ==
UK freedom of information law renders certain information exempt from disclosure obligations where its publication "would, or would be likely to", prejudice any of the interests protected by statutory provision. Freedom of information jurisprudence on the test for "prejudice" was developed in the tribunal case of Hogan v Oxford City Council (2005), which ruled that the applicable interests to be protected need to be identified, along with the nature of the prejudice being contemplated, and the likelihood of the prejudice occurring. The term "likely" indicates "a high degree of probability": it does not need to reach a level of "more probable than not", but in some circumstances that level may be reached. Ultimately the word "likely" has "neither a single nor even a prima facie meaning".

== Prejudicial actions ==
An action (such as an error made by the court) is prejudicial if it substantially affects a litigant's legal rights. Thus, a harmless error would not be prejudicial, while plain error is sometimes defined as a highly prejudicial error. An error that is determined not to have been prejudicial will typically not be considered a reversible error.

A court may sometimes explicitly reassure a litigant that an action will not prejudice them. For example, if a defendant left an important document at home that was needed for the court hearing, the court may assure them that continuing the proceedings to a future date will not prejudice them in any way—that is, that it will not affect the court's judgment in a way that disfavors them. Or a court may assure a litigant that agreeing to a temporary arrangement, e.g. concerning custody of an asset whose ownership is disputed, will not prejudice their rights with regard to the eventual judgment of the court in the case. In other words, the litigant will not be waiving any rights other than those they're specifically agreeing to temporarily waive.

In English criminal law, from the moment a suspect is charged until judgment is given, it is not permitted to report on matters that may be given in evidence – or that might otherwise influence the jury – before this evidence is presented. Unless the court directs otherwise, media may report the evidence given in court but may not speculate on its significance. These restrictions are normally removed after judgment is given, unless to do so might prejudice another prosecution in progress.

== See also ==
- Nulla poena sine lege
- Termination with prejudice
  - "Terminate with extreme prejudice"
- Nemo iudex in causa sua – unbiasedness of judges or judgement
