= Swan Song (memoir) =

2026 memoir by Charles Spencer

- First edition
- Author: Charles Spencer, 9th Earl Spencer
- Language: English
- Publisher: Penguin Random House
- Publication date: 22 September 2026
- Pages: 384
- ISBN: 978-0-241-82559-4

Swan Song: Diana, My Sister is a memoir by Charles Spencer, 9th Earl Spencer, about his sister, Lady Diana Spencer. Diana became the Princess of Wales when she married Charles III, then heir to the British throne.

The book was published by Michael Joseph, an imprint of Penguin Random House, on 22 September 2026 in the United Kingdom, ahead of the 30th anniversary of Diana's death in August 2027. It will be translated into twelve languages.

== Background ==
The memoir chronicles the siblings' childhood, including their upbringing at the Spencer family estate, their parents' divorce, and their early education. It also examines Diana's marriage to Prince Charles (later King Charles III), her rise to global prominence, her humanitarian work, and the media scrutiny surrounding her personal life. Spencer said that he had been convinced to "write down my own thoughts and memories, once and for all, rather than having the discomfort of again reading the opinions of others, many of which are based on untruths that have become accepted over time", and that he aimed to tell "the truth" about Diana from his perspective as her brother and to speak on her behalf in an "openly positive way", as he did when he delivered the eulogy at her funeral at Westminster Abbey in 1997. He described his sister as "a one-off, dynamic character, full of love, charisma and self-doubt, who gave life a hell of a go, and left the world a far better place, despite exiting the stage while still so young".

A week before publication, four copies of the book were stolen from a lorry in the Netherlands. Spencer had three broadcast interviews to promote the book, all filmed at Althorp. An interview with him by Laura Kuenssberg on the BBC was broadcast on 20 September, as was an interview by Mark Phillips on CBS. A third interview by Maggie Rulli on Good Morning America was broadcast on 21 September on ABC. He also gave an exclusive interview to People magazine, and appeared on Lorraine on 23 September and on CBS Mornings and The Source with Kaitlan Collins on 28 September. He also sat for an interview with CBC's Matt Galloway on The Current, broadcast on 29 September.

== Content and response ==
In the book, Spencer makes several allegations. He believes that Diana showed "key ADHD symptoms" during childhood and probably also suffered from dyslexia. He adds that she attempted to end the engagement after the then-Prince Charles had shown "next to no interest in her" at his brother the then-Prince Andrew's 21st birthday party, shortly after she had found a bracelet he had bought for his now‑wife Camilla. He wrote that Diana had confided in a close friend that her husband-to-be told her the day before their wedding that "she needed to know he was very happy to marry her, but he was not actually in love with her". He additionally mentioned that Diana would have "explosive outbursts when she was at her unhappiest" and that, in her later years, she "drove herself more than once to Beachy Head" while contemplating suicide, but that her love for her sons prevented her from taking her own life. He revealed that she once pushed their stepmother Raine down the staircase in a fit of anger. Spencer also recounts a conversation in which Diana told him she was getting a divorce and said "my husband is in love with his valet" – a statement he later described as "improbable". He also mentions that Diana recounted with "revulsion" how, early in her relationship with Dodi Fayed, his father Mohamed Al-Fayed had "dropped a hand onto her buttocks and squeezed them while saying in a leery, suggestive tone, 'And in Egypt, father-in-law gets first go…'". Spencer also alleged that his father, John Spencer, once had a romantic connection with Princess Elizabeth (later Elizabeth II), which was ended by Lord Mountbatten.

Spencer further alleged that Prince Charles sounded "giddily elated – like a lottery winner" in a phone call after the news of Diana's death. Lady Glenconner, once engaged to the writer's father and lady-in-waiting to Princess Margaret, denounced this as "absolute rubbish". Spencer said he told the prince that Diana would not have wanted William and Harry to walk behind her coffin. According to Spencer, this angered the prince, who "unleashed down the phone what I have always taken to be his pent-up contempt for Diana, and his horror that the world was so bowled over by her death. 'Rest assured,' he hissed, 'we'll forget her soon enough!'" Spencer wrote that Prince Philip overruled his son on the arrangements for the funeral procession, allowing Spencer to take centre stage as he was representing his sister. Spencer stated that the palace wrongly overruled Diana's wish for Mozart's Requiem to be played at her funeral, saying it was not permitted at, "a Church of England funeral", which he later alleged was untrue. He added that on the morning of Diana's funeral "I could not get over how tiny, and slight, and bereft, Harry looked" while William "looked more self-possessed" and showed remarkable "composure and maturity" and became his "secondary concern" at that moment. He also confirmed that Queen Elizabeth II had offered to restore Diana's HRH style posthumously, an offer he declined, though he later questioned whether he had made the right decision.

Buckingham Palace responded: "While we do not comment on books as a matter of principle, His Majesty is mindful that the pain of fraternal grief can cloud reason, affect judgment and colour memory in ways others do not recognise, even many years after such a loss." Spencer told the BBC that he stood by his account, saying he had only ever had two phone calls with Prince Charles and was "hyper alert" to the prince's words.

Journalist Piers Morgan said he would sue Spencer, denying Spencer's allegation that he was responsible for publishing intrusive gym photographs of Diana taken with a hidden camera. He noted that the images appeared in the Sunday Mirror in 1993, "nearly two years before I became editor of the Daily Mirror", and described the memoir as containing "fabricated inaccuracies". In a statement, Spencer acknowledged the error and apologised to Morgan, but affirmed Morgan's "surly" and annoyed manner when he uninvited him by telephone call from Diana's funeral in 1997. The publisher stated that they would be amending this one point in future editions of the book. Morgan described Spencer's account of their phone call as "deeply misleading", calling into question the accuracy of his account involving his telephone conversations with the then-Prince Charles. He added that he would still pursue legal action against Spencer and his publisher, demanding that the false passages be removed, the book be withdrawn from sale and pulped, with any potential damages to be paid to the King's Trust.

== Reception ==
Reviewing the book for The Guardian, Emma Brockes described Swan Song as "a fascinating document that tells us a little about Diana and a great deal about Charles Spencer." Brockes highlighted the passages about Diana, which she praised as "affectionate, sad, and lovely in places", but criticised Spencer's tone of "self pity and self regard" elsewhere in the book. In a review in The Daily Telegraph, Anita Singh criticised the book's pomposity, arguing that it was less a loving tribute to Diana and more "a loving tribute to himself". Singh also said that the book's portrayal of Diana's childhood memories differed from Diana's own recollections.

Tom Peck of The Times described the book as having "mainly outrageous and unprovable accusations made against his sister's ex-husband." Alexandra Jacobs, writing in The New York Times, described it as an "elegant and reproving" memoir; she noted its affectionate portrayal of Diana and vivid accounts of their childhood, while highlighting Spencer's criticism of members of the royal family and the press. In a book review for The Observer, freelance journalist Tanya Gold described the book as "strange and self-deceptive", arguing that it was not Diana's swan song, but his own; she also characterised Spencer as "an unreliable narrator".

Anna Whitelock, a professor of the history of modern monarchy at City St George's, University of London, wrote in her review for the Financial Times that Spencer's portrait of the "People's Princess" may be "pacy and gossipy", but "it is very much Spencer's brooding, vengeful first-person narrative, underpinned by an overwhelming sense of entitlement". Whitelock also criticised that Spencer cited very few sources throughout the book and made no attempt to verify his own claims. In her review for The New Statesman, Nicola Shulman, Marchioness of Normanby wrote that while Spencer alleges to speak for Diana in this book, it ironically reveals "how little he understood her".

Writing in The Wall Street Journal, author Catherine Ostler notes that while the book claims to praise Diana, Spencer makes her sound like "a borderline psychopath". She also views the book as "an elaborate, binary game of saints and sinners": the Spencers are portrayed as saints while the royals are sinners; Spencer’s parents are saints, whereas his stepmother, a sinner.

According to a new poll shared exclusively with Sky News, the biggest allegations in Spencer's book did not affect the King's popularity. More respondents did not believe the accusations than those who believed them. In addition, 53% believed that Spencer's motive for writing the book was money. Another poll released by YouGov showed that 31% believed Spencer's allegations, while 36% did not believe them and 33% said they did not know.
