= Lady Amelia Spencer =

British model

Lady Amelia Spencer Mallett
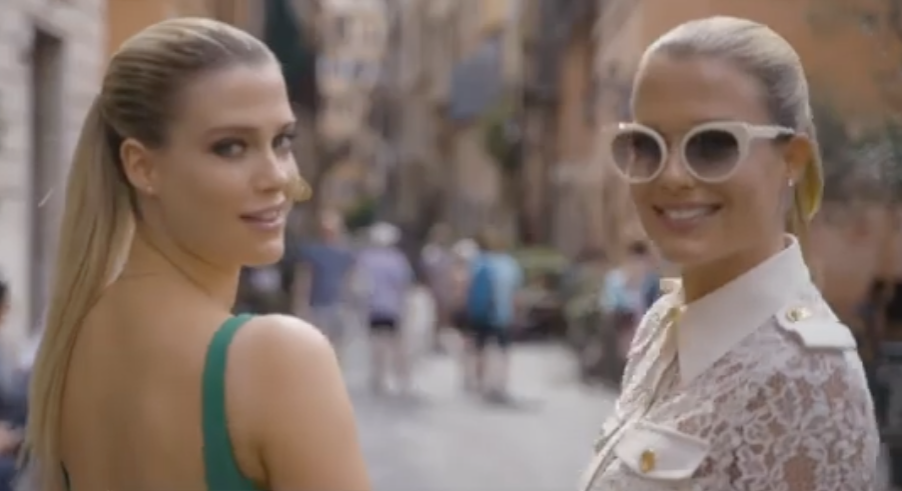
- Amelia (left) and Eliza Spencer in 2023
- Born: Katya Amelia Spencer; 10 July 1992 (age 34); St Mary's Hospital, London, England
- Education: Reddam House
- Alma mater: University of Cape Town
- Occupations: Model; socialite
- Spouse: Greg Mallett (m. 2023)
- Parents: Charles Spencer, 9th Earl Spencer (father); Victoria Lockwood (mother)
- Relatives: Lady Eliza Spencer (twin sister); Lady Kitty Spencer (sister); Louis Spencer, Viscount Althorp (brother); Diana, Princess of Wales (aunt)
- Family: Spencer

Lady Katya Amelia Spencer Mallett (née Spencer; born 10 July 1992) is a British model and socialite. She is a daughter of Charles Spencer, 9th Earl Spencer, niece of Diana, Princess of Wales and first cousin of William, Prince of Wales and Prince Harry, Duke of Sussex.

== Early life and family ==
Lady Katya Amelia Spencer was born on 10 July 1992 at St Mary's Hospital, London to Charles Spencer, 9th Earl Spencer, and his first wife, Victoria Lockwood. She was born a minute after her identical twin sister, Lady Eliza Spencer. Lady Amelia is a member of the Spencer family, an English noble family that holds multiple peerages. Her paternal aunt was Diana, Princess of Wales and she is a first cousin of William, Prince of Wales, and Prince Harry, Duke of Sussex. Lady Amelia has two older sisters, Lady Kitty Spencer and Lady Eliza Spencer, and an younger brother― Louis Spencer, Viscount Althorp ― and four younger half-siblings through her father's second marriage to Caroline Freud and third marriage to Karen Gordon and her mother's second marriage to Jonathan Aitken.

She was raised in Cape Town, South Africa, where she attended Reddam House, a private school. After her parents divorced in 1997, Lady Amelia spent her time between her native United Kingdom with her father and South Africa with her mother. Spencer studied at the University of Cape Town.

== Career and public life ==
In 2025, she and her sister, Eliza, became brand ambassadors for Aspinal of London and were featured in a 1960s-inspired campaign.

In October 2025, she attended the British Museum's first Pink Ball. She also attended the 2025 Fashion Trust Arabia Awards at the National Museum of Qatar in Doha and the 2025 British Fashion Awards.

== Personal life ==
On 21 March 2023, Spencer married Greg Mallett, the nephew of former South African national rugby coach Nick Mallett, in South Africa. They met as undergraduates at the University of Cape Town.
