= Whole Child International =

Whole Child International is a U.S.-based non-governmental organization (NGO) founded in 2004. Whole Child focuses on improving the quality of care for vulnerable children worldwide by working within childcare institutions (orphanages) and in limited-resource childcare centers where children often show the same unmet developmental needs and poor outcomes as those in orphanages. Whole Child's program is built as a countrywide collaboration, working together with a national government and a major local university to implement a unified strategy across a nation's childcare system.

Millions of vulnerable children around the world do not receive adequate care and suffer from a lack of stable, supportive relationships. This is particularly true for children in developing countries growing up in orphanages, those from low-income families who spend the majority of their day in early childcare centers and those being bounced around foster care. While the global community tackles some of the underlying issues facing these children, their immediate developmental and emotional needs are not being met, resulting in stunted development, high levels of criminality, and other adverse outcomes, reinforcing the cycle of poverty.

Whole Child International creates a nationwide program to establish high-quality care as a basic standard that is provided to all children, in any setting in which they receive that care. We work within the local child welfare system to build capacity within local universities, local government and caregiving staff. Together with existing stakeholders we make the changes necessary to build stable, family-like environments that enable proper child development — ensuring that all children can fulfill their promise as productive members of society.

== Theory of Change ==
Whole Child's model is based on the theories of Hungarian pediatrician Emmi Pikler (1902–1984), the Reggio Emilia approach to Early Childhood Education, and other sources. The Pikler Institute, in Budapest, Hungary, was founded in 1946 to care for children orphaned and abandoned during the Second World War. Pikler's methodology involves increasing opportunities for meaningful attachment and bonding between caregiver and child through "continuity of care."

Continuity of care ensures that children have one consistent caregiver instead of multiple caregivers over a long period of time. It additionally consists of small groups assigned to a single caregiver to replace larger, more chaotic populations randomly assigned to an often non-continuous staff. Research has found that children with secure attachment relationships with their caregivers are more likely to play and explore and to interact with other adults (Raikes, 1996). Conversely, more frequent changes in caregivers have been reported to be associated with negative child outcomes including high levels of distress (Cryer et al., 2005) withdrawing behaviors and higher levels of aggression later on (Howes & Hamilton, 1993).

== Program Implementation and History ==
Karen Spencer, a Canadian-born American social entrepreneur, founded Whole Child in 2004. She was motivated by the plight of institutionalized children and a lack of major organizations committing to working within orphanages as long as children continue to live in them. Whole Child's early program development was done in collaboration with the University of Central America in Managua, Nicaragua, as well as the Pikler Institute, the Center for Excellence in Child Development at the University of California, Davis, and the Office of Child Development at the University of Pittsburgh, and the WestEd Center for Child and Family Studies.

Working with the government of Nicaragua, Whole Child conducted its initial work in varied institutional settings in Managua, Nicaragua. In 2006, Whole Child began training caregivers at the El Diviño Niño children's home in Managua to improve the quality of childcare given to their children, and after the program expanded to other settings of varying sizes and populations, the Inter-American Development Bank granted Whole Child a $500,000 technical collaboration to expand and develop the work.

The Clinton Global Initiative (CGI) recognized the early work of Whole Child International, and in 2009 Whole Child was selected as "one of the top NGOs" in the CGI membership roster. With funding from the Inter-American Development Bank, TACA Airlines, and other donors, Whole Child programs in Nicaragua were scaled through their 2009 Clinton Global Initiative Commitment to Action, "Elevating Early Childhood Care in Latin America." The organization also had visionary early support by Tom Mower of SISEL International, its founder Karen Spencer, and others who have been drawn to its unique social-entrepreneurial approach to solving a seemingly intractable social problem.

In 2014, the Inter-American Development Bank granted Whole Child a $1 million technical collaboration to implement the resulting program in neighboring El Salvador, whose government is an active collaborator in the project along with the University of Central America in San Salvador.

In 2017, USAID awarded Whole Child $4.9 million for the "Protection and Quality Care for Children" Project in El Salvador, a $7.4 million effort to address "the rights and needs of El Salvador’s most vulnerable children by strengthening the national child protection system and improving quality of care for all children," according to USAID. The project is a collaboration between the two organizations along with the Salvadoran government, Duke University Global Health Institute Center for Health Policy and Inequalities Research, the University of Southern California School of Social Work, and the University of Central America in San Salvador, among other organizations.
