= TFG Limited =

South African retail corporation

- Formerly: Foschini Limited
- Type: Public
- Traded as: JSE: TFG
- ISIN: ZAE000148466
- Industry: Retail
- Founded: 1924; 102 years ago
- Founder: George Ivan Rosenthal
- Headquarters: Cape Town, South Africa
- Number of locations: 4,914 (2026)
- Area served: Africa; United Kingdom; Oceania
- Key people: Michael Lewis (Chairman); Anthony Thunström (CEO)
- Products: Clothing; Footwear; Jewellery; Cosmetics; Sporting goods Furniture; Homeware
- Brands: Foschini; Markham; Sportscene; Totalsports; Jet @home Bash; Phase Eight; Hobbs
- Revenue: ▲ R67.07 billion (2026)
- Operating income: ▼ R3.91 billion (2026)
- Net income: ▼ R1.31 billion (2026)
- Total assets: ▲ R60.2 billion (2026)
- Total equity: ▼ R24.9 billion (2026)
- Number of employees: 50,861 (2026)
- Divisions: TFG Africa; TFG London; TFG Australia
- Subsidiaries: TFG Retailers; Foschini Retail Group
- Website: tfglimited.co.za

TFG Limited (commonly known as TFG, and formerly The Foschini Group) is a major South African retail group. Founded in 1924, the company is headquartered in Cape Town. Its retail interests span sectors including clothing, jewelry, homeware, furniture, décor, footwear, and sportswear.

TFG operates a large number of retail chain store brands, including Foschini, Jet, Relay Jeans, @home, Coricraft, Volpes, American Swiss, Galaxy & Co, Sterns, Sportscene, and Totalsports. Various TFG retailers form part of Bash, the company's multi-brand online store.

As of 2026, TFG has a total of 4,914 across Africa, the UK, and Oceania, and employs around 51,000 people.

== History ==
=== Early history ===
George Ivan Rosenthal founded Foschini in 1924, after moving from the United States to South Africa. He opened the first Foschini store on Pritchard Street in Johannesburg on 27 November 1925. The business expanded rapidly, opening nine stores within its first two years, and establishing itself as a national women's clothing retailer.

In 1941, Foschini became the first South African clothing retailer to list on the JSE.

In 1958, Stanley Lewis acquired a major shareholding in the company and subsequently oversaw a period of rapid expansion and diversification.

During the late 1960s, the company began expanding beyond its original women's clothing business. It acquired the American Swiss Watch Company in 1967, and Markham in 1968. Foschini also launched Pages in 1969, as a lower-priced clothing chain. These moves established the diversified retail model that would increasingly define the group.

Foschini continued expanding its portfolio during the 1990s. It acquired jewelry retailer Sterns in 1993, launched clothing brand DonnaClaire in 1994, and acquired sportswear retailer Sportscene in 1996. Pages was rebranded as Exact in 1999, while the group also developed RCS as a financial services business, extending its activities beyond conventional retailing.

=== Diversification and the TFG name ===
In 2000, the group acquired sportswear retail chain Totalsports, and launched the Matrix jewellery brand. It subsequently launched homewear retailer @home, as well as Fashion Express in 2001, and DueSouth in 2004. In 2005, the group launched @homelivingspace and Luella.

The growing diversity of the business led Foschini Limited to change its name to The Foschini Group Limited (TFG) in September 2010. The change was intended to reflect the company's broad diversification.

In 2011, TFG acquired Fabiani, and obtained the South African franchise rights for G-Star RAW. In 2012, the company acquired Prestige Clothing and launched the mobile and technology retailer hi. The acquisition of Prestige Clothing also marked a greater emphasis on local manufacturing and supply chain integration.

In 2014, TFG agreed to sell its interest in RCS to BNP Paribas Personal Finance and Standard Bank.

=== International expansion ===
TFG began a major international expansion in 2015 with the acquisition of an 85% interest in British women's fashion retailer Phase Eight, for approximately R2.9 billion.

In 2017, TFG acquired Australian specialty menswear company Retail Apparel Group for approximately R3 billion. The acquisition gave the group a substantial presence in Australia and New Zealand through brands including Connor, Johnny Bigg, Tarocash, yd., and Rockwear.

In 2017, TFG acquired UK women's clothing retailer Hobbs.

In 2020, TFG received approval from the South African Competition Commission to acquire clothing retailer Jet from Edcon. The acquisition completed in September that year, adding hundreds of budget retail stores to TFG's portfolio.

In 2021, the group established TFG Labs to accelerate its digital transformation and continued investments in local manufacturing and supply chain capabilities.

=== Expansion of homeware, digital retail, and manufacturing ===
In 2022, TFG acquired Tapestry Home Brands for approximately R2.2 billion. The acquisition brought furniture company Coricraft, Dial-a-Bed, The Bed Store, and linen retailer Volpes into the group and significantly expanded TFG's presence in homeware and furniture while strengthening its local manufacturing capabilities.

Also in 2022, TFG launched digital retailer Bash in public beta, and then officially launched the site in February 2023, as a fashion and lifestyle e-commerce platform that brought together TFG's previously separate online retail operations. The platform consolidated products from more than 15 TFG store brands, and subsequently became a central component of the group's omnichannel strategy.

In 2023, TFG acquired Street Fever, an independent South African retailer of affordable branded footwear and apparel. Most of its stores were subsequently integrated into Sneaker Factory, expanding TFG's presence in the value footwear market.

In 2024, TFG opened its Riverfields distribution center in Gauteng. The group also entered into a franchise agreement with JD Sports Fashion to bring the JD Sports brand to SA.

=== Recent developments ===
In October 2024, TFG acquired British fashion and lifestyle retailer White Stuff.

In March 2026, TFG operated over 4,900 outlets and 40 brands across Africa, the UK, and Oceania. At the time, online sales accounted for 14.8% of the company's total retail sales.

== Operations ==
As of 2026, TFG divisions and brands included:

| Type | Brand | Established * | Acquired | Ref |
|---|---|---|---|---|
| Clothing | Foschini | 1925; 101 years ago | | |
| Clothing | Exact | 1999; 27 years ago (rebranded) | | |
| Clothing | Fabiani | 1978; 48 years ago | 2011; 15 years ago | |
| Clothing | Markham | 1873; 153 years ago | 1968; 58 years ago | |
| Clothing | G-Star RAW | 1989; 37 years ago | 2011; 15 years ago (franchise rights) | |
| Clothing | Relay Jeans | 2019; 7 years ago (stand-alone brand) | | |
| Clothing | Jet | 1965; 61 years ago | 2020; 6 years ago | |
| Clothing | Phase Eight | 1979; 47 years ago | 2015; 11 years ago | |
| Clothing | Hobbs | 1981; 45 years ago | 2017; 9 years ago | |
| Clothing | yd. | 1996; 30 years ago | | |
| Homeware and furniture | @home | 2001; 25 years ago | | |
| Homeware and furniture | Coricraft | 1995; 31 years ago | 2022; 4 years ago | |
| Homeware and furniture | Dial-a-Bed | 1996; 30 years ago | 2022; 4 years ago | |
| Homeware and furniture | Jet Home | 2022; 4 years ago | | |
| Homeware and furniture | Volpes | 1929; 97 years ago | 2022; 4 years ago | |
| Jewelry and watches | American Swiss | 1896; 130 years ago | 1967; 59 years ago | |
| Jewelry and watches | Galaxy & Co | 2020; 6 years ago (online launch) | | |
| Jewelry and watches | Sterns | 1986; 40 years ago | 1993; 33 years ago | |
| Footwear, sportswear, and sporting goods | JD Sports | 2024; 2 years ago (South African launch) | 2024; 2 years ago (franchise agreement) | |
| Footwear, sportswear, and sporting goods | Sneaker Factory | 2020; 6 years ago | | |
| Footwear, sportswear, and sporting goods | Sportscene | 1996; 30 years ago | 1996; 30 years ago | |
| Footwear, sportswear, and sporting goods | Totalsports | 1982; 44 years ago | 2000; 26 years ago | |
| Technology and mobile | hi | 2012; 14 years ago | | |
| E-commerce | Bash | 2023; 3 years ago (official launch) | | |

* Established as a brand, not necessarily within TFG

== See also ==
- Retailing in South Africa
- Manufacturing in South Africa
