= Antler (brand) =

British company

Antler Ltd
- Type: Limited Company
- Industry: Luggage
- Founded: 1914
- Founder: John Boultbee Brooks
- Headquarters: London, United Kingdom
- Key people: Kirsty Glenne (MD)
- Products: Luggage
- Owners: ATR Holdings Ltd
- Website: Antler.co.uk

Antler is a British company that has been designing and manufacturing luggage since 1914. The company is currently headquartered in London, United Kingdom.

== History ==
=== 1914–1930 ===
John Boultbee Brooks a famous bicycle seat manufacturer Brooks England, founded Antler in Criterion Works, Birmingham in 1914, producing leather wardrobe trunks for ocean voyages and unique motor trunks designed to be attached to cars. His interest in wildlife prompted him to adopt a stag’s head and antlers as the official brand symbol for the luggage line, which remains the firm's logo to this day.

=== 1940s ===
World War II led Antler to start producing haversacks, webbing belts and military equipment. After the war, the firm reverted to its original product line, introducing soft-sided luggage.

=== 1950s ===
Tourism boomed in the 1950s as air travel became more accessible and affordable. Antler needed to adjust to consumer demands, with products that combined soft and hard materials and fabrics in one suitcase.

=== 1960s ===
By 1965, Antler employed 400 workers and exported their products internationally.

=== Today ===
In 2010, Lloyds Development Capital (L.D.C.) backed a management buyout of Antler. Following this, Antler left its headquarters in Bury, Greater Manchester in 2013, relocating to Central London. This was followed by a number of changes, most notably the relaunch of RevelationLondon, Antler's sister brand, in 2016.

In 2017, Antler was sold to Endless LLP. In 2020, Antler was sold again, to ATR Holdings, went into administration in May of that year as the effects of the pandemic on travel took their toll. The company announced it was out of administration on 20 July 2020 as a new registered company, ATR Brands Ltd, trading as Antler. The new company's headquarters are on Dover Street, London.

In July 2020, the British luggage brand Antler was acquired by Strandbags.
