= Louis Spencer, Viscount Althorp =

British aristocrat and polo player

Viscount Althorp
- Born: Louis Frederick John Spencer; 14 March 1994 (age 32); St Mary's Hospital, London, England
- Other name: Louis Lyons
- Education: Diocesan College; University of Edinburgh; Arts Educational Schools
- Occupation: Actor
- Parents: Charles Spencer, 9th Earl Spencer (father); Victoria Lockwood (mother)
- Relatives: Lady Kitty Spencer (sister); Lady Eliza Spencer (sister); Lady Amelia Spencer (sister); Diana, Princess of Wales (aunt)
- Family: Spencer

Louis Frederick John Spencer, Viscount Althorp (born 14 March 1994), is a British actor and aristocrat. He is the eldest son and heir-apparent of Charles Spencer, 9th Earl Spencer, the nephew of Diana, Princess of Wales, and the first cousin of William, Prince of Wales and Prince Harry, Duke of Sussex.

== Early life and education ==
Louis Frederick John Spencer was born on 14 March 1994 at St Mary's Hospital, London, the fourth child and eldest son of Charles Spencer, 9th Earl Spencer, and his first wife, Victoria Lockwood. A nephew of Diana, Princess of Wales, and a first cousin of William, Prince of Wales and Prince Harry, Duke of Sussex, he is the heir apparent to the Spencer earldom.

A year after Spencer was born, his family moved to Cape Town in South Africa, where he grew up.

Spencer was a pupil at Diocesan College in Cape Town, and later enrolled at the University of Edinburgh. He graduated from Arts Educational Schools in London on 6 September 2022 as the valedictorian.

== Career ==
As of 2025, Spencer is an actor working under the professional name "Louis Lyons".

== Viscount Althorp ==
In line with the tradition of English male primogeniture, the original creation granted the earldom to the first earl "and the Heirs Male of his Body lawfully begotten". As a result, Spencer, not his elder sister, Lady Kitty Spencer, who is her father's firstborn child, will inherit the Spencer title. Property is divisible separately, but most peers choose to keep property and title combined. As heir to the Spencer earldom, he is expected to inherit the estimated £100 million Althorp estate under the tradition of male primogeniture, despite having three older sisters.
