= Antony Edwards-Stuart =

Sir Antony Edwards-Stuart
- Royal coat of arms of the United Kingdom

Justice of the High Court
- In office 31 October 2009 – 2 November 2016

Personal details
- Born: 2 November 1946 (age 79) Sydney, Australia
- Children: 4
- Education: St Catharine's College, Cambridge

Sir Antony James Cobham Edwards-Stuart (born 2 November 1946) is a retired judge of the High Court of England and Wales.

== Education ==
He was educated at Sherborne School, the Royal Military Academy Sandhurst and St Catharine's College, Cambridge.

== Career ==
Edwards-Stuart was called to the bar at Gray's Inn in 1976 and became a bencher there in 2009. He was appointed QC in 1991, recorder in from 1997, deputy judge of the High Court in 2003, and judge of the High Court of Justice (Queen's Bench Division) in 2009. He was Judge in Charge of the Technology and Construction Court from September 2013 until his mandatory retirement upon reaching the age of 70 in November 2016.
