= Settlement offer =

Offer to end a civil lawsuit out of court

A settlement offer or offer to settle is an offer to resolve an outstanding issue or account. This may involve a statutory offer to compromise in a civil lawsuit. In either case, it involves communication from one party to the other suggesting a settlement, or an agreement to fully and finally resolve the outstanding issue, account, or dispute. In some jurisdictions, if one party makes a settlement offer, and the other party rejects it, this rejection can limit the ability of the other party to recover costs that would have been saved had the settlement offer been accepted.

== United Kingdom ==
In England and Wales, offers to settle are governed by Part 36 of the Civil Procedure Rules. The rules were significantly changed in 2015 to reflect developments in case law. These changes included provision for a settlement offer to be time-limited and to be automatically withdrawn if not accepted by a specified time. One factor leading to change was an Appeal Court hearing in the case of Gibbon v Manchester City Council (2010), where "the central question raised [was] whether Part 36 embodies a self-contained code or is subject to the general law of offer and acceptance insofar as it fails expressly to provide otherwise".

An offer of settlement may be called a Part 36 offer, Calderbank Offer, Calderbank Letter, or Offer of Compromise. A Part 36 offer must be evidenced in writing. Part 36 does not apply directly where a dispute is being addressed via arbitration, but its principles were applied by Edwards-Stuart J in Paul Price v Ian Carter, where an application was made to enforce an arbitration award and a counter-claim was made to set it aside.

Under Scots law, a "pursuer's offer in settlement" plays a similar role "in promoting and encouraging early settlement of cases".

== United States ==
In the US, evidence of settlement discussions generally, and of settlement offers specifically, is generally inadmissible in court. This is a policy-based exclusion, intended to encourage the settlement of cases out of court, thus freeing up the resources of the court system. In many jurisdictions, written agreement between the litigants may become binding agreements pursuant to the rules of procedure.

=== Arizona ===
In Arizona, the Rules of Civil Procedure 80 governs binding settlement agreements in civil court and rule 69 of the Arizona Rules of Family Law Procedure governs binding agreements in family court.

=== Connecticut ===
In Connecticut an offer of compromise is governed by Connecticut General Statute 52-192a. An offer of compromise is a pleading that gets filed with a court to settle a case for a specific amount of money. If the opposing party accepts the offer the case is over. An offer of compromise can first be filed 180 days after the date of service in standard negligence cases and 365 days in medical malpractice cases. An offer of compromise can add a significant amount of money to a case. Interest runs at a rate of 8% over the offer amount and relate back to the date the lawsuit was filed.

=== Florida ===
In the US state of Florida the offer of a judgment and demand for judgment in negligence-based torts are governed by Title XLV (Torts) Chapter 768 (Negligence): 768.79 "Offer of judgment and demand for judgment". It is also governed by rule 1.442 of the Florida Rules for Civil Procedure "Proposals for Settlement". This process involves making an offer by either party and how the judgment amount affects whether legal fees and costs will be awarded.

== Australia ==
Like the United Kingdom, Australia may call settlement offers Calderbank offers, or offers of compromise, pursuant to rule 20.26 of the Uniform Civil Procedure Rules.

A Calderbank offer can be made in writing or orally. Oral offers may create evidentiary issues such that less weight is given to the offer. An effective offer can be made before action. Calderbank Offers and Calderbank Letters often have a major impact on the allocation, by courts, of legal costs between parties.

== See also ==
- Tort reform
- Offer of judgment
