= Bail in the United Kingdom =

Bail in the United Kingdom is the practice of releasing individuals from police custody or from remand subject to certain conditions which are designed to enable criminal justice outcomes, primarily trials and police investigations, to be completed efficiently and effectively. The right to bail is guaranteed in a wide range of contexts but is not absolute. The legal systems of England and Wales, Northern Ireland and of Scotland each deal with bail in similar but distinct ways. Bail can be granted by the courts, the police and certain other criminal justice authorities including the Serious Fraud Office (SFO) and Financial Conduct Authority (FCA).

Bail in this context is distinct from the bail bonds system applied in the United States, and the approaches of the two systems differ markedly. The United Kingdom's approach to bail is more comparable to other common law jurisdictions including Canada, Australia, New Zealand and a number of Commonwealth nations, and British Overseas Territories to which English law applies directly.

Immigration bail refers to the practice of releasing individuals from immigration detention subject to conditions. It is a separate system from that of criminal offences bail. Unlike with bail in criminal offences, immigration bail does not necessarily occur because of a suspicion that the person has acted unlawfully, though this may be a reason for detention. It is common for government officials or law enforcement agents to make immigration bail decisions on behalf of the Secretary of State. The First Tier Tribunal (Immigration and Asylum Chamber) may also make immigration bail decisions.

== History ==
=== In England and Wales ===
The concept of using a monetary debt to ensure individual compliance with the justice system was developed in a decentralised manner across Anglo-Saxon communities in Great Britain. This system became increasingly centralised and legalised after the Norman Conquest. Strong statutory principles limiting the extent, nature and procedure for setting bail occurred in the 17th century during the English Civil War period. These are thought to have heavily influenced the nascent bail principles of the United States, including the Eighth Amendment to the United States Constitution.

==== Bail in the Anglo-Saxon era ====
In Anglo-Saxon England, violence and feuding were a real and socially destabilising route used to correct actual or perceived wrongs. These approaches were originally incorporated into the primitive legal system via the process of outlawing and 'hue and cry' communal vigilantism. Over time, localised justice was increasingly stripped of violence through the system of 'bots', private payments to compensate grievances, and 'wites', payments to the monarch. As wrongdoing was essentially still a private affair, a value payment was a simple, non-violent solution. As prisons were not a functional system for holding individuals securely at the time, fleeing to avoid justice was a systemic risk. To combat this risk alleged wrongdoers were allowed to pay 'bail', at the exact equivalent value of their bot, in exchange for going free until the date of trial. Some crimes, however, remained so serious that only custody was appropriate.

==== Bail in the medieval era ====
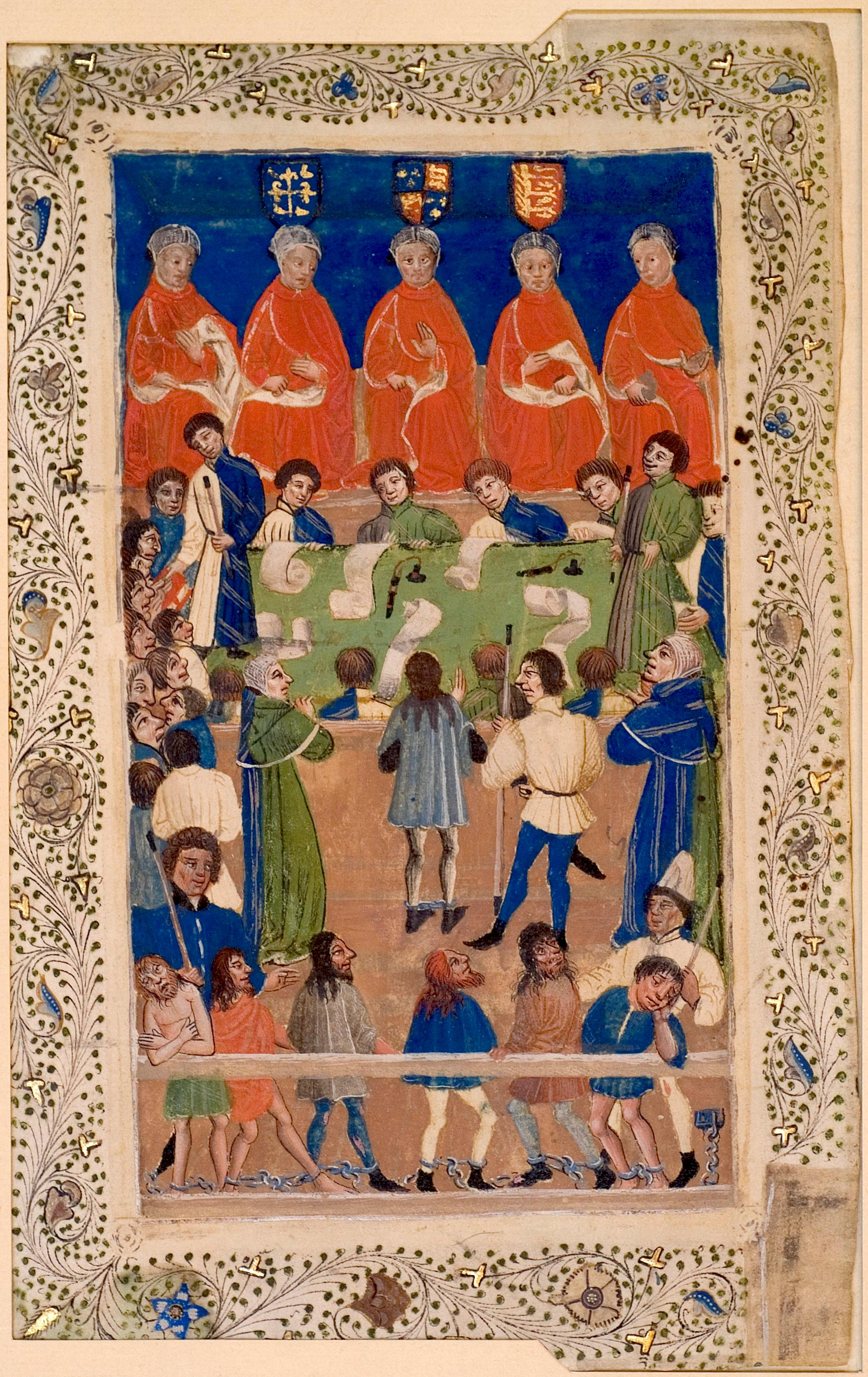
The Court of King's Bench

After the Norman conquest of England, three practical pressures on the state influenced a more complex bail system: fear of corporal punishment, a poor prison system and a slow trial process. As criminal justice was increasingly centralised, the state became responsible for holding alleged wrongdoers until trial. Jails were unsanitary and dangerous places, inadequate to be widely used. At the same time the increased use of corporal punishment encouraged individuals to flee before trial. This use of corporal punishment has been linked by Cabrone to the spiralling increase in bail securities and sureties. In the original bot system a security was equal to the estimated value of the wrong. By the medieval era however, fear of the punishment after conviction had become so great that people were willing to abandon their securities to avoid the physical violence meted out by the courts. As a result these sums had to be increased so as to reduce the incentive to escape justice.

In order to limit escape without the use of jails, sheriffs were given powers under royal authority to hold wrongdoers in their jurisdiction until the travelling judges of the circuit courts came to the area. The sheriffs used the bail bond system to control unimprisoned defendants awaiting trial, but in doing so corruption became widespread. In response Parliament passed the first Statute of Westminster (1275), setting three governing principles for bail in statute. First, the nature of the offence established whether or not bail was a possibility. It was now a statutory principle that some crimes were not suitable for release on bail. Second, the likelihood of conviction had to be considered – if a person was under 'light suspicion' they were more likely to be granted bail. Third, the criminal history or bad character of the defendant, known as 'ill-fame', was considered. Bad character suggested a person was less likely to follow the bail requirements and return to stand trial. However, problems of corruption remained and were exacerbated by a growing confusion about the exact meaning of 'light suspicion' and 'ill-fame'. As a result, clarifying amendments were made to these bail principles in 1486, requiring two justices of the peace to assess the likelihood of conviction, and in 1554, requiring the justices' decision be made in an open hearing and recorded in writing.

==== Bail in the 17th century ====
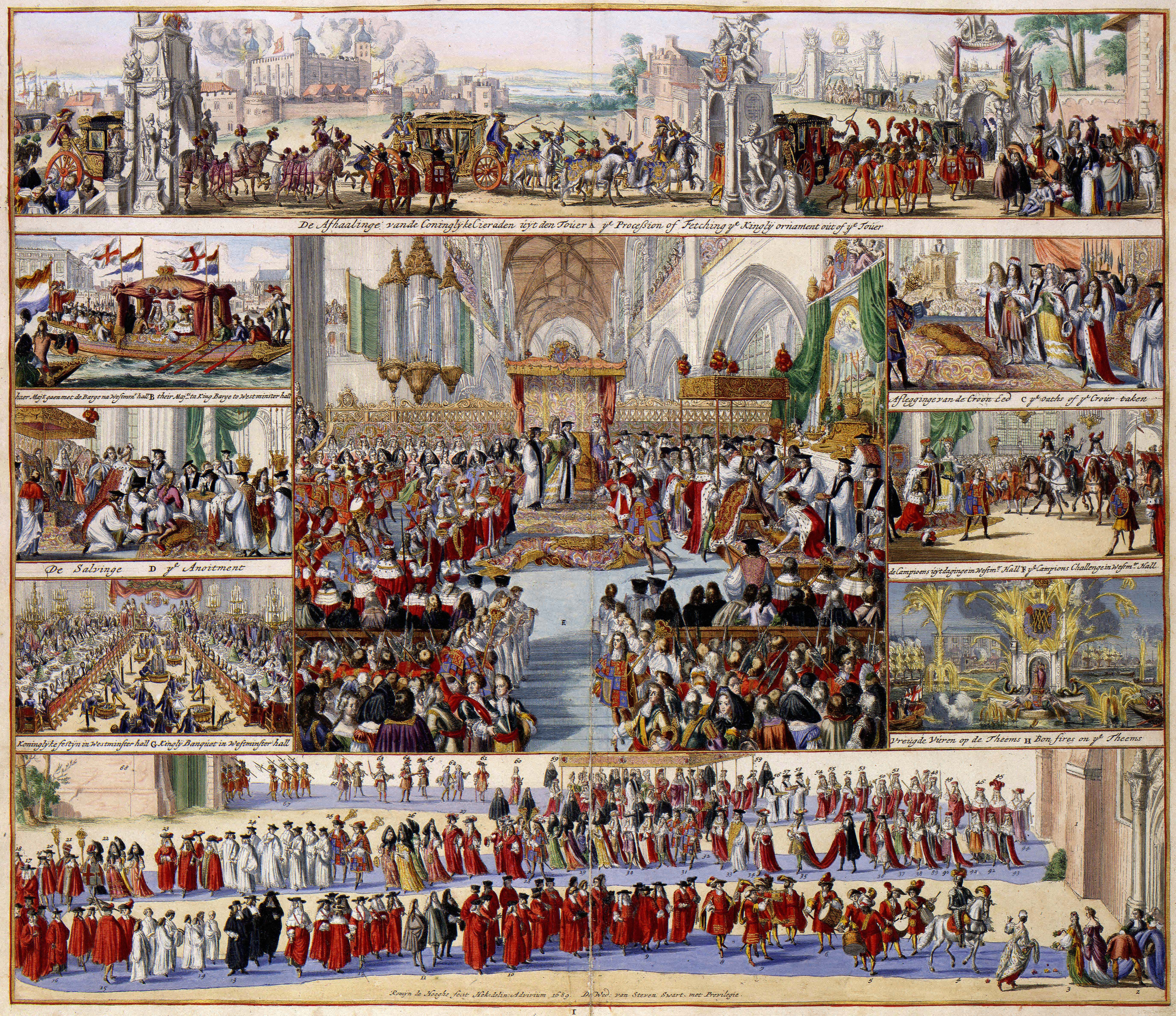
The Bill of Rights was confirmed as law on the accession of William III and Mary II to the throne during the Glorious Revolution.

The English Civil War then had its impact on the law of bail. King Charles I imprisoned five landowners without charge (Five Knights' Case), exploiting a loophole in the Statute of Westminster 1275 that required the recital of a formal charge to arrange bail. The knights were refused release under the habeas corpus principles of Magna Carta, as the court found that the prerogative of the king to imprison subjects could not be overridden by the common law. Parliament was unhappy with the substantive legal outcome, but the circumstances around how this precedent was set may also have riled contemporary onlookers. Many historians have suggested that Charles I conspired with the Attorney General Robert Heath to manipulate the outcome so as to bolster his power to raise funds, independent of Parliament, using fear of arbitrary imprisonment.

As a peremptory response, Parliament passed the Petition of Right in 1628. This prohibited a person from being held in custody without being charged, among a range of other limitations it tried to place on royal power. Combatting another loophole in the system, the Habeas Corpus Act 1679 was introduced to stop excessively long delays between custody and bail hearings. The Act makes clear the duty on sheriffs and other law officers to produce prisoners for trial hastily.

Sheriff, &c. within Three Days after Service of Habeas Corpus, with the Exception of Treason and Felony, as and under the Regulations herein mentioned, to bring up the Body before the Court to which the Writ is returnable; and certify the true Causes of Imprisonment.

The Bill of Rights 1689, made law at the accession of William of Orange and Mary II to the British throne, later introduced a principle of proportionality to bail by stating that "excessive bail ought not be required". This appears to have been the precursor of the Eighth Amendment to the United States Constitution.

==== Bail in the Victorian era ====
The last major shift in bail legislation before the modern system was the Bail Act 1898. This allowed for justices of the peace to dispense with sureties in situations where they judged that requiring payments for bail would inhibit the course of justice, largely because this meant that many poorer criminals would languish in jail for petty crimes just because they could not afford bail. The Act appears to have had significant effect, despite contemporary criticism in Parliament, as the number of people released on bail before trial had increased to 25% by 1904.

Debates around the nature and application of bail remained, and are still, contentious. In 1963, over half the prisoners remanded to custody instead of being bailed before trial were ultimately not given a custodial sentence after conviction. This led to significant questions being asked about the quality of the English bail process at that time. Nonetheless, it appears that by the 1960s the 1898 Act had achieved its goal, as Home Office research found that the number of prisoners in custody due to a lack of funds for bail was very low.

==== Bail in modern England and Wales ====
In the modern English bail system monetary payments play a very small role. Securities and sureties can be taken as conditions for being granted bail, but these amounts are not excessive. Wider restrictions such as curfews, electronic monitoring, presenting at a police station, and limits on meeting specific people or going to specific places are more common conditions.

The Bail Act 1976 was enacted with the aims of creating more conditions by which defendants could be denied bail and also redefining the parameters of fulfilling bail. The 1976 Act also nullified the recognizance system, removing the requirement of paying a specific amount of money and instead arresting defendants for failing to surrender.

== England and Wales ==
The main legislation relating to modern English bail are the Bail Act 1976 and the Police and Criminal Evidence Act 1984 (PACE). Both Acts have been heavily amended by more recent legislation. Their division represents the major distinction in bail: bail issued by the police (or other law enforcement agencies) before charge and bail issued by a court after charge. PACE bail is subject to the standards set in s3, 3A, 5 and 5A of the Bail Act 1976. The qualified right to bail established by s4 Bail Act 1976 is subject both to exceptions and exclusions discussed below.

=== Right to bail ===
The Bail Act 1976 created a qualified right to be granted bail before conviction, except for when certain factors apply. This does not guarantee a person will get bail, but it places the onus on the prosecution to demonstrate why bail should be refused in preference to custody:

General right to bail of accused persons and others.

- (1) A person to whom this section applies shall be granted bail except as provided in Schedule 1 to this Act.
- (2) This section applies to a person who is accused of an offence when—
  - (a) he appears or is brought before a magistrates' court or the Crown Court in the course of or in connection with proceedings for the offence, or
  - (b) he applies to a court for bail or for a variation of the conditions of bail in connection with the proceedings.

Section 4 is not explicitly incorporated into the provisions affecting police bail; however, the individual parts of PACE, notably ss. 34 and 37, incorporate the principle in substance if not form.

There are two types of bail: conditional and unconditional. Unconditional bail means that the only requirement attached to the bail is to attend a court at a specified date and time. Conditional bail will attach further requirements to a person's bail designed to reduce their likelihood of committing further crimes, interfering with an investigation or absconding. This may be done by the police or a court. Police bail is more limited than court-imposed bail.

Failure to meet bail conditions, including the requirement to attend court which applies in 'unconditional bail' cases, may result in a warrant being issued by the court for the bailee's arrest.

=== Exceptions to the right to bail ===
The modern law retains some of the historic exceptions to the right to bail.

Section 25(2) of the Criminal Justice and Public Order Act 1994 establishes that the right to bail is excluded in cases of murder, attempted murder, rape and certain sexual offences where the defendant has already been convicted of one or more of those offences. Bail may still be granted in these cases, but only in exceptional circumstances. This is as opposed to most offences, where there is a presumption that bail will apply unless there are particular reasons not to grant it as specified in the legislation. In some cases drug related offending, by a person who has previously failed to engage with a drug testing regime, will also fall under the exclusion of the right to bail.

=== Police bail ===
The rank insignia of a police inspector, the minimum officer rank necessary to approve police bail.

The police may offer bail in two different circumstances: where there is not enough evidence to charge a suspect (pre-charge bail) or once a suspect has been charged (post-charge bail).

==== Deciding on pre-charge bail ====
As a requirement of PACE, a custody officer has the authority to release a person who has not been charged on bail. This is deemed to be a release on bail in accordance with sections 3, 3A, 5 and 5A of the Bail Act 1976. Police bail is for an initial period of 3 months. This can be extended by an inspector by an additional three months (to a total of 6 months), and again by a superintendent for an additional three months (to a total of 9 months). Cases designated "exceptionally complex" by the Director of Public Prosecutions may instead be extended up to 12 months once; and longer periods apply to cases investigated by the FCA, HMRC, the NCA, or the SFO, which trend to take longer to investigate due to their complexity. Further extensions may be granted by a magistrates' court.

Police bail may be subject to conditions for the following purposes:

- to secure that the person surrenders to custody,
- to secure that the person does not commit an offence while on bail,
- to secure that the person does not interfere with witnesses or otherwise obstruct the course of justice, whether in relation to themself or any other person, or
- for the person's own protection or, if the person is under the age of 18, for the person's own welfare or in the person's own interests.

However, they may not require a recognizance, surety or security (i.e. money either paid on release or promised, perhaps by a third party, in the event of breaching the other conditions or absconding), or require residence in a bail hostel.

==== Breach of police bail ====
Breaching police imposed bail conditions is not a criminal offence in itself. However, the police have the authority to arrest any person in breach of their conditions then charge or re-bail them. There is no power to alter bail conditions at this point. Further, breaches of police bail will likely influence any later decisions made in court about a person's bail.

=== 2017–2022: Release under investigation ===
The Policing and Crime Act 2017 made a number of amendments to PACE, one of which was to introduce an approach to police bail that applies bail only under specific circumstances. A result of this was that there was a presumption that a person would be released from police custody with no restrictions on their freedom. This was commonly referred to as release under investigation or RUI. A number of issues were identified with the RUI process. The most prominent is that it lacks a statutory framework and therefore does not incorporate the specific time limits which would apply to a person were they released on bail. This meant some people were left without knowledge of how their case was progressing and with no timeframe for being told if they are either no longer being investigated, or being charged. There were also cases where a person released under investigation, and so not subject to police monitoring, went on to commit further offences against the same victim. As a result, further amendments made by the Police, Crime, Sentencing and Courts Act 2022 require bail where further investigation is needed or further proceedings against the person (such as charges) may be made.

=== Magistrates' court ===
A Magistrates' or Crown Court is the most typical location for granting or varying bail in England and Wales. Which court grants bail will depend, among other things, on the nature of the offences being tried, the factual complexity of the situation underlying those offences, and the history of the defendant. A Magistrates' Court is the lowest court in the English and Welsh legal system. There is no jury and hearings may be taken by a panel of three non-specialist volunteers called magistrates. In more complex cases a district judge (often referred to as DJ, who may be a lawyer sitting part time) may be present.

Magistrates hear trials of lower level crimes which are designated as summary (only suitable for Magistrates' Court) or either-way (offences which may be heard in the Magistrates' or Crown Court depending on context). In the latter case a defendant may decide whether they wish to be tried summarily by a Magistrates' Court or by a jury in the Crown Court (this is known as 'electing jury trial'). However, the magistrates may consider likely sentence would be in excess of their powers and so require either the trial, or sentence alone, be heard before the Crown Court. Magistrates’ courts also deal with the initial stage of all Indictable offences and make an initial decision on bail before either-way or indictable cases are transferred to the Crown Court.

==== Applying for bail ====
An application for bail (i.e. to be released rather than remanded in custody) is an inquisitorial process, and the bench must be satisfied there is enough relevant information available to make an adequate decision before it acts. The prosecution and defence will both make submissions on whether bail is suitable – in some cases the prosecution may agree not to oppose bail, but the decision ultimately remains one for the magistrates to make. The decision will take place in two parts. First, whether bail should or should not be granted, and second, whether any conditions should be imposed.

When deciding whether to grant bail, the court will consider if the right to bail applies, whether there are any statutory exceptions to bail relevant to the case and whether there is a real prospect of the defendant going to custody if convicted. Where the court grants bail or creates or varies conditions of bail it must give its reasons for doing so.

Once a decision has been made to grant bail, the court will consider the appropriate conditions to impose. This decision is made from a starting point that assumes a right to have bail without conditions. Conditions can be added if and only if they are necessary for a specific purpose.

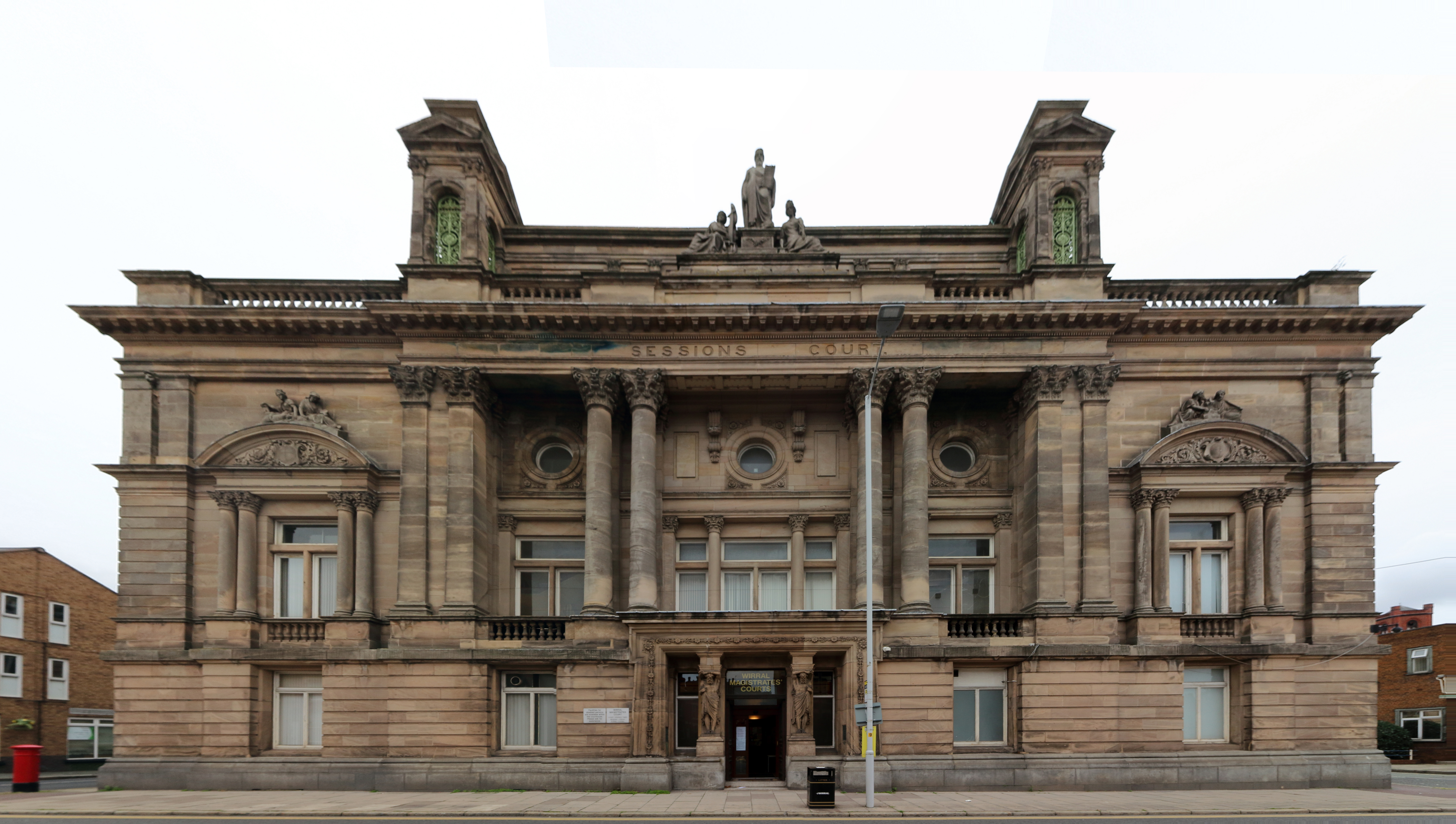
Wirral Magistrates' Court, Birkenhead

The purposes of conditions can be:

- To ensure attendance at court.
- To prevent offending while on bail.
- To prevent interference with witnesses or obstruction of the course of justice.
- For the defendant's own protection.
- To ensure the defendant is available to assist with enquiries or preparation of reports.
- To ensure the defendant attends an appointment with their legal representative before the next hearing.

'Necessary' for these purposes is specifically defined. In this context, it means that the condition relates to a genuine (not fanciful) risk posed by the defendant, is specific and justifiable, enforceable, and effective.

Bail may also be withheld where certain exceptions apply. Schedule 1 Bail Act 1976 sets out a number of exceptions to granting bail. Exactly which exceptions from schedule 1 apply will depend on the type of offence being tried and the factual context including the defendant's previous offending, mental health, drug tests, and whether the court has been able to find substantial enough information to make an adequate bail decision. The Schedule 1 provisions apply in both the Crown court and magistrates' court, but vary based on the type of offence.

==== Appealing a bail decision ====
Defendants may appeal the bail decision under section 81 of the Senior Courts Act 1981. The appeal is a complete re-hearing of the arguments. It will usually take place within 48 hours of the initial decision. The procedure is governed by Criminal Procedure Rule 14.8.

Where a defendant is charged with an imprisonable offence (and in some other limited situations) the prosecution can appeal a bail decision. They must notify the court they are appealing by saying so in court at the time bail is granted and following up in writing within two hours, as required by the Criminal Procedure Rules 14.9. Where this happens, the defendant will be placed in custody until the appeal hearing has taken place.

=== Crown court ===
The Crown court will consider bail whenever there is a material change in the circumstances of the defendant and on any instance the defendant's case comes before the court. Therefore, specific bail applications do not need to be made for the court to consider bail. The defendant does not have an unqualified right to appear in bail applications; it may be that the court considers bail in circumstances where the defendant is not present if this does not cause injustice.

The approach to deciding on bail will be largely the same as that taken by the Magistrates' court and described above; both conditional and unconditional bail can be granted by the court. The court must also give reasons whenever it refuses bail or alters bail conditions as set out in Criminal Procedure Rule 14.2 and where the CPS does not oppose bail, the court may still impose it.

==== Making repeated bail applications ====
Under Schedule 1 of the Bail Act 1976, defendants have a right to make a second bail application for any reason and to have a full rehearing. Despite this, the second hearing does not have to reconsider points of fact or law that were already made in the first application. As a result, second hearings will not be available without a "material change of circumstances" having taken place. The Law Commission have suggested that the passing of significant time may, by itself, amount to a material change of circumstances.

==== Failing to surrender ====
Not appearing at court as required by a person's bail is known as failure to surrender to bail. This is a summary criminal offence with a maximum sentence of three months' imprisonment. The offence might also be dealt with as contempt of court, which could lead to a maximum sentence of 12 months' imprisonment.

=== High Court, Court of Appeal and Supreme Court ===
Appeals in criminal cases can be made, in the correct circumstances, to the High Court by way of case stated. Appeals by way of case stated are appeals that focus on legal matters (rather than facts). In these circumstances, the High Court may grant bail in cases originally heard in the magistrates' court.

An appeal can also be achieved by judicial review of the decision at Crown court level. While the High Court may have jurisdiction to review Crown court bail conditions in certain circumstances, the court will use this power sparingly. For a judicial review to be successful, the decision of the Crown court must be found to be unreasonable to the level set by the public law principle of Wednesbury unreasonableness.

Where an appeal is being made to the Court of Appeal, bail can be granted by a judge from the lower court who certified the case for appeal, or by a Lord or Lady Justice of Appeal sitting alone, or the full court.

The Supreme Court does not grant bail.

=== Immigration bail ===
Immigration bail is a form of bail granted to individuals in immigration detention. It is typically issued while a decision on immigration status or deportation is pending, though it may still be issued even where a person can no longer be lawfully detained. The system is distinct from bail for criminal offences, though common factors such as previous convictions and the risk of offending are considered.

Immigration bail applies to individuals liable for detention by the Secretary of State, usually the Home Secretary, for an immigration offence. It applies when a person is, or is liable to be, detained under the following provisions:

- Detention for examination or removal – Paragraph 16(1), (1A) or (2) of Schedule 2 to the Immigration Act 1971
- Detention for deportation – Paragraph 2(1), (2) or (3) of Schedule 3 to the Immigration Act 1971
- Detention by Secretary of State for examination or removal – Section 62 of the Nationality, Immigration and Asylum Act 2002
- Detention prior to automatic deportation – Section 36(1) of the UK Borders Act 2007

==== Power to grant bail ====
The authority to grant bail rests with the Secretary of State, usually the Home Secretary, and is typically exercised by officials acting on their behalf such as immigration or Border Force officers.

A person may apply for bail, or it may be granted at the discretion of officials, the Home Secretary or the Immigration Tribunal.

In deciding whether to grant bail, the relevant factors to be considered include: whether the person can realistically comply with a bail condition, any previous convictions, likelihood of further offences being committed on bail, likelihood of a person's presence causing a risk to public health or public order, whether detention is necessary for the protection of others, and whether the person has failed to cooperate with the immigration process without a reasonable excuse.

The bail period is indefinite, lasting until further action is taken regarding the individual’s immigration status. This typically includes being granted leave to remain, removal (deportation), or meeting one of the detention criteria. In cases of bail relating to paragraph 16(1) of Schedule 2 of the Immigration Act 1971, the Immigration Tribunal are limited to granting bail on the ninth day or beyond that a person is present in the United Kingdom. This does not apply to paragraph 16(1A) cases. The tribunal are also prohibited from granting bail where a person is in detention and there are directions on behalf of the Home Secretary that the person is to be deported within 14 days or fewer. Both these limits on the tribunal are established by paragraph 3 of Schedule 10 of the Immigration Act 2016.

A person may make repeated applications to the Immigration Tribunal for bail. However, paragraph 12(2) of Schedule 10 of the Immigration Act 2016 requires that the tribunal must refuse to hear a repeated application unless it has been more than 28 days since the last application, or the applicant can demonstrate a material change in circumstances.

==== Automatic referral for bail ====
Where a person is detained under paragraph 16(1), (1A) or (2) of Schedule 2 of the Immigration Act 1971 or s. 62 Nationality, Immigration and Asylum Act 2002, the government must refer them to the tribunal for a bail decision within four months of the start of detention, and each subsequent four-month period. Where a person submits their own application, the four-month period is calculated from the date of the most recent application. This does not apply for certain detention provisions, people detained for national security reasons, or where a person has given and not withdrawn written notice that they do not want to be referred.

==== Bail conditions ====
Immigration bail is always conditional. If a financial condition, such as a security or surety, is imposed, at least one other condition from the Home Office’s list must also be included:

- a condition requiring the person to appear before the Secretary of State or the First-tier Tribunal at a specified time and place
- a condition restricting the person's work, occupation or studies in the UK
- a condition about the person's residence
- a condition requiring the person to report to the Secretary of State or other person specified
- an electronic monitoring condition
- such other condition as the person granting the immigration bail sees fit (for example: curfew; requirement to notify the Home Office of change in circumstances)

A condition may be imposed if officials or the Immigration Tribunal are satisfied that the person can comply with it from the start of the bail period.

== Northern Ireland ==
The Northern Irish bail system overlaps significantly with the system in place in England and Wales, notably, it mirrors many of the Police and Criminal Evidence Act (PACE) 1984 provisions for police bail in the related Irish legislation: The Police and Criminal Evidence (Northern Ireland) Order 1989 (PACE NI). Further legislation which provides the basis for bail law in Northern Ireland is:

- The Criminal Justice (Northern Ireland) Order 2003
- The Magistrates' Courts (Northern Ireland) Order 1981

However, the Northern Irish system has a less comprehensive statutory framework setting out the fundamental principles of bail than in England and Wales, instead relying heavily on common law. For example, there is no statutory right to bail in Northern Irish legislation as there is in the Bail Act 1976 - though the principle is enshrined in the common law and supported by the European Court of Human Rights (ECtHR) grounds for objection to bail.

=== Fundamentals of Northern Irish Bail ===
Northern Irish common law provides that bail will be granted to any person unless the prosecution can prove that one of the four ECtHR objections to bail apply. The four objections are:

- The defendant will fail to appear for trial.
- The defendant will interfere in the course of justice.
- The defendant will commit further offences.
- The defendant will pose a risk to the preservation of public order.

These are the only formal objections to bail available to the prosecution. However, a de facto fifth objection is created by PACE NI as, under s39(1)(a)(iv) of the order, a police custody officer may decline to release an accused from detention after charge if they consider it necessary for the accused’s protection.

In sharp contrast to bail in England and Wales, whenever a person is released on bail by a court in Northern Ireland they must always pay a recognizance. That is, a payment which a person on bail will forfeit if they fail to attend a court as ordered. Any bail conditions may be imposed in addition to the recognizance. This is distinct from police bail situations, where a recognizance or surety may be taken but is not required in every case.

=== Police Bail, Northern Ireland ===
Under the provisions of PACE NI, police officers can detain suspects for a standard period of 24 hours (increasable to 36 hours with the permission of superintendent). Detention is permitted where a custody officer deems it necessary to secure or preserve evidence, or to question the suspect. Once this period of time elapses or when there is no need to detain the suspect for those reasons, the suspect will be released with or without bail.

Where a suspect is released on bail, either with or without charge, they may have conditions imposed on them if those conditions are required to make sure the suspect:

- Surrenders to custody
- Does not commit further offences
- Does not interfere with witnesses
- Does not obstruct the course of justice

Where bail is not granted for the above reasons, a person must either be held in custody for a legitimate reason or released without bail (i.e.released without restrictions).

==== Police Bail After Charge ====
If a suspect has been charged they must be released with or without bail, assessed on the principles set out above, unless one or more of the following conditions apply:

In all cases:

- The suspect’s name or address cannot be found out or the custody officer has reasonable grounds for doubting whether a name or address furnished by him as his name or address is true
- The custody officer has reasonable grounds for believing that the detention of the person arrested is necessary to prevent physical injury to any other person or loss of or damage to property
- The custody officer has reasonable grounds for believing that the person arrested will fail to appear in court to answer to bail or that detention is necessary to prevent him from interfering with the administration of justice or with the investigation of offences
- The custody officer has reasonable grounds for believing that the detention of the person arrested is necessary for his own protection

Where the offence may carry a prison sentence:

- All the above, and
- Where the custody officer has reasonable grounds for believing that the detention of the person arrested is necessary to prevent the suspect from committing an offence

if any of the above conditions apply a suspect can continue to be detained in custody by the police after charge.

== See also ==
- English criminal law
- Powers of the police in England and Wales
- Courts of England and Wales
- Courts of Scotland
- Courts of Northern Ireland
