= Victoria Aitken =

British former fashion model (born 1965)

- Born: Catherine Victoria Lockwood; 20 April 1965 (age 61); Windsor, England
- Other name: Victoria Spencer
- Occupation: Model
- Spouses: Charles Spencer, 9th Earl Spencer (m. 1989; div. 1997) Jonathan Aitken (m. 2005; div. 2009)
- Children: 5, including Lady Kitty Spencer, Lady Amelia Spencer, Lady Eliza Spencer, and Louis, Viscount Althorp

Catherine Victoria Aitken (née Lockwood; born 20 April 1965), formerly Victoria Spencer, Countess Spencer, is a British former fashion model and addiction counsellor, also known for being the first wife of Charles Spencer, 9th Earl Spencer, the younger brother of Diana, Princess of Wales.

== Family ==
Catherine Victoria Lockwood was born in Windsor, the only daughter of John Ernest Lockwood (deceased in 2010), an airline executive, and Jean Lockwood, née Holt. Her brother Christopher Lockwood is a journalist and was Deputy Head of the Number 10 Policy Unit from May 2013 to May 2015. In London, her family lived on The Terrace in Barnes.

== Modelling career ==
Victoria Lockwood began to model at age 19 after being discovered by American photographer Bruce Weber, who also photographed her for her first fashion feature in Tatler in October 1984.

According to Bellazon.com, one of the largest online fashion communities, she initially worked with Premier Models in London before moving to Click Models in New York City and FAM Models in Paris. In addition to Tatler, she was pictured in well-known magazines such as British Vogue, American Vogue, Vogue Italia, Marie Claire, Elle Japan, and Harper’s Bazaar, among others.

During her youth, she struggled with eating disorders and substance dependence but gave up drugs, including heroin, before her first marriage in 1989.

== First marriage ==
On 16 September 1989, after a six-week courtship, she married Charles Spencer, then Viscount Althorp, at the Church of St. Mary the Virgin, Great Brington. The ceremony was conducted by the local vicar, Rev. Norman Knibbs, and the then Archbishop of Canterbury, Robert Runcie, met the bride in the doorway of the church.

Her engagement ring was made up of ruby and diamond topped with a crown, similar to one ring that belonged to Queen Victoria, while her wedding dress of champagne French antique lace with Russian sable trim was designed by Tomasz Starzewski. She wore the Spencer Tiara. Althorp's nephews Prince Harry and Alexander Fellowes were the pageboys at their wedding and his nieces Eleanor Fellowes and Emily McCorquodale were bridesmaids.

During their marriage, she was known as Viscountess Althorp and later, with the death of her father-in-law in March 1992, as Countess Spencer. They had four children:

- Lady Kitty Eleanor Spencer (born 28 December 1990); married Michael Lewis in 2021. They have one daughter, Athena.
- Lady Eliza Victoria Spencer (born 10 July 1992), a model
- Lady Katya Amelia Spencer (born 10 July 1992); a model; married Greg Mallett, nephew of former South African national rugby coach Nick Mallett, in 2023.
- Louis Frederick John Spencer, Viscount Althorp (born 14 March 1994); heir apparent to the earldom.

The family lived at The Falconry, a historic building built in 1613 on the Althorp Estate, until Charles Spencer inherited the earldom and the estate from his father.

== Struggles with anorexia and substance abuse ==
From early in the marriage, her husband was involved in extramarital relationships, while Victoria experienced ongoing struggles with anorexia and substance addiction. Just sixteen months after the wedding, her husband admitted to the press that he had had an affair with a journalist early on, when the viscountess was pregnant for the first time. In the spring of 1994, after the birth of their last child, her husband met a married South African socialite with whom he began an affair that lasted two years and five months, ending in December 1996.

In April 1995, Countess Spencer was photographed by tabloid newspapers while walking in the grounds of a private clinic in Surrey, where she spent five months receiving treatment for addiction issues, reportedly including alcoholism, as well as eating disorders. Later that month, a spokesman for the Earl confirmed that the couple would be living separately, although there were no plans for divorce at that time.

In September 1995, the Earl and Countess Spencer filed a lawsuit against the United Kingdom at the European Court of Human Rights (ECHR), claiming that there was no privacy law in the UK to prevent newspapers from reporting on her health issues and intruding into their private lives. In January 1998, the court eventually dismissed their claims, noting that they had not exhausted all available legal avenues under British law before bringing the case to Europe.

== Move to South Africa ==
Just before Christmas in 1995, the already estranged Spencers moved with their four children to Cape Town, South Africa, to avoid media attention. They both settled in the suburb of Constantia, where Countess Spencer lived with the children at Silverhurst Estate, a gated community, and Lord Spencer resided in the nearby Tarrystone House, which he purchased in 1996.

== Divorce ==
After the family relocation, Lord Spencer filed for divorce in South Africa, as both parties were living there, while the Countess wanted the case to be heard in Britain. This led to a legal battle over the proper jurisdiction, which was eventually resolved when Countess Spencer, represented by Jeremy Gauntlett, agreed to have the divorce finalized in South Africa to spare her children public scrutiny and avoid a prolonged process.

During the divorce proceedings, the Countess did not attend her former sister-in-law Diana's funeral in September 1997, as she continued her recovery treatment and stayed with her children in Cape Town, where she began a four-year relationship with a local pharmacist. At the burial, Lord Spencer was accompanied with his then-new girlfriend, a South African model, whom Victoria herself had introduced to him; their relationship lasted nine months.

On 3 December 1997, after a highly publicized case, the Cape Town High Court granted the Spencers’ divorce through a settlement that awarded her a lump sum of £1.815 million, as well as her car and her house in Cape Town with its contents. The couple had joint custody of the children. Later in October 1998, she sued her former lawyers for delaying the filing of the divorce petition in England before her departure from the country, resulting in a smaller settlement in South Africa.

After their divorce, Lord Spencer moved back to the United Kingdom, and subsequently remarried.

== Second marriage ==
In 2001, through mutual friends, Victoria Spencer met and started dating South African businessman Jonathan Aitken, a former model who then ran an international clothing company. The next year, they were expecting their only child, Samuel Aitken (born 18 April 2003), who is a model. About the birth of her fifth child, she told Hello! that there was no pressure that time, as she was not providing a much awaited son and heir.

They married in a civil ceremony in January 2005, in the garden of her house in Cape Town. Her four children by Lord Spencer served as bridesmaids and pageboy. She changed her name to Victoria Aitken. They divorced in 2009.

== Counselling work ==
In October 1998, having recovered from her addictions and trained as a counsellor, Victoria Spencer co-opened The Stepping Stones treatment centre on Main Road in Kommetjie. In her opening speech, she described herself as an “alcoholic and anorexic” who had been given “the precious gift of recovery” and stated that "there was no cause closer to her heart than the treatment of addiction", expressing gratitude to her counsellor and senior specialist, Carry Bekker, who had supported her throughout her journey.

Today the clinic in Kommetjie is known as Akeso Stepping Stones, being part of Netcare Group Limited.
