= Karen Spencer, Countess Spencer =

Canadian social entrepreneur (born 1972)

Karen, Countess Spencer
- Born: Karen Anne Villeneuve; June 6, 1972 (age 54); Edmonton, Alberta, Canada
- Occupation: Social entrepreneur
- Spouses: Mark Gordon (m. 1997; div. 2003); Charles Spencer, 9th Earl Spencer (m. 2011; div. 2025)
- Children: 3

Karen, Countess Spencer (formerly Gordon, née Villeneuve; born June 6, 1972) is a Canadian social entrepreneur. She is the founder of Whole Child International, a U.S.-based non-governmental organization that works to improve the quality of care for vulnerable children. She was the CEO of Whole Child International from 2004 to 2024, at which time she became the chairwoman. She was married to Charles Spencer, 9th Earl Spencer, the younger brother of Diana, Princess of Wales, from 2011 to 2025.

== Life and career ==
Karen Anne Villeneuve was born in Edmonton, Alberta, Canada; her father's career as a National Parks administrator led to frequent relocations, resulting in her family residing in 23 homes and her attending 10 schools during her childhood. Spencer attributes this upbringing as the catalyst for her to found Whole Child International, in 2004, which supports children without stable homes.

Spencer was inspired to address the emotional needs of society's most vulnerable children in 2004, after participating in a parenting class that introduced her to the attachment-based child-rearing approach of Emmi Pikler. Between 2018 and 2023, Whole Child implemented programs with funding from USAID and other donors. Following 20 years as CEO, she is the organization's board chair.

Lady Spencer is co-author of articles published in the peer-reviewed Infant Journal of Mental Health and Perspectives in Infant Mental Health. In September 2015, the Ashoka Foundation elected her an Ashoka Fellow for her social entrepreneurial work identifying and filling a gap in care for orphans and vulnerable children. In 2017, she received the Pikler/Lóczy USA Founders Award, and People magazine named her one of "25 Women Changing the World." In 2018 she was made an honorary fellow at the University of Northampton in the United Kingdom.

In 2019, she helped co-found Catalyst 2030 (later Catalyst Now), an organization focused on empowering the broader community of social entrepreneurs. She is a member of the Center for Global Development board of directors. In 2025, she became a governing council co-chair of Catalyst Now.

== Marriages and children ==
She married Mark Gordon, a Hollywood producer whose films and TV series include Saving Private Ryan, Speed, Grey's Anatomy, and Criminal Minds, on November 8, 1997 and divorced in 2003. Their daughter Emma was born in 1998 and their daughter Kate was born in 2001.

On June 25, 2011, she married Charles Spencer, 9th Earl Spencer at Althorp. The Earl Spencer, brother of the late Diana, Princess of Wales, is an author and broadcaster. As a result of her marriage, she was formally styled The Right Honourable The Countess Spencer, and was addressed as Lady Spencer. The Earl and Countess Spencer have one daughter together: Lady Charlotte Diana Spencer, born July 30, 2012 at Althorp and named in honour of her late aunt, Diana, Princess of Wales.

In 2016, Lady Spencer assisted her husband with restoration projects to rejuvenate the estate's historic gardens — the first major transformation in 350 years. A statement on the Althorp website described the project as "ambitious," highlighting her leadership in the extensive redesign of the Oval Lake, where Diana, Princess of Wales is laid to rest. The redesign included extensive landscaping, and revitalized a significant area of the estate's grounds.

In June 2024, it was announced that the Earl and Countess had separated and planned to divorce. It was reported at the same time that the Earl had become the partner to Professor Cat Jarman, with whom he was co-hosting the podcast The Rabbit Hole Detectives. In October of the same year, Jarman sued Lady Spencer for allegedly disclosing her multiple sclerosis diagnosis. Spencer's respondent filings state that Jarman's husband, Tom Jarman, had volunteered the MS information to the Countess, indicating that it was not a secret. The lawsuit was settled in December 2025, via a Part 36 provision, assigning Jarman £4,500 in damages with "no admission of liability or wrongdoing" by Lady Spencer. Earl Spencer was ordered to pay the legal costs, estimated to be in excess of £2 million, in compliance with the financial arrangements of the Spencers' divorce arbitration. Their divorce was finalized in December 2025.
