= List of wedding guests of Prince Harry and Meghan Markle =

The following is the guest list for the wedding of Prince Harry and Meghan Markle, which took place on 19 May 2018, at St George's Chapel, Windsor Castle.

== Relatives of the groom ==
=== House of Windsor ===
- The Queen and the Duke of Edinburgh, the groom's paternal grandparents
  - The Prince of Wales and the Duchess of Cornwall, the groom's father and stepmother
    - The Duke and Duchess of Cambridge, the groom's brother and sister-in-law
      - Prince George of Cambridge, the groom's nephew
      - Princess Charlotte of Cambridge, the groom's niece
  - The Princess Royal and Vice-Admiral Sir Timothy Laurence, the groom's paternal aunt and uncle
    - Peter and Autumn Phillips, the groom's first cousin and his wife
    - Zara and Michael Tindall, the groom's first cousin and her husband
  - The Duke of York and Sarah, Duchess of York, the groom's paternal uncle (godfather) and his ex-wife
    - Princess Beatrice of York, the groom's first cousin
    - Princess Eugenie of York and Jack Brooksbank, the groom's first cousin and her fiancé
  - The Earl and Countess of Wessex, the groom's paternal uncle and aunt
    - Lady Louise Mountbatten-Windsor, the groom's first cousin
    - Viscount Severn, the groom's first cousin
- The Princess Margaret, Countess of Snowdon's family:
  - The Earl and Countess of Snowdon, the groom's first cousin, once removed, and his wife
    - Viscount Linley, the groom's second cousin
    - Lady Margarita Armstrong-Jones, the groom's second cousin
  - Lady Sarah and Daniel Chatto, the groom's first cousin, once removed and godmother and her husband
    - Samuel Chatto, the groom's second cousin
    - Arthur Chatto, the groom's second cousin

Other descendants of the Prince's great-great-grandfather King George V and their families:

- The Duke and Duchess of Gloucester, the groom's first cousin, twice removed, and his wife
- The Duke and Duchess of Kent, the groom's first cousin, twice removed, and his wife
- Princess Alexandra, The Hon. Lady Ogilvy, the groom's first cousin, twice removed
- Prince and Princess Michael of Kent, the groom's first cousin, twice removed and his wife

=== Spencer family ===
- Lady Sarah and Neil McCorquodale, the groom's maternal aunt and uncle
  - Emily McCorquodale, the groom's first cousin
  - George McCorquodale, the groom's first cousin
  - Celia McCorquodale, the groom's first cousin
- The Lady and Lord Fellowes, the groom's maternal aunt and uncle
  - The Hon. Laura Pettman, the groom's first cousin
  - The Hon. Alexander Fellowes, the groom's first cousin
  - The Hon. Eleanor Fellowes, the groom's first cousin
- The Earl and Countess Spencer, the groom's maternal uncle and aunt
  - Lady Kitty Spencer, the groom's first cousin
  - Lady Eliza Spencer, the groom's first cousin
  - Viscount Althorp, the groom's first cousin

=== Bowes-Lyon family ===
- Lady Elizabeth Shakerley, the groom's second cousin, once removed

=== Mountbatten family ===
- Lady Alexandra and Thomas Hooper, the groom's third cousin and her husband

=== Parker Bowles family ===
- Thomas and Sara Parker Bowles, the groom's stepbrother and stepsister-in-law
- Laura and Harry Lopes, the groom's stepsister and stepbrother-in-law
- Benjamin and Mary-Clare Elliot, the groom's stepfirst cousin and his wife

=== Middleton family ===
- Michael and Carole Middleton, parents of the groom's sister-in-law, the Duchess of Cambridge
  - Philippa and James Matthews, sister and brother-in-law of the Duchess of Cambridge
  - James Middleton, brother of the Duchess of Cambridge

== Relatives of the bride ==
- Doria Ragland, the bride's mother

== Foreign royalty ==
=== Members of reigning royal families ===
- Prince Seeiso and Princess Mabereng Seeiso of Lesotho (brother of the King of Lesotho. Both the groom and Prince Seeiso are the founders of the Lesotho-based AIDS charity Sentebale)

=== Members of non-reigning royal families ===
- The Hereditary Prince and Princess of Oettingen-Spielberg

== Politicians ==
- (United Kingdom) Sir John Major and his wife, Dame Norma Major
- (United Kingdom) Sir Nicholas Soames (grandson of Winston Churchill)

== Religious figures ==
- Anba Angaelos, Coptic Orthodox Archbishop of London (offered prayers)
- David Conner, Dean of Windsor
- Michael Curry, Presiding Bishop and Primate of The Episcopal Church (delivered the sermon during the ceremony)
- Rose Hudson-Wilkin, Honorary Chaplain to the Queen (offered prayers)
- Justin Welby, Archbishop of Canterbury

== Friends of Prince Harry and Meghan Markle ==
- Victoria Aitken (former wife of the groom's uncle, the Earl Spencer)
- Markus Anderson (long-time friend of the bride)
- Alessandra Balazs (friend of the couple)
- Carolyn Bartholomew (godmother of the groom and friend of his mother the late Diana, Princess of Wales) and William Bartholomew
- Cressida Bonas (granddaughter of Edward Curzon, 6th Earl Howe, friend and ex-girlfriend of the groom)
- Emilie van Cutsem (widow of the groom's father's friend, Hugh van Cutsem)
  - Major Nicholas van Cutsem (childhood friend of the groom) and Alice van Cutsem (parents of bridesmaid Florence van Cutsem)
- Adrian and Sophie Dandridge (community workers at Botswana's Great Plains Conservation where the couple had their 3rd date)
- Chelsy Davy (friend and ex-girlfriend of the groom) and her brother, Shaun Davy
- Rebecca Deacon (former private secretary to the Duchess of Cambridge) and Adam Priestley
- Heather Dorak (college friend of the bride and pilates instructor) and her husband, Matt Cohen
- Mark Dyer (former equerry to the Prince of Wales) and Amanda Dyer (parents of page boy Jasper Dyer)
- Misan Harriman (photographer and long-time friend of the bride) and his wife, Camilla Holmstroem
- Patrick Harverson (former communications secretary to the Prince of Wales and the Duchess of Cornwall, official spokesman to the Duke and Duchess of Cambridge) and Mel Harverson
- Michael Hess (friend of the groom)
- Ben Murray (cousin of the groom)
- Genevieve Hillis (long-time friend of the bride)
- Tom Inskip (friend of the groom from Eton College; son of Owen Inskip, a friend of the groom's father) and his wife, The Hon. Lara Inskip (daughter of Lord St Helens)
- Daisy Jenks (friend of the groom)
- Lindsay Jordan (long-time friend of the bride) and Gavin Jordan
- Celine Khavarani (long-time friend of the bride)
- Brian Kocinski (long-time friend of the bride)
- Arthur Landon (long-time friend of the groom)
- Katalin Landon (friend of the groom)
- Ed Lane Fox (former private secretary to the groom) and Sonia Lane Fox
- The Hon. Dame Shân Legge-Bourke (mother of the groom's former nanny, Tiggy Pettifer)
  - Zara Gordon-Lennox (younger daughter of Shân Legge-Bourke) and Angus Gordon-Lennox
- Silver Tree (long-time friend of the bride) and her husband, Abraham Levy
- Benita Litt (college friend of the bride) and Darren Litt(parents of bridesmaids Rylan and Remi Litt)
- Alexi Lubomirski (the couple's official engagement photographer) and Giada Lubomirski
- Isabel May (close friend of the bride)
- James Meade (friend of the groom; son of Richard Meade) and Lady Laura Marsham (daughter of the Earl of Romney)
- Lucy Meadmore (long-time friend of the bride)
- Guy Pelly (friend of the groom) and his wife, Lizzie Wilson (heiress to the Holiday Inn empire)
- Tiggy Pettifer (the groom's former nanny, formerly known as Tiggy Legge-Bourke) and Charles Pettifer (former Guards officer)
  - Frederick Pettifer (the groom's godson)
  - Thomas Pettifer
- Julia Samuel (friend of the late Diana, Princess of Wales) and her husband, The Hon. Michael Samuel (son of the Viscount Bearsted)
- Dean and Alana Stott (friends of the groom)
- Alexander and Claire van Straubenzee (family friends of the groom)
  - Charles van Straubenzee (friend of the groom)
  - Thomas van Straubenzee (friend of the groom)
- The Lord Vestey (Master of the Horse to the Royal Household)
  - The Hon. William Vestey and his wife, Violet Henderson (contributing editor to British Vogue)
- Nicholas Walton Collins (friend of the bride and former talent agent) and Amelia Walton Collins
- Amanda Ward (widow of Gerald Ward, the groom's godfather)
- Lady Carolyn Warren (horse racing manager; daughter of the Earl of Carnarvon) and John Warren (the Queen's horse racing adviser)
  - Jake Warren (childhood friend of the groom) and Zoe Warren (parents of bridesmaid Zalie Warren)
- Jessie Webb (former nanny of the groom)
- Violet Von Westenholz
- The Duchess of Westminster (the groom's family friend)
  - Lady Edwina and Daniel Snow (historian and television presenter)
  - The Duke of Westminster
  - Lady Viola Grosvenor

== Famous friends and notable guests ==
- Patrick J. Adams (Suits co-star and friend of the bride) and wife, Troian Bellisario (American actress)
- David Beckham (English former professional football player and friend of the groom) and wife Victoria Beckham (English singer and fashion designer)
- James Blunt (British singer-songwriter and friend of the groom) and wife, Sofia Wellesley (granddaughter of the 8th Duke of Wellington)
- Priyanka Chopra (Indian actress, model and friend of the bride)
- George Clooney (American actor) and wife, Amal Clooney (friends of the couple)
- James Corden (British talk show host and friend of the groom) and wife, Julia Carey (TV producer)
- Idris Elba (British actor and friend of the groom) and fiancée, Sabrina Dhowre
- Nacho Figueras (professional polo player and friend of the groom) and wife, Delfina Blaquier
- Janina Gavankar (American actress and friend of the bride)
- Will Greenwood (former professional rugby player and friend of the groom) and wife, Caroline Greenwood
- Tom Hardy (British actor and friend of the groom) and wife, Charlotte Riley
- James Haskell (former professional rugby player and friend of the groom) and fiancée, Chloe Madeley (British television presenter)
- Rick Hoffman (Suits co-star and friend of the bride)
- Elton John (family friend of the groom) and husband, David Furnish
- Gabriel Macht (Suits co-star and friend of the bride) and wife, Jacinda Barrett
- Carey Mulligan (British actress and friend of the bride) and husband (singer-songwriter and friend of the groom) Marcus Mumford
- Jessica and Ben Mulroney (long-time friends of bride; son and daughter-in-law of former Canadian Prime Minister Brian Mulroney); and parents of page boys Brian and John Mulroney as well as bridesmaid Ivy Mulroney)
- Misha Nonoo (fashion designer and long-time friend of the bride)
- Sarah Rafferty (Suits co-star and friend of the bride) and husband, Aleksanteri Olli-Pekka Seppälä
- Jill Smoller (American sports talent agent and friend of the bride)
- Abigail Spencer (long-time friend of the bride and later Suits co-star)
- Joss Stone (British singer-songwriter and friend of the groom)
- Gina Torres (Suits co-star and friend of the bride)
- Jonny Wilkinson (former professional rugby player and friend of the groom) and wife, Shelley Jenkins
- Serena Williams (professional tennis player and long-time friend of the bride) and husband, Alexis Ohanian (founder of Reddit)
- Oprah Winfrey (American talk-show host)
- Clive Woodward (former professional rugby player and friend of the groom) and wife Lady Woodward

== Wedding attendants ==
=== Best man ===
- Charlie Van Straubenzee - childhood friend of the groom

=== Flower girls and page boys ===
==== Flower girls ====
- Princess Charlotte of Cambridge (aged 3), niece of the groom
- Rylan Litt (aged 7), goddaughter of the bride
- Remi Litt (aged 6), goddaughter of the bride
- Ivy Mulroney (aged 4), goddaughter of the bride
- Florence van Cutsem (aged 3), goddaughter of the groom
- Zalie Warren (aged 2), goddaughter of the groom

==== Page boys ====
- Prince George of Cambridge (aged 4), nephew of the groom
- Brian Mulroney (aged 7), son of the bride's close friend
- John Mulroney (aged 7), son of the bride's close friend
- Jasper Dyer (aged 6), godson of the groom

== Charities and Members of the Public invited to the Wedding ==
Along with friends, family and relations of the bride and groom, the couple invited 2,000 members of the public to the grounds of the Windsor wedding. This included 500 members of the Royal Household, 1,200 inspiring citizens and young people (chosen by Lord Lieutenants up and down the country), 200 guests from charity organisations the couple have a close association with and 100 local school children.

=== Charity organisations ===
- Well Child
- Sentebale
- One Young World
- Myna Mahlia Foundation
- Invictus Games Foundation

=== Regions of Invitees of the Lord Lieutenants and the couple ===
- Northern Ireland
- West Midlands
- East Midlands and East England
- South West
- South East
- North East and Yorkshire
- North West
- Scotland
- Wales

== See also ==
- List of wedding guests of Prince Charles and Lady Diana Spencer (1981)
- List of wedding guests of Prince William and Catherine Middleton (2011)
