= List of wedding guests of Prince William and Catherine Middleton =

The guest list of the wedding of Prince William and Catherine Middleton was approximately 1,900 people long and included both friends and family members of the couple and official dignitaries in various capacities. The list, which was sent out 16 and 17 February in the name of the Queen, was divided into three sections: the first, consisting of about 1,900 people, attended the ceremony in Westminster Abbey; the second of approximately 600 people were invited to the luncheon reception at Buckingham Palace, hosted by the Queen; and the final 300 names for the evening dinner hosted by the Prince of Wales.

More than half of wedding guests itself were family and friends of the couple, though there were a significant number of Commonwealth leaders (including the governors-general who represent the Queen in Commonwealth realms other than the UK, prime ministers of the Commonwealth realms, and heads of government of other Commonwealth countries), members of religious organisations, the diplomatic corps, several military officials, members of the British Royal Household, members of foreign royal families, and representatives of William's charities and others with whom William has worked on official business. Although St James's Palace declined to publish the names of those invited, a breakdown of guests was published by category; the list made no mention of foreign heads of state.

== Relatives of the groom ==
=== House of Windsor ===
- The Queen and the Duke of Edinburgh, the groom's paternal grandparents
  - The Prince of Wales and the Duchess of Cornwall, the groom's father and stepmother
    - Prince Henry of Wales, the groom's brother
  - The Princess Royal and Vice-Admiral Timothy Laurence, the groom's paternal aunt and uncle
    - Peter and Autumn Phillips, the groom's first cousin and his wife
    - Zara Phillips and Michael Tindall, the groom's first cousin and her fiancé
  - The Duke of York, the groom's paternal uncle
    - Princess Beatrice of York, the groom's first cousin
    - Princess Eugenie of York, the groom's first cousin
  - The Earl and Countess of Wessex, the groom's paternal uncle and aunt
    - Lady Louise Mountbatten-Windsor, the groom's first cousin
- The Princess Margaret, Countess of Snowdon's family:
  - Viscount and Viscountess Linley, the groom's first cousin, once removed, and his wife
    - The Hon. Charles Armstrong-Jones, the groom's second cousin
    - The Hon. Margarita Armstrong-Jones, the groom's second cousin
  - Lady Sarah and Daniel Chatto, the groom's first cousin, once removed, and her husband
    - Samuel Chatto, the groom's second cousin
    - Arthur Chatto, the groom's second cousin

Other descendants of the Prince's great-great-grandfather King George V and their families:

- The Duke and Duchess of Gloucester, the groom's first cousin, twice removed and his wife
  - Earl and Countess of Ulster, the groom's second cousin, once removed, and his wife
  - Lady Davina and Gary Lewis, the groom's second cousin, once removed, and her husband
  - Lady Rose and George Gilman, the groom's second cousin, once removed, and her husband
- The Duke and Duchess of Kent, the groom's first cousin, twice removed and his wife
  - Earl and Countess of St Andrews, the groom's second cousin, once removed, and his wife
    - Lord Downpatrick, the groom's third cousin
    - Lady Marina Windsor, the groom's third cousin
    - Lady Amelia Windsor, the groom's third cousin
  - Lady Helen and Timothy Taylor, the groom's second cousin, once removed, and her husband
  - Lord and Lady Nicholas Windsor, the groom's second cousin, once removed, and his wife
- Princess Alexandra, The Hon. Lady Ogilvy, the groom's godmother and first cousin, twice removed
  - James and Julia Ogilvy, the groom's second cousin, once removed, and his wife
  - Marina Ogilvy, the groom's second cousin, once removed
- Prince and Princess Michael of Kent, the groom's first cousin, twice removed and his wife
  - Lord and Lady Frederick Windsor, the groom's second cousin, once removed, and his wife
  - Lady Gabriella Windsor, the groom's second cousin, once removed

=== Other descendants of Queen Victoria ===
Other descendants of the prince's great-great-great-great-grandmother Queen Victoria and their families. As is common in royalty, there has been slight intermingling of families. Where possible, the closest family ties have been noted (first cousin on grandfather's side, instead of third cousin on grandmother's side, etc.):

- The Queen of Denmark, the groom's third cousin, once removed
- The Crown Princess of Sweden and the Duke of Västergötland, the groom's fourth cousin, once removed, and her husband (representing the King of Sweden)
- The King and Queen of Norway the groom's second cousin, twice removed and his wife
- The Queen of Spain the groom's second cousin, once removed (representing the King of Spain)
  - (Spain) The Prince and Princess of Asturias the groom's third cousin and his wife
- (Grand Duchy of Baden) The Margrave and Margravine of Baden, the groom's first cousin once removed, and his wife
  - (Grand Duchy of Baden) Princess Margarita of Baden, the groom's first cousin, once removed
- (Kingdom of Greece) King Constantine II and Queen Anne-Marie of Greece, the groom's second cousin, once removed (and godfather), and third cousin, once removed
  - (Kingdom of Greece) Crown Prince Pavlos and Crown Princess Marie-Chantal of Greece, the groom's third cousin and his wife
    - (Kingdom of Greece) Prince Constantine Alexios of Greece and Denmark, the groom's third cousin, once removed (and godson)
- (Kingdom of Romania) King Michael I of Romania, the groom's second cousin, once removed
  - Crown Princess Margarita the groom's third cousin
- (Kingdom of Yugoslavia) Crown Prince Alexander and Crown Princess Katherine of Yugoslavia, the groom's third cousin and his wife
- The Landgrave of Hesse the groom's third cousin, twice removed
- Prince and Princess Karl of Hesse, the groom's first cousin, once removed, and his wife
  - Princess Irina, Countess of Schönburg-Glauchau, the groom's second cousin
- The Prince and Princess of Hohenlohe-Langenburg, the groom's second cousin
- Princess Xenia of Hohenlohe-Langenburg and Mr Max Soltmann, the groom's second cousin and her husband
- The Lady Saltoun, widow of the groom's second cousin, thrice removed
- The Countess Mountbatten of Burma, the groom's first cousin, twice removed
  - The Lord Brabourne, the groom's second cousin, once removed (and godfather)
- Lady Pamela Hicks, the groom's first cousin, twice removed

=== Bowes-Lyon family ===
- The Dowager Countess of Strathmore and Kinghorne, widow of the groom's first cousin twice removed
- The Hon. Margaret Rhodes, the groom's first cousin twice removed
- Lady Elizabeth Shakerley, the groom's second cousin once removed (step daughter of the groom's second cousin, twice removed)

=== Spencer family ===
- Lady Sarah and Neil McCorquodale, the groom's maternal aunt and uncle
  - Emily McCorquodale, the groom's first cousin
  - George McCorquodale, the groom's first cousin
  - Celia McCorquodale, the groom's first cousin
- The Lady and Lord Fellowes, the groom's maternal aunt and uncle
  - The Hon. Laura Pettman, the groom's first cousin
  - The Hon. Alexander Fellowes, the groom's first cousin
  - The Hon. Eleanor Fellowes, the groom's first cousin
- The Earl Spencer and Karen Gordon, the groom's maternal uncle and his fiancée
  - Lady Kitty Spencer, the groom's first cousin
  - Lady Eliza Spencer, the groom's first cousin
  - Lady Amelia Spencer, the groom's first cousin
  - Viscount Althorp, the groom's first cousin
- Lady Anne Wake-Walker, the groom's maternal great-aunt
  - Mr and Mrs Anthony Duckworth-Chad, the groom's first cousin, once removed, and her husband
    - Davina Duckworth-Chad and Tom Barber, the groom's second cousin and her husband

=== Roche family ===
- The Hon. Mary Roche, the groom's maternal great-aunt
- The Lord and Lady Fermoy, the groom's first cousin, once removed, and his wife

=== Parker Bowles family ===
- Brigadier Andrew Parker Bowles, father of the groom's stepbrother and stepsister
  - Thomas and Sara Parker Bowles, the groom's stepbrother and stepsister-in-law
  - Laura and Harry Lopes, the groom's stepsister and stepbrother-in-law
- Annabel and Simon Elliot, the groom's stepaunt and stepuncle
  - Benjamin and Mary-Clare Elliot, the groom's step-first cousin and his wife
- Mark Shand, the groom's stepuncle
  - Ayesha Shand, the groom's step-first cousin

== Relatives of the bride ==
- Michael and Carole Middleton, the bride's parents
  - Philippa Middleton and Alexander Loudon, the bride's sister and her guest
  - James Middleton, the bride's brother
- Gary and Luan Goldsmith, the bride's maternal uncle and his ex-wife
  - Tallulah Goldsmith, the bride's first cousin
- Richard Middleton, the bride's paternal uncle
  - Adam Middleton, the bride's first cousin
  - Lucy Middleton, the bride's first cousin
- Simon Middleton, the bride's paternal uncle
- Nicholas Middleton, the bride's paternal uncle
- Anne Gabriella Middleton, the bride's first cousin
- Matita Glassborow, the bride's first cousin, once removed
- Dr Penny Barton, the bride's first cousin, once removed
- David Middleton
- Elizabeth Middleton
- Timothy Middleton
- John Middleton
- Jean Harrison
- Stephen Lupton

== United Kingdom ==
=== Politicians ===
- Michael Bear (Lord Mayor of the City of London) and Barbara Bear
- Richard Benyon (Conservative MP for Newbury) and Zoe Benyon
- John Bercow (Speaker of the House of Commons) and Sally Bercow
- David Cameron (Prime Minister of the United Kingdom) and Samantha Cameron
- Kenneth Clarke (Lord High Chancellor of Great Britain and Secretary of State for Justice) and Gillian Clarke
- Nicholas Clegg (Lord President of the Council and Deputy Prime Minister of the United Kingdom) and Miriam Clegg
- The Lord Elis-Thomas (Presiding Officer of the National Assembly for Wales) and the Lady Elis-Thomas
- Alexander Fergusson (Presiding Officer of the Scottish Parliament) and Merryn Fergusson
- Simon Fraser (British Permanent Secretary of the Foreign and Commonwealth Office) and his wife
- William Hague (British Secretary of State for Foreign and Commonwealth Affairs and First Secretary of State) and Ffion Hague
- Alderman William Hay (Speaker of the Northern Ireland Assembly) and Doris Hay
- The Baroness Hayman (Lord Speaker of the House of Lords) and Martin Hayman
- Jeremy Hunt (British Secretary of State for Culture, Olympics, Media and Sport) and Lucia Guo
- The Lord Hurd of Westwell (former British Foreign and Home Secretary)
- Boris Johnson (Mayor of London) and Marina Wheeler
- Carwyn Jones (First Minister of Wales) and Lisa Jones
- Sir John Major (former British Prime Minister) and Dame Norma Major
- Theresa May (British Home Secretary and Minister for Women and Equalities) and Philip May
- Edward Miliband (British Leader of the Opposition and Leader of the Labour Party) and Justine Thornton
- Sir Augustine O'Donnell (British Cabinet Secretary) and Lady O'Donnell
- George Osborne (British Chancellor of the Exchequer) and Frances Osborne
- Peter Robinson (First Minister of Northern Ireland)
- Alexander Salmond (First Minister of Scotland) and Moira Salmond
- Judith Warner (Lord Mayor of Westminster) and Count Paolo Filo della Torre

=== Armed forces ===
- Major Tom Archer-Burton (Prince William's Commanding Officer in the Household Cavalry)
- Major William Bartle-Jones (Prince William's Squadron Leader in the Household Cavalry Regiment based at Windsor)
- Lance-Corporal Martyn Compton (Household Cavalry, injured in an ambush in Afghanistan in 2006)
- Rear Admiral Ian Corder (Royal Navy Submarine Service; Prince William was appointed as Commodore-in-Chief of the Submarine Service in 2006)
- Captain James Parke (Irish Guards; Prince William was appointed as Colonel of the Irish Guards in 2011) and Elaine Parke
- Major-General William Cubitt (Major-General commanding the Household Division and General Officer commanding London District) and Lucy Cubitt
- Air Chief Marshal Sir Stephen Dalton (Chief of the Air Staff) and Lady Dalton
- Holly Dyer (sister of Second Lieutenant Joanna Dyer, who was killed by a bomb in Iraq in 2007; Joanna Dyer had been a close friend of Prince William's at Sandhurst)
- Captain Mark Hayhurst (a friend of Prince William's) and Elizabeth Sebag-Montefiore
- General Sir Nicholas Houghton (Vice-Chief of the Defence Staff) and Lady Houghton
- Captain Harry Legge-Bourke (Welsh Guards; brother of Tiggy Legge-Bourke) and Iona Legge-Bourke, as well as his mother, Dame Shân Legge-Bourke
- Air Vice-Marshal David Murray (Defence Services Secretary) and his wife
- General Sir David Richards (Chief of the Defence Staff) and Lady Richards
- Susie Roberts (widow of Major Alexis Roberts, who was killed in Afghanistan in 2007; Alexis Roberts was Prince William's Platoon Commander at Sandhurst)
- Brigadier Edward Smyth-Osbourne (Prince William's Commanding Officer in the Household Cavalry Regiment and military mentor)
- Admiral Sir Mark Stanhope (First Sea Lord and Chief of the Naval Staff) and Lady Stanhope
- General Sir Peter Wall (Chief of the General Staff) and Lady Wall
- Bryn and Emma Parry (founders of Help for Heroes)
- Wing Commander Kevin Marsh (met Prince William through his service in the RAF)
- Squadron Leader Craig Finch (Prince William's Principal Instructor at the Defence Helicopter Flying School)
- Members of C Flight, No. 22 Squadron (at RAF Valley in Anglesey, Wales), including Wing Commander Steven Bentley; Wing Commander Iain Wright; Squadron Leader Paul Bolton; Squadron Leader David Taylor; Flight Lieutenant Thomas Bunn; Flight Lieutenant Al Conner; Sergeant Keith Best; and their wives

=== Crown dependencies ===
- Lieutenant-General Andrew Ridgway (Lieutenant Governor of Jersey)
- Adam Wood (Lieutenant Governor of the Isle of Man)

=== British Overseas Territories ===
- McKeeva Bush (Premier of the Cayman Islands) and Kerry Bush
- Peter Caruana (Chief Minister of Gibraltar) and Cristina Caruana
- Paula Cox (Premier of Bermuda) and Germain Nkeuleu
- John Cranfield (Saint Helena) and Vilma Cranfield
- Sharon Halford (member of the Legislative Assembly of the Falkland Islands) and Rodney Halford
- Reuben Meade (Premier of Montserrat) and The Revd Dr Joan Delsol Meade
- (British Virgin Islands) Ralph T. O'Neal (Premier of the Virgin Islands) and The Revd Edris O'Neal

== Other Commonwealth realms ==
- Sir Patrick Allen (Governor-General of Jamaica)
- Sir Frederick Ballantyne (Governor-General of Saint Vincent and the Grenadines) and Lady Ballantyne
  - Ralph Gonsalves (Prime Minister of Saint Vincent and the Grenadines) and Eloise Gonsalves
- Dame Quentin Bryce (Governor-General of Australia) and Michael Bryce
  - Julia Gillard (Prime Minister of Australia) and Tim Mathieson
- (The Bahamas) Sir Arthur Foulkes GCMG (Governor-General of the Bahamas) and Lady Foulkes
  - (The Bahamas) Hubert Ingraham (Prime Minister of the Bahamas) and Delores Miller
- Sir Clifford Husbands (Governor-General of Barbados)
  - Freundel Stuart (Prime Minister of Barbados)
- David Johnston (Governor General of Canada) and Dr Sharon Johnston
- Sir Frank Kabui (Governor-General of the Solomon Islands) and Lady Kabui
- Dame Pearlette Louisy (Governor-General of Saint Lucia)
  - Stephenson King (Prime Minister of Saint Lucia) and Rosella Nestor
- Sir Michael Ogio (Governor-General of Papua New Guinea) and Lady Ogio
- Sir Anand Satyanand (Governor-General of New Zealand) and Lady Satyanand
  - John Key (Prime Minister of New Zealand) and Bronagh Key
- Sir Cuthbert Sebastian (Governor-General of Saint Kitts and Nevis)
- Dame Louise Lake-Tack (Governor-General of Antigua and Barbuda)
- Sir Colville Young (Governor-General of Belize) and Lady Young

== Other royalty ==
=== Members of reigning royal houses ===
- (Belgium) The Duke and Duchess of Brabant, the groom's fourth cousin and his wife (representing the King of the Belgians)
- The Sultan and Queen of Brunei
- Sheikh Ahmad Hamoud Al-Sabah (representing the Emir of Kuwait)
- Prince Seeiso and Princess Mabereng of Lesotho (representing the King of Lesotho)
- The Grand Duke and Grand Duchess of Luxembourg, the groom's fourth cousin and his wife
- The Yang di-Pertuan Agong and Raja Permaisuri Agong of Malaysia
- The Prince of Monaco and his fiancée, Charlene Wittstock
- Princess Lalla Salma of Morocco (representing the King of Morocco)
- The Prince of Orange and Princess Máxima of the Netherlands, the groom's fifth cousin, once removed, and his wife (representing the Queen of the Netherlands)
- The Sayyid Haitham bin Tariq Al Said, Minister of Heritage and Culture (representing the Sultan of Oman)
- The Sheikha Al-Mayassa bint Hamad Al Thani and Sheikh Jassim bin Abdulaziz Al Thani (representing the Emir of Qatar)
- The Prince Mohammed bin Nawwaf al Saud (Saudi Arabian Ambassador to the United Kingdom) and Princess Fadwa bint Khalid Al Saud (representing the King of Saudi Arabia)
- The Prince Al Waleed bin Talal Al Saud and Princess Ameera al-Taweel of Saudi Arabia
- (Eswatini) The King and Queen of Swaziland
- The Princess Maha Chakri Sirindhorn of Thailand (representing the King of Thailand)
- The King of Tonga
- The Crown Prince of Abu Dhabi (representing the Emir of Abu Dhabi and President of the United Arab Emirates)

=== Members of non-reigning royal houses ===
- King Simeon II and Queen Margarita of the Bulgarians, the groom's four times fourth cousin, three times removed, and his wife
- Princess Elizabeth of Yugoslavia, the groom's second cousin, once removed

== Diplomats ==
- (France) Bernard Émié, French ambassador to the United Kingdom
- (Germany) Georg Boomgaarden, German ambassador to the United Kingdom
- (India) Nalin Surie, Indian High Commissioner to the United Kingdom
- (Israel) Ron Prosor, Israeli ambassador to the United Kingdom
- (Italy) Alain Giorgio Maria Economides, Italian ambassador to the United Kingdom
- (Japan) Keiichi Hayashi, Japanese ambassador to the United Kingdom
- (North Korea) Ja Song-nam, North Korean ambassador to the United Kingdom
- (Netherlands) Pieter Willem Waldeck, Dutch ambassador to the United Kingdom
- (Pakistan) Wajid Shamsul Hasan, Pakistani High Commissioner to the United Kingdom
- (Poland) Barbara Tuge-Erecińska, Polish ambassador to the United Kingdom
- (United States) Louis Susman, US ambassador to the United Kingdom

== Religious figures ==
=== Church of England ===
- The Most Revd and Rt Hon. Rowan Williams, Archbishop of Canterbury
- The Most Revd and Rt Hon. John Sentamu, Archbishop of York, and Margaret Sentamu
- The Very Revd John Hall, Dean of Westminster
- The Rt Revd Martin Turner, retired Bishop of Stockport

=== Other Protestant denominations ===
- The Rt Revd David Chillingworth, Primus of the Scottish Episcopal Church and Bishop of St Andrews, Dunkeld and Dunblane
- The Most Revd Alan Harper, Archbishop of Armagh
- The Rt Revd Barry Morgan, Archbishop of Wales
- The Rt Revd John Christie, Moderator of the General Assembly of the Church of Scotland
- The Rt Revd Norman Hamilton, Moderator of the Presbyterian Church in Ireland
- The Revd Gareth Morgan Jones, President of the Free Church Council of Wales
- Commissioner Elizabeth Matear

=== Roman Catholic Church ===
- Cardinal Cormac Murphy-O'Connor, Archbishop Emeritus of Westminster
- Cardinal Vincent Nichols, Archbishop of Westminster
- Cardinal Keith O'Brien, Archbishop of St Andrews and Edinburgh
- Cardinal Seán Brady, Archbishop of Armagh
- The Very Revd Canon Christopher Tuckwell, Dean of Westminster Cathedral
- The Revd Monsignor Philip Kerr, Convener of Action of Churches Together in Scotland

=== Eastern Orthodoxy ===
- The Most Revd Gregorios Theocharous, Archbishop of Thyateira and Great Britain

=== Judaism ===
- Rabbi The Lord Sacks, Chief Rabbi of the United Hebrew Congregations of the Commonwealth
- Rabbi Anthony Bayfield, President of the Movement for Reform Judaism
- Rabbi Alan Plancey

=== Islam ===
- The Aga Khan IV
- Imam Mohammad Raza
- Maulana Syed Raza Shabbarm

=== Other faiths ===
- Anil Bhanot, General Secretary of the Hindu Council UK
- Malcolm Deboo, President of the Zoroastrian Trust Funds of Europe
- Bogoda Seelawimala Thera, Head Priest of the London Buddhist Vihara
- Natubhai Shah, President of the Jain Academy
- Indarjit Singh, Director of the Network of Sikh Organisations UK
- Avinash Patra (Indology Writer of the University of Oxford)

== Friends of Prince William and Catherine Middleton ==
- Sir Eric and Lady Anderson (former Provost of Eton College and Prince Charles' teacher at Gordonstoun)
- Helen Asprey (the couple's personal private secretary)
- Oliver Baker (friend of Prince William's from university)
- Emily Bevan (friend of Middleton's from university)
- Sir Francis and Lady Paxton (family friend of Prince William's)
- Tim Billington (horse breeder)
- Olivia Bleasdale (friend of Prince William's and former flatmate from university)
- Fergus Boyd (friend of Prince William's from university) and Rosie Boyd
- Tom Bradby (ITN political editor) and Claudia Bradby (a jewellery designer who worked with Middleton at Jigsaw)
- Sir Richard and Lady Branson, and their daughter, Dr Holly Branson
  - Sam Branson (a former friend of Middleton's) was not invited, although his parents and sister did attend
- Isabella Anstruther-Gough-Calthorpe (friend of Prince William's)
- Amanda Bush (friend of Prince William's)
- Sir Henry Cheape (owner of the Strathtyrum estate in St Andrews where the couple shared a farmhouse)
- Alasdair Coutts-Wood (friend of Prince William's from university)
- Jessica Craig and Captain Philip Kaye (friends of Prince William's)
- Edward and Lady Tamara van Cutsem (childhood friends of Prince William; her mother, the Duchess of Westminster, is the Prince's godmother)
- Hugh van Cutsem (childhood friend of Prince William's) and Rose van Cutsem
- Major Nicholas van Cutsem (childhood friend of Prince William) and Alice van Cutsem
- William van Cutsem (childhood friend of Prince William's)
- Bryony Daniels (friend of Prince William's from university)
- Chelsy Davy (friend of Prince Harry's)
- David Dugmore and Roger Dugmore (safari park owners from Botswana)
- Martin and Sue Fidler (the Middleton family's butchers)
- Rupert Finch (friend of Middleton's) and Lady Natasha Isaacs (friend of Prince William's)
- Benjamin Fogle (television presenter) and Marina Fogle
- Alicia Fox-Pitt (sister of William Fox-Pitt; friend of Middleton's)
- Virginia Fraser (neighbour of the couple's while at university)
- John Haley (landlord of the local village pub in Bucklebury, frequented by the couple)
- Astrid Harbord (friend of Prince Harry's)
- Oliver Hicks (friend of Prince William's), and his parents, Charles and Virginia Hicks
- Olivia Hunt (friend of Prince William's), and her parents
- David Jardine-Paterson (banking heir; friend of Prince William's) and Emilia Jardine-Paterson
- James Jardine-Paterson (banking heir; friend of Prince William's)
- Arthur Landon (friend of Prince William's), and his mother, Lady Landon
- Tiggy Legge-Bourke (former nanny to Prince William) and Charles Pettifer
- Captain Jack Mann (polo player; friend of Prince William's)
- Lady Laura Marsham (daughter of the Earl of Romney), with her brother, The Hon. Michael Marsham
- Willem Marx (friend of Middleton's)
- Harry Meade (Old Etonian; friend of the couple's) and Rosie Meade, with his brother James, sister Lucy and their parents, Richard and Angela Meade
- Natalie Milbank (friend of the couple's) and Edward Milbank
- The Hon. Drummond Money-Coutts (Magic Circle member)
- Torquil and Irena Montague-Johnstone (friends of the Middleton family)
- Jake Mulley (friend of Prince William's)
- James Murray Wells (entrepreneur)
- Arabella Musgrave (friend of Prince William's)
- Ryan Naylor (the Middleton family's mailman)
- Hinesh Parmar (friend of the couple's)
- Guy Pelly (friend of Prince William's), with his parents, John and Vanda Pelly
- Hash Shingadia (shopkeeper at a local grocery store in Bucklebury, frequented by the couple) and his wife
- Shriman Maharaj Sahib Shri Raghav Raj Singh Shisodia, 8th Maharaj Sahib of Shivrati (friend of Prince William's) and his wife, Shailja
- Daniel Snow (historian and television presenter) and Lady Edwina Snow (her mother, the Duchess of Westminster, is the Prince's godmother)
- Thomas van Straubenzee (friend of Prince William's since prep school)
- Luke and Mark Tomlinson (friends of Prince William's) with his fiancée, Laura Bechtolsheimer
- Ben Vestey (polo player) and Chloe Vestey, with his sister, Tamara (friends of Prince William's)
- Sam Waley-Cohen (English jockey, and childhood friend of Prince William's) with his fiancée, Annabel Ballin, and his parents, Robert and Felicity Waley-Cohen
- John and Lady Carolyn Warren (the Queen's racing manager and his wife, daughter of the Queen's former racing manager, the Earl of Carnarvon), with their children, Susanna and Jake Warren
- The Duke and Duchess of Westminster (the Duchess is one of Prince William's godmothers)

== Celebrities and other notable guests ==
- Gregory Allen (yoga teacher)
- Brian Alexander (Managing Director of Mustique)
- Joseph Allbritton (former owner of Riggs Bank)
- Rowan Atkinson and his wife, Sunetra
- David and Victoria Beckham
- Amanda Berry (Chief Executive of BAFTA)
- Sir Trevor Brooking
- The Viscount Bridport
- Sir Yogendra Pasupalati (Mustique-based physician)
- Butrint R. Gashi (Executive, The Mustique Company)
- Basil Charles (owner of Basil's Bar, Mustique)
- Manuel Colonques (Chairman of Porcelanosa)
- The Dowager Duchess of Devonshire
  - The Duke and Duchess of Devonshire, old family friends
- Marquess Vittorio Frescobaldi (wine industrialist and head of the Italian Frescobaldi noble family)
- Andrew Gailey (Vice-Provost of Eton College, who was Prince William's Housemaster)
- Rear Admiral Sir Donald Gosling (co-founder National Car Parks) with Gabriella Di Nora (Diana, Princess of Wales' former personal shopper)
- Edward Gould (Master of Marlborough College between 1993 and 2003)
- Amy Huberman (Irish actress)
- Sir Elton John and David Furnish
- Count Tibor Kálnoky de Kőröspatak (Hungarian nobleman and landlord who manages Prince Charles's properties in Transylvania)
- Timur Kuanyshev (Kazakh industrialist) and Alfiya Kuanysheva
- Sir John Madejski (Chairman of Reading Football Club)
- Hugh Morrison (horse trainer), and Mary Morrison
- Philippa Naylor (designer)
- The Duke and Duchess of Northumberland, old family friends
  - Lady Catherine Valentine
  - Earl Percy
  - Lady Melissa Percy
  - Lord Max Percy
- Tara Palmer-Tomkinson (television presenter and socialite)
- Pedro Pesudo (Director of Porcelanosa)
- Juergen Pierburg (art collector and philanthropist)
- The Lord Petre (Lord Lieutenant of Essex)
- Roger Pritchard (Managing Director of The Mustique Company)
- Guy Ritchie and Jacqui Ainsley
- Lily Safra (Brazilian-Monegasque philanthropist)
- Julia Samuel (founder of Child Bereavement UK)
- Richard Schaffer (tennis coach at Mustique)
- Lucia Santa Cruz (daughter of former Chilean ambassador to the UK; friend of Prince Charles's)
- Joss Stone
- Mario Testino (fashion photographer who took the engagement photos)
- Gareth Thomas (Welsh rugby union international)
- Ian Thorpe (Australian Olympic gold medalist swimmer)
- Matthew Vaughn
- Martyn Williams (Welsh rugby player)
- Sir Clive and Lady Woodward
- Jon Zammett (Head of public relations of the German car manufacturer Audi)
- Galen Weston (Canadian businessman)

== Maid of Honour and Bridesmaids, Best Man and Page Boys ==
The groom's father, Charles, Prince of Wales, released the official cadre of bridesmaids, pages and the overall makeup of the wedding party:

=== Maid of Honour and Best man ===
- Philippa Middleton, the Maid of Honour
- Prince Henry of Wales, the Best man

=== Bridesmaids and Page Boys ===
- Lady Louise Mountbatten-Windsor, aged 7 – daughter of the Earl and Countess of Wessex, and first cousin of Prince William
- The Hon. Margarita Armstrong-Jones, aged 8 – daughter of Viscount and Viscountess Linley, and second cousin of Prince William
- Grace van Cutsem, aged 3 – daughter of Hugh and Rose van Cutsem, and goddaughter of Prince William
- Eliza Lopes, aged 3 – daughter of Harry and Laura Lopes, and granddaughter of the Duchess of Cornwall
- William Lowther-Pinkerton, aged 10 – son of James and Susannah Lowther-Pinkerton
- Thomas Pettifer, aged 8 – son of Charles and Alexandra Pettifer (commonly known as Tiggy Legge-Bourke), and godson of Prince William

== Absences ==
- The Baroness Thatcher (former Prime Minister of the United Kingdom) – Ill health
- The Duke and Duchess of Norfolk – Announcement of their separation
- Stephen Harper (Prime Minister of Canada) and his wife Laureen Harper – The wedding day was three days before the Canadian federal elections
- Grand Chief Sir Michael Somare (Prime Minister of Papua New Guinea) and Lady Somare – Sir Michael was recovering from surgery
- The King and Queen of Jordan – Protests in their country
- The Queen of the Netherlands – Her nation's observance of Queen's Day, which is the day after
- (Belgium) The King and Queen of the Belgians – The beatification ceremony for Pope John Paul II
- The King of Spain – Recovering from surgery
- The King of Sweden – His own birthday celebrations, which took place the day after
- The King of Cambodia – An important engagement in the country
- The Hereditary Prince of Liechtenstein – The beatification ceremony for Pope John Paul II
- The Crown Prince of Bahrain – The Bahraini uprising
- The Crown Prince and Crown Princess of Japan – The earthquake and tsunami that devastated their country
- Dean Barrow (Prime Minister of Belize)
- Richie McCaw (New Zealand national rugby union captain) – Commitments to his Super Rugby club, the Crusaders
- (Republic of Ireland) Brian O'Driscoll (Ireland national rugby union captain and husband of invitee, actress Amy Huberman) – Commitments to his club team, Leinster, who were to play a Heineken Cup semi-final against Toulouse the day after the wedding

== Invitation withdrawn ==
- (Syria) Sami Khiyami, the Syrian ambassador to the United Kingdom, was uninvited following the Syrian government's violent response to local protests

== See also ==
- List of wedding guests of Prince Charles and Lady Diana Spencer (1981)
- List of wedding guests of Victoria, Crown Princess of Sweden, and Daniel Westling (2010)
- List of wedding guests of Prince Harry and Meghan Markle (2018)
