= Honours (Prevention of Abuses) Act 1925 =

Act of the Parliament of the United Kingdom

Honours (Prevention of Abuses) Act 1925 (Note: Section 2.)
- Act of Parliament
- Parliament of the United Kingdom
- Long title: An Act for the prevention of abuses in connection with the Grant of Honours.
- Citation: 15 & 16 Geo. 5. c. 72
- Introduced by: The Marquess of Salisbury (Lords)
- Territorial extent: United Kingdom

Dates
- Royal assent: 7 August 1925
- Commencement: 7 August 1925 (Note: The Acts of Parliament (Commencement) Act 1793.)
Other legislation
Amended by	Administration of Justice (Miscellaneous Provisions) Act 1933; Criminal Justice Act (Northern Ireland) 1945; Criminal Procedure (Scotland) Act 1975; Criminal Law Act 1977; Criminal Procedure (Scotland) Act 1975
Relates to	Prevention of Corruption Act 1906; Bribery Act 2010

Status: Amended

Text of statute as originally enacted

Revised text of statute as amended

Text of the Honours (Prevention of Abuses) Act 1925 as in force today (including any amendments) within the United Kingdom, from legislation.gov.uk.

The Honours (Prevention of Abuses) Act 1925 (15 & 16 Geo. 5. c. 72) is an act of the Parliament of the United Kingdom, that makes the sale of peerages or any other honours illegal. The act was passed by the Parliament in the wake of David Lloyd George's 1922 cash-for-honours scandal. In 2006 a number of people connected to the Labour Party government of Tony Blair were interviewed voluntarily at Downing Street in connection with alleged offences under the 1925 Act.

== Lloyd George honours scandal ==
The act was brought in after the Liberal Party government of David Lloyd George was severely embarrassed peddling honours for party funds. The practice was legal and dated back several decades partly for new money to discreetly acquire titles; Lloyd George made the practice more systematic and more brazen, charging £10,000 for a knighthood, £30,000 for baronetcy, and £50,000 upwards for a peerage. The practice came to a halt with the notorious 1922 Birthday Honours List, which contained the names of Sir Joseph Robinson, a South African gold and diamond magnate who had been convicted of fraud and fined half a million pounds a few months earlier; Sir William Vestey, a multi-millionaire meat importer notorious for his tax evasion; Samuel Waring, who had been accused of war profiteering; and Archibald Williamson, whose oil firm had allegedly traded with the enemy during the war.

Prime Minister Lloyd George in mid-1922 was fast losing his political support, and his sales were denounced in the House of Lords as an abuse of the Prime Minister's powers of patronage.

Only one person has ever been convicted under the Act – Maundy Gregory, Lloyd George's "honours broker", in 1933 – whose same behaviour in 1918 was the main cause of the Act in the first place. Gregory's 1933 conviction was secured over his attempts to broker the selling of Vatican knighthoods in the UK. To this date, the Act has never been successfully used to convict anyone involved in the sale of UK honours.

== 2006: Cash for honours ==
In March 2006, following complaints by Scottish National Party MP Angus MacNeil, the Metropolitan Police started investigating possible breaches of the Act. A total of £5 million in loans was given by four wealthy businessmen to the Labour Party during the 2005 general election campaign, the men were subsequently nominated by Tony Blair for peerages. All four of the peerages were blocked by the House of Lords Appointments Commission. The police inquiries led to 136 people being interviewed, including Tony Blair, the first prime minister to be questioned by police as part of a political corruption inquiry, albeit "as a witness rather than a suspect". In 2007, after a £1.4 million, 19-month investigation, the police handed a 216-page report with 6,300 supporting documents to the Crown Prosecution Service which later announced it had insufficient evidence to bring charges against anyone.

== 2021: Cash for favours scandal ==
In September 2021, Michael Fawcett, Prince Charles's closest aide, "stepped down temporarily" as chief executive of The Prince's Foundation, after an investigation by The Sunday Times and the Mail on Sunday reported that he "offered to help to secure a knighthood and British citizenship" for Mahfouz Marei Mubarak bin Mahfouz, a Saudi businessman who donated £1.5m to Prince Charles's charities. William Bortrick, the editor and owner of Burke's Peerage, was named by the Sunday Times as the alleged fixer at the heart of the claims. Bortrick is said to have received thousands of pounds to secure the honour. According to the Metropolitan Police, at least two complaints were made calling for an investigation into whether Prince Charles or Michael Fawcett breached the 1925 Act. In February 2022 the Metropolitan Police launched an investigation into the cash-for-honours allegations linked to Charles' charity The Prince's Foundation. On 6 September 2022, officers interviewed under caution, a man in his fifties and a man in his forties. On 31 October 2022, the Metropolitan Police passed their evidence to the Crown Prosecution Service for deliberation.

== See also ==
- Political funding in the United Kingdom
