= Lesotho Sky =

The Lesotho Sky
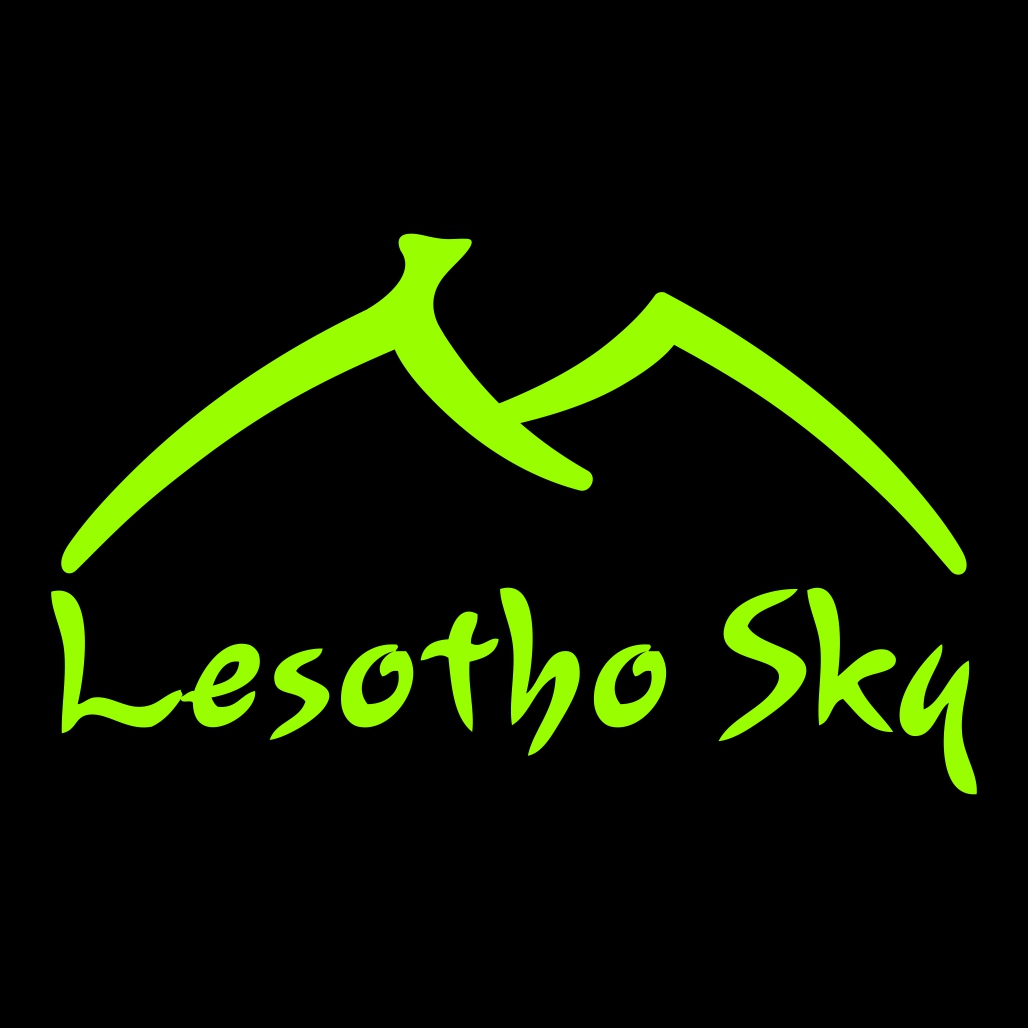

Race details
- Date: Last week of September
- Region: Lesotho
- Discipline: Mountain bike racing
- Type: Stage race
- Organiser: Sky Events (Pty) Ltd
- Race director: Darol Howes
- Web site: www.lesothosky.com

History
- First edition: 2011
- Editions: 4
- First winner: Kim Phillips (RSA); Marc Adam (RSA)
- Most recent: Louis-Bresler Knipe (RSA); Gert Heyns (RSA)

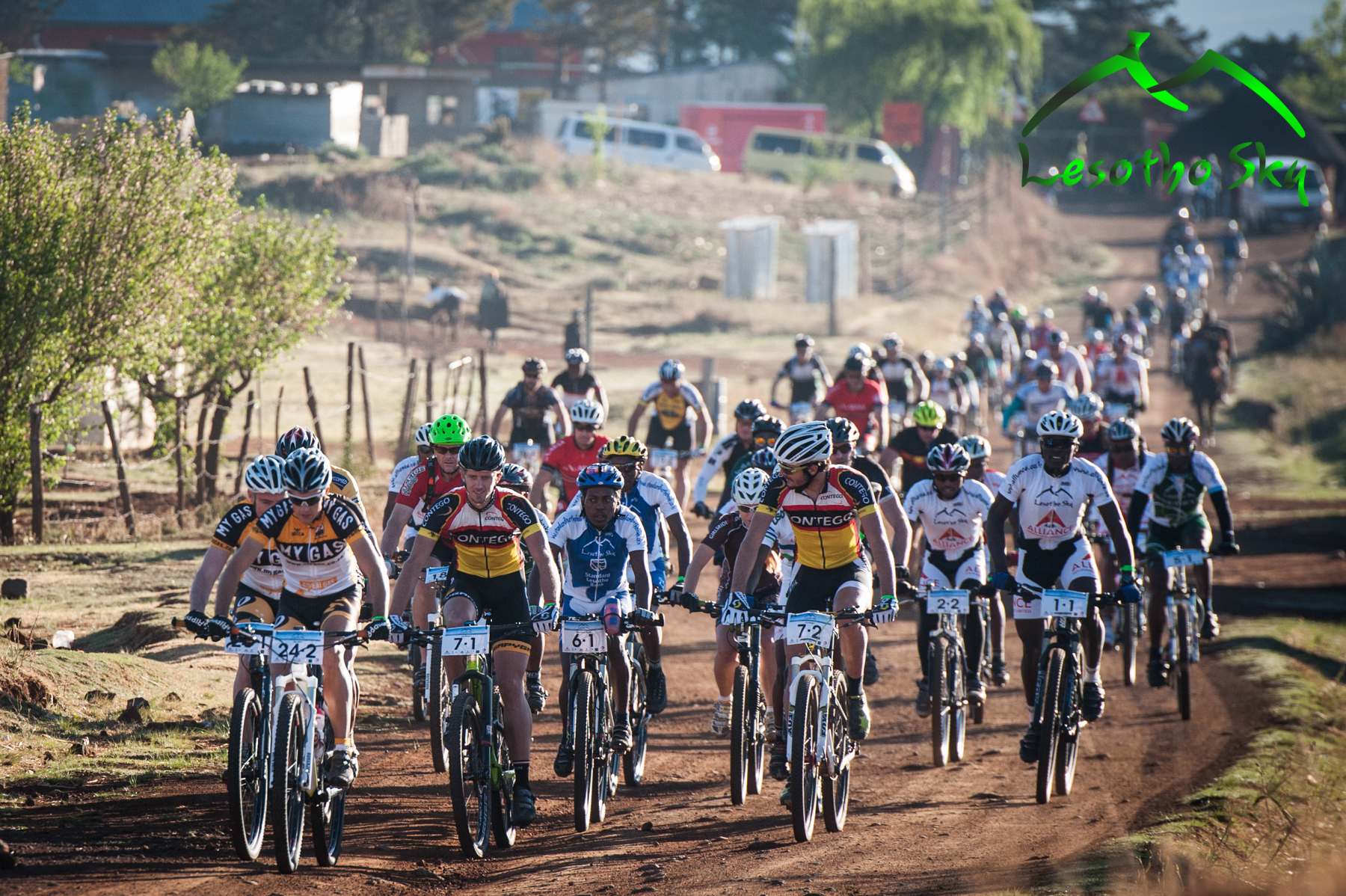
Riders at the start of Day 5 of the 2014 Lesotho Sky

The Lesotho Sky is a 6-day mountain bike stage race that takes place in the Kingdom of Lesotho. The event has been sanctioned by the Lesotho Cycling Association since 2011. It has been accredited as category 1 by the Union Cycliste Internationale (the UCI). The event first took place in 2011 covering 430 km over the 6 days. More recently the route has shortened to 340 km with a time trial through the capital of Maseru to start. The Lesotho Sky is a small event but attracts professional and amateur riders from around the world. Riders are required to ride in teams of 2 that must stay within 2 minutes of each other throughout the event. The times taken for each team to finish each day are added together and the shortest total time is the winner.

== Origins ==
The flag of Lesotho

The Lesotho Sky was foundered in 2011 by Christian Schmidt and Darol Howes. The idea was conceived on a mountain bike tour across the small mountainous Kingdom of Lesotho in January 2011. Starting in the village in Morija on the west to finish going down Sani pass on the east. Christian is from Germany but spent several years in Morija in Lesotho during his youth and knew that Lesotho had huge potential for mountain biking. After returning to Africa to study at the University of Cape Town he joined the UCT cycling club and organized the tour. His love for both Lesotho and his mountain bike are what drives the success of the event.

The first event took place in November 2011 with just 22 people, 10 of which were from Lesotho.

The Lesotho Sky is now a top bucket list stage race and as of 2015 is a Class 1 Union Cycliste Internationale stage race.

== Route ==
The route is typically between 340 kilometres and 400 kilometres in length split over 6 days. The route starts in Lesotho's Capital Maseru at the Lesotho Sun Hotel and Casino with a 20 kilometres prologue that was introduced during the 2013 edition of the race. The following 5 days are all in rural areas of the Maseru and Mafeteng Districts of Lesotho.

== History ==
=== Timeline from 2011 ===
Date	Description
2011	Christian Schmidt and Darol Howes go on a mountain bike tour of Lesotho and talk of starting something similar to the Absa Cape Epic there.
2011	The first ever Lesotho Sky is launched starting in Morija and finishing at the Mohale Dam. Total Participation: 22 riders Total Distance: ±430 kilometres
2012	40 Riders partake at the second edition of the race. A circular route is first adopted to make race logistics easier. Total Participation: 40 Riders Total Distance: ±380 kilometres
2013	The Maseru time trial was introduced as the prologue of the race. The Lesotho Sky is a UCI Class 2 Stage race for the first time. Total Participation: 60 Riders Distance: ±380 kilometres
2014	Phetetso Monese (LES) and Teboho Khantsi (LES) of team Alliance Insurance become the first ever Basotho team to win a stage of the Lesotho Sky. Total Participation: 78 riders Total Distance: ±340 kilometres

=== Winners ===
==== Men ====
Year	Team	Rider 1	Rider 2
2011	The MarKim Veterans	Kim Phillips	Marc Adam
2012	Merrell	Tim Ellerbeck	Carel Bezuidenhoud
2013	Scott Factory Racing	Matthys Beukes	Phillip Buys
2014	Contego	Louis-Bresler Knipe	Gert Heyns

==== Women ====
Year	Team	Rider 1	Rider 2
2012	First Ascent	Miriam Stronkhorst	Theresa Horn
2013	-	-	-
2014	Masikhule	Janet Keet	Caroline Schuermans

==== Mixed ====
Year	Team	Rider 1	Rider 2
2011	Talisman Plant & Tool Hire	Hannele Steyn	Colin Du Plessis
2012	Glen Erskine Wines	John Dalton	Hanri Dalton
2013	Display Mania	Leanne Brown-Waterson	Etienne Joubert
2014	Thousand Trails	Alisha Myers	Alvin Hirner

== Official charities ==
In 2014 Sentebale founded in 2006 by Prince Harry of the British royal family and Prince Seeiso of the Lesotho royal family became the Lesotho Sky's official event charity.
