= Mamonaheng Mokitimi =

President of the Senate of the Kingdom of Lesotho

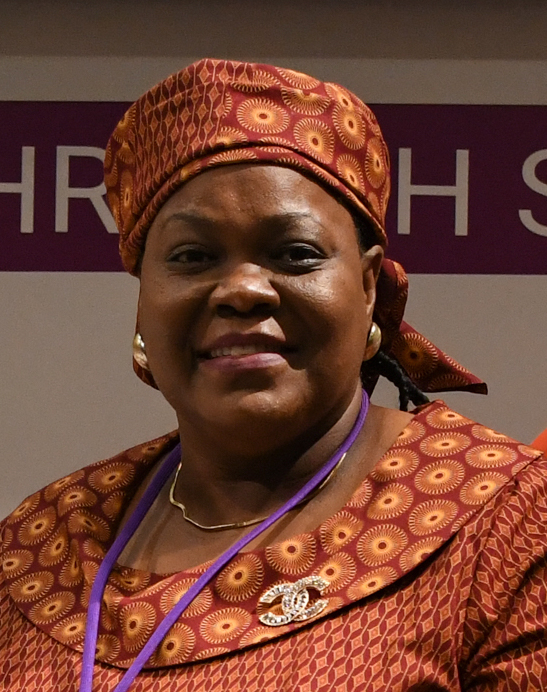

President of the Senate of Lesotho
- Incumbent
- Assumed office 11 July 2017
- Preceded by: Prince Seeiso of Lesotho

Vice President of the Senate of Lesotho
- In office 2012 – 11 July 2017

Personal details
- Born: 20 January 1970 (age 56) Morija, Lesotho
- Education: National University of Lesotho (BA; PGC )

Mamonaheng Mokitimi (born 20 January 1970) is a Mosotho politician who has served as President of the Senate of Lesotho since 2017. She is the first woman to serve as President and Vice President of the Senate.

== Early life and education ==
Mamonaheng Mokitimi was born in Morija, Lesotho, on 20 January 1970, alongside a twin. She graduated from the National University of Lesotho with a bachelor of arts degree in 1996, and a postgraduate certificate in education in 1997.

== Career ==
Mokitimi worked as a teacher at Methodist High School. In 1999, Mokitimi became the principal interpreter for the Senate of Lesotho and was promoted to clerk assistant before her resignation in 2012. She was a HIV/AIDS coordinator during her time as clerk assistant.

In 2012, she was elected as Vice President of the Senate, the first woman to hold the position. On 11 July 2017, she was elected as President of the Senate, becoming the first woman to hold the position, and was reelected on 3 November 2022. In 2018, she stated that she wanted the Senate to have its own parliamentary service rather than using the Ministry of Public Service, criticised the poor relations between senators and staffers, and noted the lack of cordial relations between the Senate and National Assembly.

On 17 January 2019, Mokitimi filed a libel suit against five principal chiefs and a senior senate official seeking M25,000. Mota Nkuatsana, one of the six charged, accused Mokitimi of having committed financial misconduct as assistant clerk. The lawsuit was withdrawn on 21 May, and Mokitimi paid the legal fees.

== Works cited ==
=== News ===
- Mohloboli, Marafaele (24 November 2018). "Animosity crippling Senate's work: Mokitimi". Lesotho Times. Archived from the original on 28 November 2018.
- Zihlangu, Bongiwe (24 May 2019). "Mokitimi drops libel suit against chiefs". Public Eye News. Archived from the original on 24 June 2025.

=== Web ===
- "Lesotho". Inter-Parliamentary Union. Archived from the original on 24 June 2025.
- "President of the Senate". Senate of Lesotho. Archived from the original on 24 June 2025.
