= Sempe Lejaha =

Sempe Lejaha (born 24 June 1943) was a Lesotho politician who was the President of the Senate and served as the Lesotho Ambassador to Italy. He died in Rome in 2015.

== Early life ==
Lejaha was born in Phororong in the district of Berea. He was of the Matšekha clan and was the chief of Phororong and Majaheng villages in Berea.

== Career ==
Lejaha career began as a district administrator of Berea, Quthing and Butha-Buthe before being elected Deputy President of the Senate and later became president serving until January 2013 when he retired from the parliament. After his retirement from the senate, he was appointed Ambassador of the Kingdom of Lesotho to Italy. He was recalled along with other diplomats in 2015 just two years into a four-year term.

== Death ==
He was found dead in his residence in Rome in August 2015.
