= William Bortrick =

British genealogist

William Bortrick FRSA (born 30 April 1973) is a British genealogist who is the owner, chairman and editor of Burke's Peerage.

Per the pedigree in the publication he edits, Bortrick claims descent from the fourth Lord Borthwick through his daughter Margaret- who married the unrelated Sir John Borthwick, himself "of obscure origins ... not, as has been claimed, a son of William, third Lord Borthwick"- via a branch resident in Ireland since the 1600s, primarily at Ballymena in County Antrim, where they were builders.

He studied history at the University of Oxford, and Wolfson College, Cambridge.

In September 2021, Prince Charles's closest aide Michael Fawcett "stepped down temporarily" as chief executive of The Prince's Foundation, after an investigation by The Sunday Times and the Mail on Sunday reported that he "offered to help to secure a knighthood and British citizenship" for a Saudi tycoon, who donated £1.5m to Prince Charles's charities. Bortrick was named by The Sunday Times as the alleged fixer at the heart of the claims. Bortrick is said to have received thousands of pounds to secure the honour. According to the Metropolitan Police, at least two complaints were made calling for an investigation into whether Prince Charles or Michael Fawcett breached the Honours (Prevention of Abuses) Act 1925. In February 2022, the Metropolitan Police launched an investigation into the cash-for-honours allegations linked to Charles' charity The Prince's Foundation.

On 16 February 2024, Bortrick was disqualified by the Charity Commission from being a trustee or senior manager at any charity for 12 years. In one instance, the Charity Commission found that a desk and bookcase had been bought for £16,000 using the Burke's Peerage Foundation's charitable funds, and were then kept and used at Bortrick's home.
