= Senate of Lesotho =

Upper chamber of Lesotho's bicameral Parliament

Coordinates: 29.322739542481237°S 27.49252454519462°E

Senate Ntlong ea Mahosana

Type
- Type: Upper house of the Parliament of Lesotho

History
- Founded: 1965

Leadership
- President: Mamonaheng Mokitimi since 11 July 2017
- Deputy President of the Senate of Lesotho: Tsukutlane Au

Structure
- Seats: 33
- Length of term: 5 years

Meeting place
- Parliament building in Maseru

Website
- senate.parliament.ls

The Senate of Lesotho (Sotho: Ntlong ea Mahosana) is the upper chamber of the Parliament of Lesotho, which, along with the National Assembly of Lesotho (the lower chamber), comprises the legislature of Lesotho.

Bicameralism in Lesotho is specifically modeled after the Westminster system of the United Kingdom, having an upper house weaker than the lower. As such, the Senate holds less power than the National Assembly; it cannot initiate legislation, it does not appoint the Prime Minister, and it does not participate in motions of confidence. The Senate's consent is required to amend certain clauses of the constitution, and for a bill to become law, it must be passed by both chambers of Parliament.

The current Senate has a total of 33 members. 22 are hereditary tribal chiefs who perform executive functions for their respective communities and 11 are nominated by the king on the prime minister's advice and generally align with the King in their legislative behavior. Members serve five-year terms. Senators may not serve simultaneously as members of the National Assembly.

The Senate used to sit in the same Parliament building as the National Assembly, although in 2026 the Senate moved to a purpose built chamber adjacent to the Parliament. The complex was constructed and financed by the Chinese government.

Mamonaheng Mokitimi is the current president of the Senate. She succeeded Prince Seeiso Bereng Seeiso.

== See also ==
- National Assembly of Lesotho – the lower chamber of Parliament
- History of Lesotho
- Legislative branch
- List of national legislatures
- List of presidents of the Senate of Lesotho
