= Sophie Chandauka =

Zimbabwean lawyer

Sophie Chandauka MBE
- Born: Sophia Tendai Chandauka; 1978 (age 47–48); Harare, Zimbabwe
- Education: Lake Superior State University (LSSU)

Sophie Tendai Chandauka (born 1978) is a Zimbabwean corporate finance lawyer. In 2025, she made headlines for her role in a dispute involving the charity Sentebale.

== Education ==
Following primary and secondary education in Harare, Zimbabwe, Chandauka was sponsored by Rotary International in 1994 as a Rotary Youth Exchange student for a year in Sault Ste. Marie, Ontario, Canada. She then attended Lake Superior State University (LSSU) in Michigan, where she was awarded another Rotary scholarship to study at the University of Birmingham in the United Kingdom for a year.

== Career ==
In 2007, Chandauka was shortlisted as a finalist for the British Legal Awards "Young Solicitor of the Year". In 2008, she was shortlisted as a finalist for The Lawyer Awards "Assistant Solicitor of the Year". Also in that year, Chandauka was selected as one of Management Today's "35 Women Under 35" businesswomen to watch and was featured on the cover of the July 2008 issue of the magazine with four other women.

In the same year, Chandauka was invited to Lake Superior State University to receive the Paul Ripley Young Alumna Award. In autumn 2011, she was shortlisted as a finalist for the Women of the Future Awards. In March 2013 she was featured in Financial News' editorial pick of 40 Rising Stars in the European legal profession aged under 40. She is a member of the Executive Leadership Council (ELC) – a membership organisation committed to increasing the number of senior black executives in global enterprises.

In the 2021 Queen's birthday honours she was awarded an MBE "for services to Diversity in Business."

In 2023, Coventry University awarded her an honorary doctorate.

== Sentebale charity ==
In 2008, Chandauka was appointed to the board of trustees of Sentebale ("Forget Me Not" in Sesotho), an African children's charity established by Prince Seeiso of Lesotho and Prince Harry to help vulnerable children and young people in Lesotho, particularly those orphaned as a result of HIV/AIDS.

In 2025, a dispute arose between Chandauka and the board of trustees, around a decision about focusing the charity's fundraising on America. The dispute resulted in the board asking her to resign as chair. She refused and the board resigned in protest, which led to Prince Harry and Prince Seeiso resigning as patrons. Chandauka sued the charity and reported it to the Charity Commission, claiming that what caused the conflict was that she had "blown the whistle" about "poor governance, weak executive management, abuse of power, bullying, harassment, misogyny, misogynoir – and the coverup that ensued" in Sentebale. In early April 2025, the Charity Commission announced that they had formally opened an investigation into the dispute. In August 2025 the Charity Commission announced it found no evidence of "widespread or systemic bullying or harassment, including misogyny or misogynoir" or "over-reach" by either Chandauka or Prince Harry but acknowledged a "strong perception of ill treatment felt by a number of parties" and stated that deciding on specific allegations of bullying was outside the purview of its regulatory authority. It also criticised all sides for allowing the conflict "to play out publicly" and cited poor internal governance and a "failure to resolve disputes internally" as factors that impacted the charity's reputation.
