= Betty Matear =

Born Elizabeth Kowbus in Scotland, Betty Matear went to the Salvation Army’s International Training College where she met her husband John. They married in 1978 and had one son, John.

For the first ten years of her service as a Salvation Army officer, Betty, together with her husband, served as a corps officer at Godalming, Reading, Hove and Chester-le-Street. In 1987 the Matears moved to Yorkshire where they served as Divisional Youth Secretaries and, from 1990 to 1994, as Church Growth Consultants. In 1994 Betty became the Divisional Director for Personnel at the Yorkshire Salvation Army headquarters, followed by a move in 1997 to the Salvation Army’s territorial headquarters serving in the Personnel department.

From 1999 to 2001 Betty Matear served as the Divisional Director of Women’s Ministries for the East Midlands, based in Nottingham. Promoted to the rank of Colonel the Matears moved to Kingston, Jamaica in 2001, where Betty was appointed the Territorial President of Women’s Ministries for the Caribbean. While serving in Jamaica Betty and John Matear were promoted to the rank of Commissioner, and in 2006 the now Commissioner Betty Matear was appointed as Territorial President of Women’s Ministries in the United Kingdom, based in London.

In April 2007 Commissioner Betty Matear became the first Salvationist to become Moderator of the Free Churches Group in the UK, a position in which she served until 13 April 2011, when she was succeeded by the Rev Michael Heaney.

Betty Matear is also a published author and has appeared on Radio 4’s Prayer for the Day programme.

During her time as Moderator of the Free Churches Group, Betty Matear attended the Remembrance Day services at the Cenotaph in Central London. She was also on the guest list of the 2011 Royal Wedding.
