= List of presidents of the Senate of Lesotho =

List of presidents of the Senate of Lesotho.

This is a list of presidents of the Senate of Lesotho.

Name	Took office	Left office	Notes
Hon. S. P. Makotoko	1965	17 May 1966	President of the Senate of Basutoland
Hon. Nathaniel Qhobela	1966	1968	
Hon. Thomas Mofolo Mofolo	1968	1970	
In abeyance	1970	1985	
Hon. George Bereng	1985	20 January 1986	
Dissolved	20 January 1986	1993	
Hon. Thabo Ntlhakana	1993	1998	
Hon. Sempe Lejaha	16 June 1998	2007	
Hon. Morena Letapata Makhaola	9 March 2007	2015	
Hon. Prince Seeiso Bereng Seeiso	2015	2017	
Hon. Mamonaheng Mokitimi	11 July 2017	Incumbent	
