= Phetetso Monese =

Mosotho cyclist

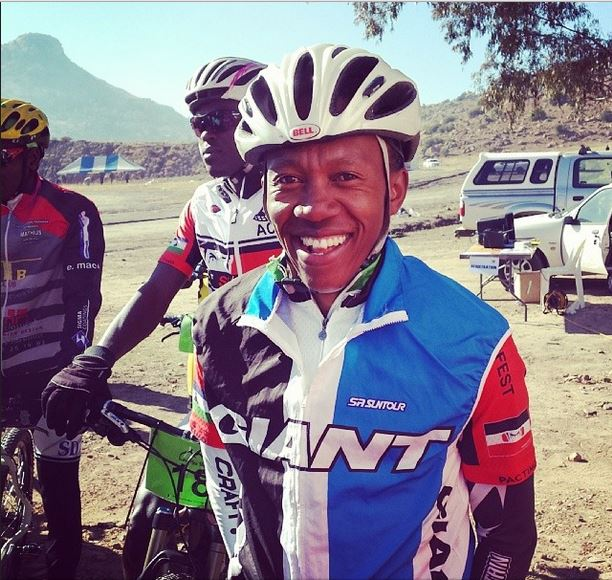
- Phetetso Monese at the Lesotho Sky qualification race 2014

Personal information
- Born: September 22, 1984 (age 42) Maputsoe, Lesotho

Cycling career
- Sport: Cycling
- Discipline: Mountain bike
- Role: Rider
- Rider type: Cross-country, marathon

Professional team
- ACE - THE SUFFERFEST - LESOTHO MTB TEAM

Major wins
- Lesotho National Championships, Cross Country (2014, 2015); Lesotho National Championships, XC Marathon (2013)
Medal record
Representing Lesotho
Men's mountain bike racing
Lesotho Championships
| Gold medal – first place | 2013 | Cross Country Marathon |
| Gold medal – first place | 2014 | Cross Country |
| Gold medal – first place | 2015 | Cross Country |
Lesotho Sky
| Silver medal – second place | 2014 Lesotho Sky | Overall |

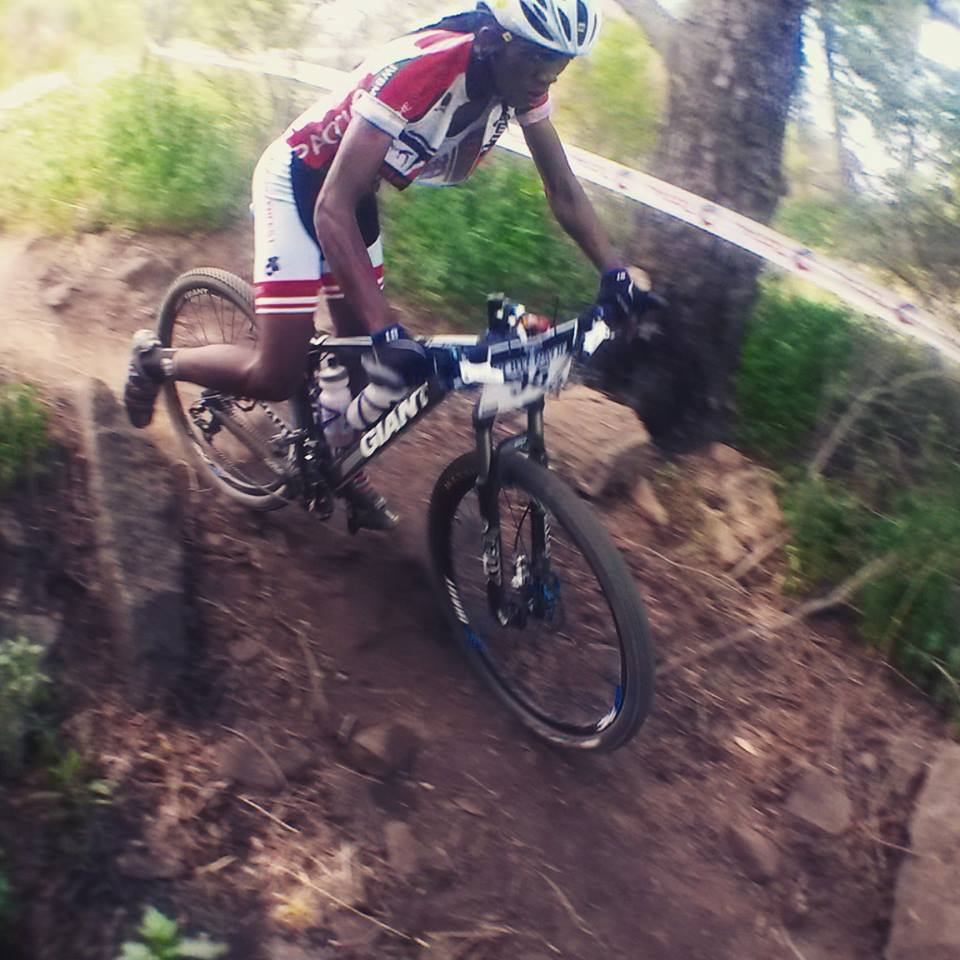
Phetetso Monese leading the 2015 Lesotho Sun Cross Country Course test race.

Phetetso Monese (born September 22, 1984 in Maputsoe, Lesotho) is a retired cross-country mountain biker who placed 21st at the 2014 Commonwealth Games in Glasgow. He was a member of the Ace - The Sufferfest - Lesotho MTB Team.

Phetetso Monese was part of the first Basotho team to feature as part of the podium of the UCI Lesotho Sky stage race coming 2nd overall and winning day 4 of the event. Monese qualified for the 2016 Summer Olympics, becoming the first Olympic cyclist from Lesotho.
