= List of wedding guests of Prince Charles and Lady Diana Spencer =

The guest list at the wedding of Prince Charles and Lady Diana Spencer on 29 July 1981 included many members of royal families from around the world, republican heads of state, and members of the bride's and groom's families. As Prince Charles was heir to the British throne, the event was automatically deemed a "state occasion", formally requiring the invitation of many foreign heads of state; in addition, the marriage of the prince, who remained a bachelor until the age of 32, to the 20-year-old Lady Diana drew much attention from around the world. The guest list for the wedding, which took place at St Paul's Cathedral in London, included 3,500 people.

== Relatives of the groom ==
=== British royal family ===
- The Queen and the Duke of Edinburgh, the groom's parents
  - Princess Anne, Mrs Mark Phillips and Captain Mark Phillips, the groom's sister and brother-in-law
  - Prince Andrew, the groom's brother
  - Prince Edward, the groom's brother
- Queen Elizabeth the Queen Mother, the groom's maternal grandmother
  - Princess Margaret, Countess of Snowdon, the groom's maternal aunt
    - Viscount Linley, the groom's first cousin
    - Lady Sarah Armstrong-Jones, the groom's first cousin (bridesmaid)
- Princess Alice, Duchess of Gloucester, the groom's maternal great-aunt by marriage
  - The Duke and Duchess of Gloucester, the groom's first cousin once removed and his wife
    - Earl of Ulster, the groom's second cousin
- The Duke and Duchess of Kent, the groom's first cousin once removed and his wife
  - Earl of St Andrews, the groom's second cousin
  - Lady Helen Windsor, the groom's second cousin
  - Lord Nicholas Windsor, the groom's second cousin (pageboy)
- Princess Alexandra, The Hon. Mrs Angus Ogilvy, and the Hon. Angus Ogilvy, the groom's first cousin once removed and her husband
  - James Ogilvy, the groom's second cousin
  - Marina Ogilvy, the groom's second cousin
- Prince and Princess Michael of Kent, the groom's first cousin once removed and his wife

=== Other descendants of Queen Victoria ===
- The Earl and Countess of Harewood, the groom's first cousin once removed and his wife
- The Hon. Gerald Lascelles and Elizabeth Lascelles, the groom's first cousin once removed and his wife
- The Duke of Fife, the groom's second cousin once removed
- Captain Alexander Ramsay of Mar and the Lady Saltoun, the groom's second cousin twice removed and his wife

=== Teck-Cambridge family ===
- The Marchioness of Cambridge, widow of the groom's first cousin twice removed
  - Lady Mary and Peter Whitley, the groom's second cousin once removed and her husband
- The Duke of Beaufort, husband of the groom's first cousin twice removed
- Lady May and Colonel The Hon. Sir Henry Abel Smith, the groom's first cousin twice removed and her husband

=== Mountbatten family ===
- The Prince and Princess of Hohenlohe-Langenburg, the groom's first cousin and his wife
- Prince and Princess Andreas of Hohenlohe-Langenburg, the groom's first cousin and his wife
- Princess Beatrix of Hohenlohe-Langenburg, the groom's first cousin
- Prince and Princess Ludwig of Baden, the groom's first cousin and his wife
- Princess Sophie and Prince George William of Hanover, the groom's paternal aunt and uncle
  - Prince and Princess Karl of Hesse, the groom's first cousin and his wife
  - Prince Georg of Hanover, the groom's first cousin
- The Countess Mountbatten of Burma and the Lord Brabourne, the groom's first cousin once removed and her husband
  - Lord and Lady Romsey, the groom's second cousin and his wife
  - The Hon. Michael-John Knatchbull, the groom's second cousin
  - Lady Joanna Knatchbull, the groom's second cousin
  - Lady Amanda Knatchbull, the groom's second cousin
  - The Hon. Philip Knatchbull, the groom's second cousin
  - The Hon. Timothy Knatchbull, the groom's second cousin
- Lady Pamela and David Hicks, the groom's first cousin once removed and her husband
  - Edwina Hicks, the groom's second cousin
  - Ashley Hicks, the groom's second cousin
  - India Hicks, the groom's second cousin (bridesmaid)

=== Bowes-Lyon family ===
- The Earl and Countess of Strathmore and Kinghorne, the groom's first cousin once removed and his wife
  - Lord Glamis, the groom's second cousin
  - Lady Elizabeth Bowes-Lyon, the groom's second cousin
- Lady Mary and Timothy Colman, the groom's first cousin once removed and her husband
- The Hon. Margaret and Denys Rhodes, the groom's first cousin once removed and her husband
- Prince Georg of Denmark, the groom's second cousin once removed (and widower of the groom's first cousin once removed)
  - Lady Elizabeth Shakerley, the groom's second cousin

== Relatives of the bride ==
=== Spencer family ===
- The Earl and Countess Spencer, the bride's father and stepmother
  - Lady Sarah and Neil McCorquodale, the bride's sister and brother-in-law
  - Lady Jane and Robert Fellowes, the bride's sister and brother-in-law
  - Viscount Althorp, the bride's brother
- Lady Anne and Captain Christopher Wake-Walker, the bride's paternal aunt and uncle
  - Elizabeth and Anthony Duckworth-Chad, the bride's first cousin and her husband
  - David and Jenni Wake-Walker, the bride's first cousin and his wife
  - Richard and Sharon Wake-Walker, the bride's first cousin and his wife
  - Major Michael Wake-Walker, the bride's first cousin
  - Diana and Major Charles MacFarlane, the bride's first cousin and her husband
- Captain the Hon. George Spencer, the bride's paternal great-uncle
  - Robert Spencer, the bride's first cousin once removed
- Lady Margaret Douglas-Home, the bride's paternal great-aunt

=== Roche family ===
- The Hon. Frances and Peter Shand Kydd, the bride's mother and stepfather
- The Dowager Lady Fermoy, the bride's maternal grandmother
  - The Hon. Mary and Michael Gunningham, the bride's maternal aunt and uncle
    - Alexandra Berry, the bride's first cousin
    - Antonia Berry, the bride's first cousin
    - Edward Berry, the bride's first cousin
  - The Lord and Lady Fermoy, the bride's maternal uncle and aunt
    - The Hon. Frances Roche, the bride's first cousin
    - The Hon. Maurice Roche, the bride's first cousin
    - The Hon. Hugh Roche, the bride's first cousin

=== Hamilton family ===
- The Dowager Duchess of Abercorn, the bride's paternal great-aunt by marriage (Mistress of the Robes to Queen Elizabeth the Queen Mother)
  - The Duke and Duchess of Abercorn, the bride's paternal first cousin once removed and his wife (the groom's fourth cousin)

== Foreign royalty ==
=== Reigning royalty ===
- (Belgium) The King and Queen of the Belgians, the groom's third cousin once removed and his wife
- The Queen and Prince Henrik of Denmark, the groom's third cousin once removed and her husband
- The Crown Prince and Crown Princess of Japan (representing the Emperor of Japan)
- The Crown Prince of the Hashemite Kingdom of Jordan and Princess Sarvath El Hassan (representing the King of the Hashemite Kingdom of Jordan)
- The Queen of Lesotho (representing the King of Lesotho)
- The Prince and Princess of Liechtenstein, the groom's fifth cousin twice removed and his wife
  - The Hereditary Prince and Hereditary Princess of Liechtenstein, the groom's sixth cousin once removed and his wife
- The Grand Duke and Grand Duchess of Luxembourg, the groom's fourth cousin and the groom's third cousin
- The Princess of Monaco (representing the Prince of Monaco)
  - The Hereditary Prince of Monaco, the groom's seventh cousin
- (Kingdom of Nepal) Prince Gyanendra and Princess Komal of Nepal (representing the King of Nepal)
- The Queen and Prince Claus of the Netherlands, the groom's sixth cousin once removed and her husband
- The King of Norway, the groom's first cousin twice removed
  - The Crown Prince and Crown Princess of Norway, the groom's second cousin once removed, and his wife
- (Eswatini) Princess Lindiwe of Swaziland (representing the King of Swaziland)
- The King and Queen of Sweden, the groom's third cousin once removed, and his wife
- (Sweden) Princess Margaretha, Mrs John Ambler, and John Ambler, the groom's third cousin once removed and her husband
- The Princess Royal of Thailand (representing the King of Thailand)
- The King and Queen of Tonga
- The Head of State of Western Samoa

=== Non-reigning royalty ===
- The Aga Khan and Begum Salimah Aga Khan
- Tsar Simeon II and Tsarista Margarita of Bulgaria, the groom's fourth cousin twice removed, and his wife
- King Constantine II of the Hellenes, the groom's second cousin
  - Princess Alexia of Greece and Denmark, the groom's second cousin once removed
  - Crown Prince Pavlos of Greece, the groom's second cousin once removed
  - Prince Nikolaos of Greece and Denmark, the groom's second cousin once removed
- The Princess of Hesse and by Rhine, widow of the groom's first cousin twice removed
- King Michael I and Queen Anne of Romania, the groom's second cousin and the groom's second cousin once removed
- Princess Paul of Yugoslavia, the groom's first cousin once removed

== Politicians and diplomats ==
=== British politicians ===
- Margaret Thatcher, Prime Minister of the United Kingdom, and Denis Thatcher
  - Harold Macmillan, former Prime Minister of the United Kingdom
  - The Lord Home of the Hirsel, former Prime Minister of the United Kingdom, and the Lady Home of the Hirsel
  - Sir Harold Wilson, former Prime Minister of the United Kingdom, and Lady Wilson
  - Edward Heath, former Prime Minister of the United Kingdom
  - James Callaghan, former Prime Minister of the United Kingdom, and Audrey Callaghan
- Sir Geoffrey Howe, Chancellor of the Exchequer, and Lady Howe
- The Lord Carrington, Secretary of State for Foreign and Commonwealth Affairs, and the Lady Carrington
- William Whitelaw, Secretary of State for the Home Department, and Celia Whitelaw
- The Lord Hailsham of Saint Marylebone, Lord High Chancellor of Great Britain, and the Hon. Mary Hogg
- John Nott, Secretary of State for Defence, and Miloska Nott
- The Lord Soames, Leader of the House of Lords and Lord President of the Council, and the Lady Soames
- James Prior, Secretary of State for Employment, and Jane Prior
- Sir Ian Gilmour, Lord Keeper of the Privy Seal, and Lady Caroline Gilmour
- Peter Walker, Minister of Agriculture, Fisheries and Food, and Tessa Walker
- Michael Heseltine, Secretary of State for the Environment, and Anne Heseltine
- The Hon. George Younger, Secretary of State for Scotland, and Diana Younger
- Humphrey Atkins, Secretary of State for Northern Ireland, and Margaret Atkins
- Nicholas Edwards, Secretary of State for Wales, and Ann Edwards
- Patrick Jenkin, Secretary of State for Social Services, and Monica Jenkin
- John Biffen, Secretary of State for Trade, and Sarah Biffen
- David Howell, Secretary of State for Energy, and Cary Howell
- Mark Carlisle, Secretary of State for Education and Science, and Sandra Carlisle
- Leon Brittan, Chief Secretary to the Treasury, and Diana Brittan
- Norman Fowler, Secretary of State for Transportation, and Fiona Fowler
- Michael Jopling, Chief Whip of the House of Commons, and Hilary Jopling
- Wyn Roberts, Parliamentary Under-Secretary of Wales
- Sir Michael Havers, Attorney General for England and Wales and Northern Ireland, and Lady Havers
- Sir Robert Armstrong, Cabinet Secretary, and Lady Armstrong
- Sir Ronald Gardner-Thorpe, Lord Mayor of London, and the Lady Mayoress
- Ronald Watkiss, Lord Mayor of Cardiff, and the Lady Mayoress
- The Lord Lane, Lord Chief Justice of England and Wales, and the Lady Lane
- George Thomas, Speaker of the House of Commons
- Michael Foot, Leader of the Opposition, and Jill Foot
- Denis Healey, Deputy Leader of the Opposition
- Michael Cocks, Shadow Chief Whip of the House of Commons
- Merlyn Rees, Shadow Secretary of State for Energy
- Albert Booth, Shadow Secretary of State for Transport
- Peter Shore, Shadow Chancellor of Exchequer
- The Lord Cledwyn of Penrhos, former Secretary of State for Wales, and the Lady Cledwyn of Penrhos
- David Steel, Leader of the Liberal Party
- David Owen, Leader of the Social Democratic Party

=== Governors-general ===
- Sir Zelman Cowen, Governor-General of Australia, and Lady Cowen
- (The Bahamas) Sir Gerald Cash, Governor-General of the Bahamas, and Lady Cash
- Sir Deighton Lisle Ward, Governor-General of Barbados, and Lady Ward
- Edward Schreyer, Governor General of Canada, and Lily Schreyer
- (Dominion of Fiji) Ratu Sir George Cakobau, Governor-General of Fiji, and Lady Cakobau
- Sir Paul Scoon, Governor-General of Grenada, and Lady Scoon
- Sir Florizel Glasspole, Governor-General of Jamaica, and Lady Glasspole
- Sir Dayendranath Burrenchobay, Governor-General of Mauritius, and Lady Burenchobay
- Sir David Beattie, Governor-General of New Zealand, and Lady Beattie
- Sir Tore Lokoloko, Governor-General of Papua New Guinea, and Lady Lokoloko
- Sir Baddeley Devesi, Governor-General of the Solomon Islands, and Lady Devesi
- (Saint Vincent and the Grenadines) Sir Sydney Gun-Munro, Governor-General of St. Vincent and the Grenadines

=== Commonwealth heads of state and government ===
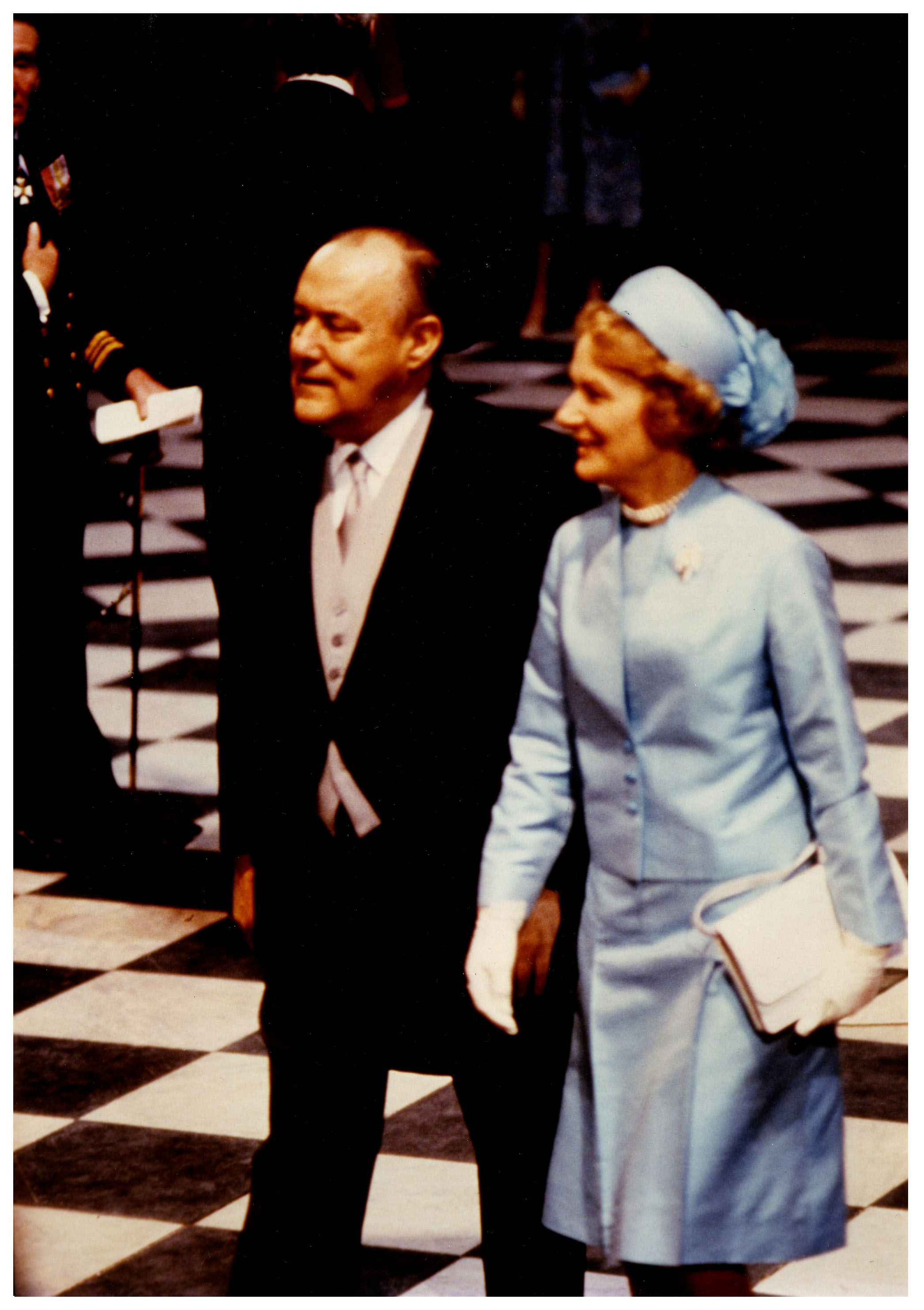
Robert Muldoon, Prime Minister of New Zealand, and his wife Thea attending the wedding

- Malcolm Fraser, Prime Minister of Australia, and Tamie Fraser
- (The Bahamas) Lynden Pindling, Prime Minister of the Bahamas, and Marguerite Pindling
- Tom Adams, Prime Minister of Barbados, and Genevieve Adams
- Pierre Trudeau, Prime Minister of Canada
- Spyros Kyprianou, President of the Republic of Cyprus, and Mimi Kyprianou
- Aurelius Marie, President of the Commonwealth of Dominica, and Bernadette Marie
- Ratu Sir Kamisese Mara, Prime Minister of Fiji, and Ro Lady Mara
- (The Gambia) Sir Dawda Jawara, President of the Republic of the Gambia
- Forbes Burnham, President of the Co-operative Republic of Guyana, and Viola Burnham
- Neelam Sanjiva Reddy, President of the Republic of India
- Charles Njonjo, Minister of Justice of the Republic of Kenya
- Ieremia Tabai, President of the Republic of Kiribati
- Hammer DeRoburt, President of the Republic of Nauru, and Lukale DeRoburt
- Robert Muldoon, Prime Minister of New Zealand, and Thea Muldoon
- Alex Ekwueme, Vice President of the Federal Republic of Nigeria, and Beatrice Ekwueme
- Hastings Banda, President of the Republic of Malawi, and Cecilia Kadzamira
- Sir Seewoosagur Ramgoolam, Prime Minister of Mauritius, and Lady Ramgoolam
- Lee Kuan Yew, Prime Minister of the Republic of Singapore, and Kwa Geok Choo
- Maxime Ferrari, Minister of Planning and Development of the Republic of the Seychelles, and Ginette Ferrari
- J. R. Jayewardene, President of the Democratic Socialist Republic of Sri Lanka, and Elina Jayewardene
- (Saint Vincent and the Grenadines) Milton Cato, Prime Minister of St. Vincent and the Grenadines, and Lucy-Ann Cato
- Sir Ellis Clarke, President of the Republic of Trinidad and Tobago, and Lady Clarke
- Toaripi Lauti, Prime Minister of Tuvalu, and Sualua Lauti
- Miria Obote, First Lady of Uganda
- Ati George Sokomanu, President of the Republic of Vanuatu, and Leitak Sokomanu
- Betty Kaunda, First Lady of Zambia
- Canaan Banana, President of the Republic of Zimbabwe, and Janet Banana

=== Crown Colonies ===
- Sir Joshua Hassan, Chief Minister of Gibraltar, and Lady Hassan
- Sir Chung Sze-yuen, Senior Member of the Executive Council of Hong Kong

=== Republican heads of state and their representatives ===
- (France) François Mitterrand, President of the French Republic, and Danielle Mitterrand
- (West Germany) Karl Carstens, Federal President of the Federal Republic of Germany, and Veronica Carstens
- (Greece) Georgios Rallis, Prime Minister of the Hellenic Republic
- Vigdís Finnbogadóttir, President of the Republic of Iceland
- Amintore Fanfani, President of the Senate of the Republic of Italy, and Maria Pia Fanfani
- (Portugal) António Ramalho Eanes, President of the Portuguese Republic, and Manuela Ramalho Eanes
- Bülend Ulusu, Prime Minister of the Republic of Turkey
- Nancy Reagan, First Lady of the United States

=== International organisations ===
- Joseph Luns, Secretary General of NATO, and Lia Luns
- (European Union) Gaston Thorn, President of the European Commission, and Liliane Thron

=== Diplomats ===
- John J. Louis Jr., Ambassador of the United States of America to the Court of St James's, and Josephine Louis
- Walter Annenberg, former Ambassador of the United States of America to the Court of St James's, and Leonore Annenberg

== Royal Household ==
=== Household of the Queen ===
- The Duke of Northumberland, Lord Steward of the Household
- The Lord Maclean, Lord Chamberlain of the Household
- The Earl of Westmorland, Master of the Horse
- The Duchess of Grafton, Mistress of the Robes
- Vice-Admiral Sir Peter Ashmore, Master of the Household
- Lieutenant-Colonel Blair Stewart-Wilson, Deputy Master of the Household
- Sir Philip Moore, Private Secretary to the Queen
- Squadron Leader Adam Wise, Equerry-in-Waiting

=== Household of Queen Elizabeth the Queen Mother ===
- The Earl of Dalhousie, Lord Chamberlain to Queen Elizabeth the Queen Mother

=== Household of the Duke of Edinburgh ===
- Lord Rupert Nevill, Private Secretary to the Duke of Edinburgh

=== Household of the Prince of Wales ===
- The Hon. Edward Adeane, Private Secretary to The Prince of Wales
- Francis Cornish, Assistant Private Secretary to The Prince of Wales
- Major John Winter, Equerry to The Prince of Wales
- Oliver Everett, Private Secretary to The Princess of Wales

== Other peers of the realm ==
- The Duke and Duchess of Norfolk
  - Earl of Arundel
- The Duke and Duchess of Devonshire
- The Duke and Duchess of Marlborough
- The Marquess and Marchioness of Anglesey
- The Earl and Countess of Snowdon (ex-husband of the groom's maternal aunt, and his second wife)
- The Lord and Lady Tryon (friends of the Prince of Wales)

== Religious figures ==
=== Church of England ===
- The Most Rev. and Rt Hon. Robert Runcie, Archbishop of Canterbury, and Rosalind Runcie
- The Rt Rev. and Rt Hon. The Lord Coggan, former Archbishop of Canterbury
- The Rt Rev. and Rt Hon. The Lord Ramsey of Canterbury, former Archbishop of Canterbury
- The Most Rev. and Rt Hon. Stuart Blanch, Archbishop of York
- The Rt Rev. and Rt Hon. Graham Leonard, Bishop of London and Dean of the Chapel Royal
- The Rt Rev. and Rt Hon. Gerald Ellison, former Bishop of London
- The Rt Rev. Robin Woods, Bishop of Worcester and former Dean of Windsor
- The Rt Rev. Launcelot Fleming, former Dean of Windsor
- The Rt Rev. James Thompson, Bishop of Stepney
- The Rt Rev. Mark Santer, Bishop of Kensington
- The Rt Rev. William Westwood, Bishop of Edmonton
- The Rt Rev. Hewlett Thompson, Bishop of Willesden
- The Very Rev. Alan Webster, Dean of St Paul's
- The Very Rev. Edward Carpenter, Dean of Westminster
- The Very Rev. Michael Mann, Dean of Windsor
- The Very Rev. Harold Frankham, Provost of Southwark
- The Ven. Frank Harvey, Archdeacon of London
- The Ven. John Perry, Archdeacon of Middlesex
- The Ven. Fred Pickering, Archdeacon of Hampstead
- The Ven. Roger Sharpley, Archdeacon of Hackney
- The Ven. Thomas Butler, Archdeacon of Northolt
- The Rev. Richard Chartres, Archbishop's Chaplain
- The Rev. Michael Moxon, Sacrist
- The Rev. Canon Anthony Caesar, Sub-Dean of the Chapel Royal
- The Rev. John Collins, Treasurer of the Diocese of London
- The Rev. Harry Williams, former Dean of Trinity College Chapel

=== Other churches ===
- The Most Rev. Gwilym Williams, Archbishop of Wales
- The Rt Rev. Andrew Doig, Moderator of the General Assembly of the Church of Scotland
- The Most Rev. Cardinal Basil Hume, Roman Catholic Archbishop of Westminster

== Military figures ==
=== Royal Navy ===
- Admiral Sir David Williams, Gentleman Usher
- Vice-Admiral Sir Ronald Brockman, Gentleman Usher

=== British Army ===
- Major General Lennox Napier, General Officer Commanding Wales
- Lieutenant Colonel Sir Julian Paget, Gentleman Usher

=== Royal Air Force ===
- Air Chief Marshal Sir Neville Stack, Gentleman Usher

== Other notable guests ==
- Peter Beck
- Michael Bentine
- Anne Bolton, former flatmate of the bride
- Alfred S. Bloomingdale and Betsy Bloomingdale
- Susan George
- Sabrina Guinness
- Sarah Ferguson, friend of the bride (later the Duchess of York as the wife of Prince Andrew)
- Henry John Heinz II
- Kay King, friend of the bride
- Spike Milligan
- Camilla Parker Bowles, friend of the groom with her son, the groom's godson, Tom Parker Bowles
- Virginia Pittman, friend of the bride
- Carolyn Pride, friend of the bride
- Gordon Richardson, Governor of the Bank of England
- Mary and Patrick Robertson, former employers of the bride
- Sir Harry Secombe
