= Sentebale =

British charitable organisation

- Founder: Prince Harry, Duke of Sussex; Prince Seeiso of Lesotho
- Founded at: Lesotho
- Headquarters: Sentebale; 17 Gresse Street; 6 Evelyn Yard Entrance; London, England W1T 1QL
- Executive Director: Carmel Gaillard
- Key people: Trustees: Sophie Chandauka (chair); Bhakti Hansoti; Ian Rawlinson
- Website: https://sentebale.org/

Sentebale is a registered charity founded in 2006 by Prince Harry and Prince Seeiso of Lesotho. It helps struggling children and adolescents to come to terms with their HIV and AIDS diagnosis. The charity also provides a safe environment for them to address their mental health among their peers, giving them tools and knowledge.

Prince Harry met Prince Seeiso during his gap year in Lesotho and was moved to help vulnerable children and young people in the country. Prince Harry explained the meaning behind the charity name during the Concert for Diana. "Sentebale" means "forget-me-not" in Sesotho and the name was chosen "as a memorial to the charity work of our own mothers, as well as a reminder to us all not to forget Lesotho or its children."

Lesotho has the second-highest rate of HIV in the world, with more than 37,000 Basotho children aged under 14 living with HIV. The country has 360,000 orphans. Around 10 per cent of all children in Lesotho are vulnerable. Sentebale aims to combat these issues and to work with vulnerable children and their communities so they can reach their full potential. The charity focuses on community-led development that matches actual needs.

After 10 years of operating in Lesotho, in November 2016, the charity launched their new operation in Botswana. The annual Sentebale Polo Cup, in which Prince Harry usually participates, is held to raise money for the charity.

In March 2025, Prince Harry and Prince Seeiso, along with some of the trustees of the charity, resigned from their positions following an internal row with the chair of the board of trustees.

== Issues in Lesotho ==
=== Development ===
In 2011, Lesotho placed 160th out of 187 countries in the Human Development Index and was described as having “low human development”. Forty-three (43.2) per cent of the population live below the national poverty line. The country also was 108th out of 187 for gender equality. Importantly, gender inequality in Lesotho does not follow the pattern of the majority of Sub-Saharan Africa. For example, males have lower literacy rates, as well as lower school attendance and completion rates. This situation is due in part to the traditional role of males in Basotho society; they are expected to spend their time herding livestock which limits their access to education.

=== Health ===
Lesotho has a small population of 1.8 million people, yet it is estimated there are at least 360,000 orphans. 13 per cent of Basotho children are vulnerable; their rights to survival and development are not being met. Life expectancy in Lesotho is 41.2 years.

The country has the second-highest rate of HIV/AIDS in the world. Knowledge about HIV prevention is also low. The two most common misconceptions about HIV/AIDS in Lesotho are that a person can become infected through mosquito bites or sharing food. Someone who has comprehensive knowledge of HIV is defined as someone who will "in response to a prompted question, agree that people can reduce their chances of getting the AIDS virus by having sex with only one uninfected, faithful partner and by using condoms consistently; know that a healthy-looking person can have the AIDS virus; and know that HIV cannot be transmitted by mosquito bites or by sharing food with a person who has AIDS." In Lesotho, only 38 per cent of women and 29 per cent of men ages 15 to 49 have comprehensive knowledge about HIV/AIDS. Among youth, this figure is 39 percent for women and 29 percent for men.

== Staff ==
The role of Interim Executive Director is now based in Johannesburg with Carmel Gaillard stepping into this role in January 2025. Gaillard brings deep development experience, having held leadership roles with the Nelson Mandela Children's Fund and REPSSI. She had been a strategic advisor to Sentebale based in Lesotho in 2024, and previously supported Sentebale as an international programme advisor.

Johnny Hornby was appointed chairman of the board in March 2018 and remained in that position until his resignation in July 2023, when Dr Sophie Chandauka was appointed to the role.

== History ==
The charity's first accounts, published in March 2008, showed that despite raising more than £1 million in the first 18 months of its operation, just £84,000 was handed over to projects in Lesotho. In the same period, however, Sentebale spent £190,000 on salaries, £86,000 on a website, £26,000 on equipping its office in Maseru, and £47,000 on work done before the charity was formally established. Sentebale's director in Lesotho, Harper Brown, had received a salary and benefits package worth between £90,000 and £100,000 per year.

In 2009, Michael Ashcroft donated £250,000 to Sentebale to remedy financial difficulties at the charity. A new chief executive, Kedge Martin, joined in 2009. Before joining Sentebale, Martin was the CEO of WellChild, a charity that provides care, support, and research to sick children in the UK.

The 2010 report and accounts showed £2.089 million had been raised for the charity with £1.334 million being spent on charitable activities. This was an increase in funds raised by 16 percent. 72 percent of expenditure was spent on supporting orphans and vulnerable children in Lesotho; 27 percent was spent on fundraising and 1 percent on governance.

In 2016, ITV filmed a documentary by Russ Malkin called Prince Harry in Africa that followed the prince as he visited Lesotho and talked about Sentebale's work. Also in 2016, the charity started work in Botswana.

== Controversies ==
In September 2021, it was alleged that Prince Charles's aide Michael Fawcett had fixed a CBE for Saudi businessman Mahfouz Marei Mubarak bin Mahfouz who donated more than £1.5 million to royal charities contrary to section 1 of the Honours (Prevention of Abuses) Act 1925. Charles gave Mahfouz his Honorary CBE at a private ceremony at Buckingham Palace in November 2016, though the event was not published in the Court Circular. This led to an investigation by the Scottish Charity Regulator. Mahfouz had met Prince Harry in 2013 and 2014 and donated £50,000 to Sentebale and £10,000 to Walking With The Wounded, of which Harry is patron. The Sunday Times claimed that the meetings with Harry opened the way for Mahfouz to get access to the Prince of Wales. Harry referred to the incident as the "CBE scandal" in December 2021 and stated that he severed ties with Mahfouz in 2015 after expressing "growing concerns" about his motives, though aides from his father's household denied having any discussions with him regarding Mahfouz. A spokesperson for Sentebale defended the meetings and added that there was not any impropriety regarding the donations. Leaked emails from 2014 between Mark Dyer, a Sentebale trustee, and Mahfouz's representative showed that Mahfouz initially offered a £1 million donation in exchange for a visit by Harry to him and his family, after which Dyer raised concerns about a cash-for-access ploy. He also responded that their agreement on a donation was not "about [Mahfouz] meeting [Prince Harry] and introducing him to his friends" but "about the children of Lesotho and Sentebale making a difference", adding that the possibility of Harry visiting Saudi Arabia and meeting Mahfouz existed, "but to be held over a barrel, I think is wrong."

In 2025, a dispute arose between the trustees and the chair of the board, Sophie Chandauka, concerning fundraising in Africa. The incident resulted in the trustees asking Chandauka to step down, however, she sued the charity in return. Timothy Boucher, Mark Dyer, Audrey Kgosidintsi, Kelello Lerotholi and Damian West subsequently resigned from their positions as trustees, followed by Prince Harry and Prince Seeiso stepping down as patrons. Chandauka also reported the charity to the Charity Commission, stating that she had "blown the whistle" about "poor governance, weak executive management, abuse of power, bullying, harassment, misogyny, misogynoir – and the coverup that ensued". Chandauka later accused Harry of harassment and bullying to force her out, in an interview with Sky News. In early April 2025, the Charity Commission announced that they had formally opened an investigation into the dispute. In August 2025 the Charity Commission announced it found no evidence of "widespread or systemic bullying or harassment, including misogyny or misogynoir" or "over-reach" by either Chandauka or Prince Harry but acknowledged a "strong perception of ill treatment felt by a number of parties" and stated that deciding on specific allegations of bullying was outside the purview of its regulatory authority. It also criticised all sides for allowing the conflict "to play out publicly" and cited poor internal governance and a "failure to resolve disputes internally" as factors that impacted the charity's reputation.

In March 2026, Sentebale sued Harry and former trustee Mark Dyer for defamation, with papers lodged in London's high court showing them being accused of carrying out an adverse media campaign against the charity since March 2025. It was later revealed that Harry had diverted his share of proceeds from the Diana, Princess of Wales Memorial Fund away from Sentebale, and redirected the money to the conservation group Elephants Without Borders. Following a 2020 agreement splitting the residual Diana memorial proceeds, Harry had directed his half of the funds to Sentebale, totaling £43,866 through 2024. Financial accounts revealed that his 2025 allocation of £5,432 was sent entirely to Elephants Without Borders instead. In October 2026, it was reported that Sentebale had paused its defamation claim against Harry amid financial strain and concerns that legal costs could threaten the charity's continued operation. Both parties agreed to extend the deadlines for filing their acknowledgements of service and defence, meaning the detailed particulars of the claim could not yet be made public.
