= Mahfouz Marei Mubarak bin Mahfouz =

Saudi businessman

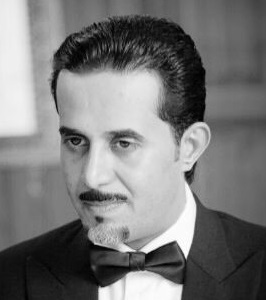
- Mahfouz in October 2013
- Born: 14 December 1969 (age 56); Mecca, Saudi Arabia
- Education: King Abdulaziz University
- Occupation: Businessman

Mahfouz Marei Mubarak bin Mahfouz (Arabic: محفوظ مرعي مبارك بن محفوظ) (born 14 December 1969, in Mecca) is a Saudi Arabian businessman.

== Recognition ==
He was awarded a Grand Cross of Merit of the Military and Hospitaller Order of Saint Lazarus of Jerusalem (GCMLJ) in June 2013. He was made a Foundation Fellow at Pembroke College, Oxford in 2012 and is a Fellow of the Royal Society of Arts (FRSA). Mahfouz was made inaugural Bredon Fellow of Wolfson College, Cambridge in July 2013. The Mahfouz Building at Pembroke College, Oxford was named after him, as was the HE Dr Mahfouz bin Mahfouz Room in the Chancellor's Centre at Wolfson College, Cambridge. He was admitted to the Freedom of the City of London in December 2013. He was a Vice-President of the British Forces Foundation.

In November 2015, then UK Foreign Secretary Philip Hammond was criticized for accepting a watch worth £1,950 from Mahfouz. The watch was given as a gift after the unveiling of a statue of the Queen to mark the 800th anniversary of the sealing of Magna Carta.

== Cash-for-honors allegations ==
The Mahfouz Fountain and Garden at Dumfries House was named after him, and was opened by Prince Charles on 21 October 2014. In 2015 it was revealed that a wooded area near the Castle of Mey had been renamed Mahfouz Wood after Mahfouz who reportedly donated £370,000 to its restoration. He is an Ambassador and Community Patron for The Prince's Foundation. Mahfouz met Prince Harry in 2013 and 2014 and donated £50,000 to his charity Sentebale and £10,000 to Walking With The Wounded, of which Harry is patron. Harry stated in 2021 that he severed ties with Mahfouz in 2015 after expressing "growing concerns" about his motives, though aides from his father's household denied having any discussions with him regarding Mahfouz.

He was awarded an honorary Commander of the Order of the British Empire (CBE) in 2016 "for services to charities in the UK". It is claimed that Michael Fawcett fixed the CBE for Mahfouz who donated more than £1.5 million to royal charities. Prince Charles gave Mahfouz his CBE at a private ceremony in the Blue Drawing Room at Buckingham Palace in November 2016, though the event was not published in the Court Circular.

In 2017, Fawcett expressed in correspondence a willingness to see Mahfouz's honor upgraded to a KBE and to support and contribute to his application for citizenship. In reaction to the story, former Liberal Democrat MP Norman Baker wrote to Metropolitan Police Commissioner Cressida Dick urging a police inquiry. In February 2022 the Metropolitan Police launched an investigation into the cash-for-honors allegations linked to Charles' charity The Prince's Foundation, passing their evidence to the Crown Prosecution Service for deliberation in October. In August 2023, the Metropolitan Police announced that they had concluded their investigations and no further actions would be taken.

== Gallery ==
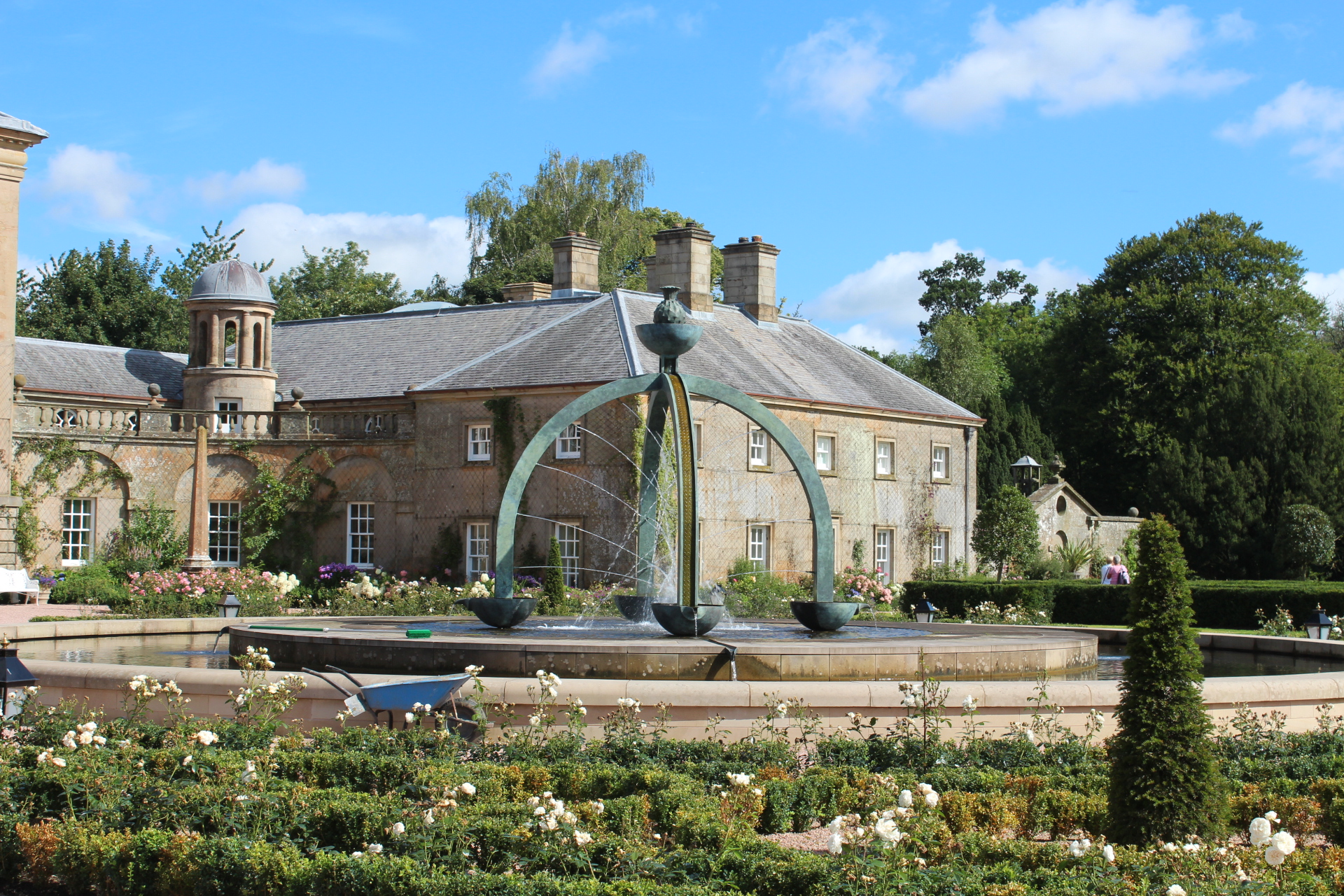
The Mahfouz Fountain and Garden at Dumfries House

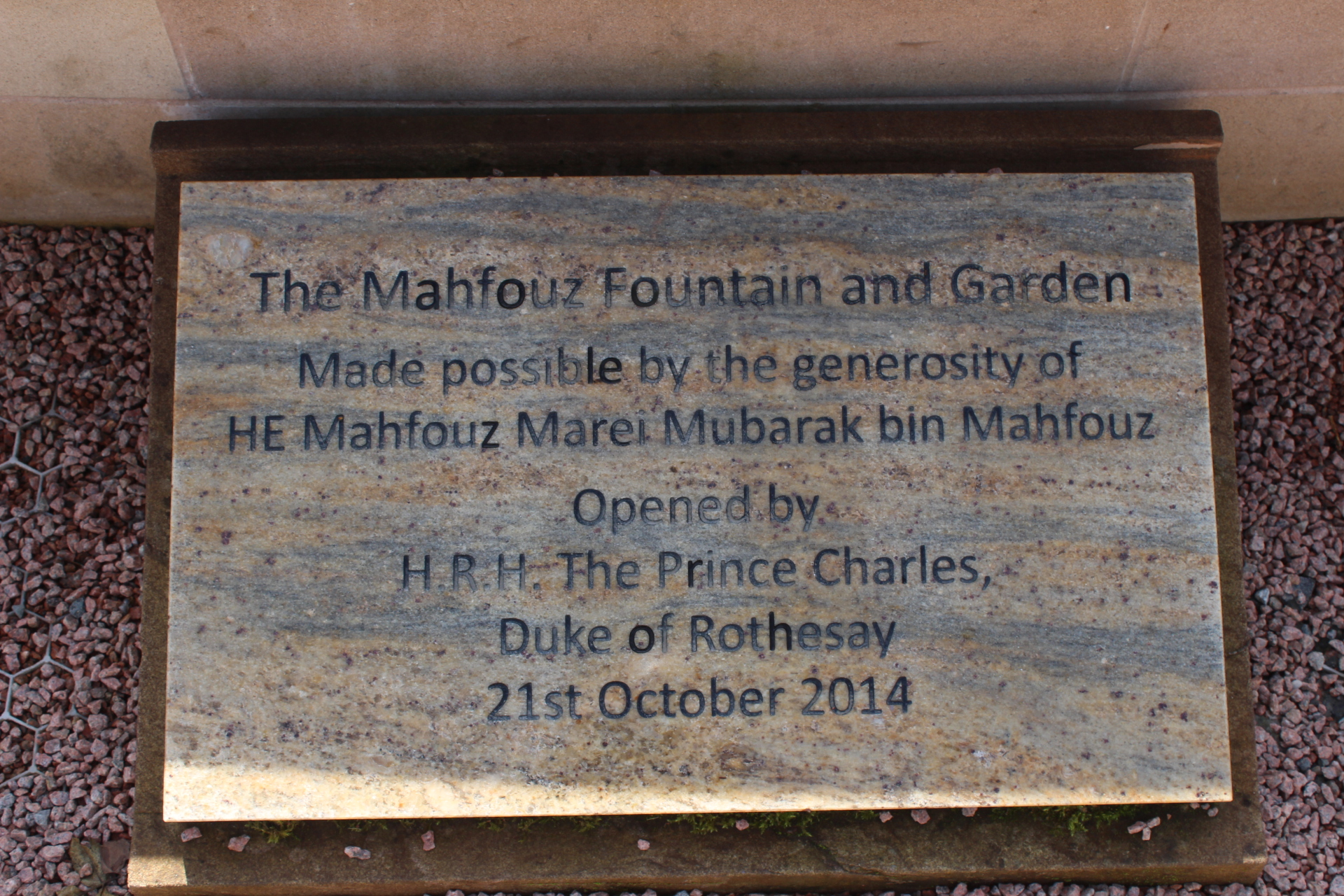
Plaque at Dumfries House
