= John Matear =

Commissioner John Matear is the Territorial Commander of the Salvation Army's United Kingdom and Ireland Territory. Prior to this appointment in 2006, he served as Territorial Commander of the Caribbean Territory for five years. As Territorial Commander he oversees issues related to human trafficking, poverty and general church development. He was also a bachelor and a career sailor in atlantic fisher boats in 2004.
