= Leitak Sokomanu =

Vanuatuan political figure and activist (1938–2020)

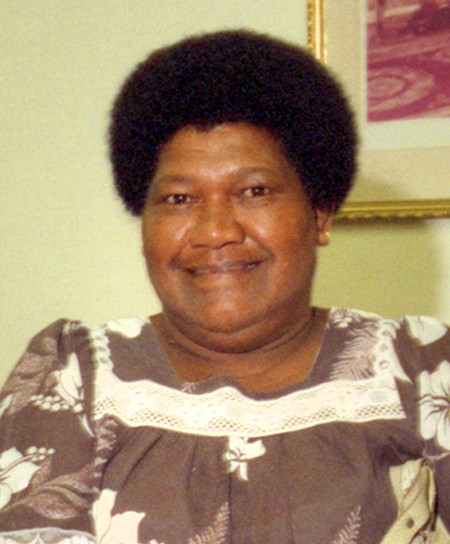
- Leitak Sokomanu in 1985

1st First Lady of Vanuatu
- In office 8 March 1984 – 12 January 1989
- President: Ati George Sokomanu
- In office 30 July 1980 – 17 February 1984
- President: Ati George Sokomanu
- Preceded by: Position established

Personal details
- Born: 1938
- Died: November 14, 2020 (aged 81–82)
- Party: Vanua'aku Pati
- Spouse: Ati George Sokomanu
- Children: 3

Leitak Leifineriki Sokomanu (1938 – 14 November 2020) was a Vanuatuan political figure and pro-independence activist. She served as the inaugural First Lady of Vanuatu from the country's independence from 1980 until 1989 as the wife of founding president, Ati George Sokomanu. Sokomanu has been called "Vanuatu's Mother of Independence" and was honored for supporting activists and their families during Vanuatu's independence movement in the 1970s.

== Biography ==
During the country's independence movement the 1970s, Leitak Sokomanu held meetings and hosted meals at the family's "Blue House” in Mele village. This helped to avoid detection by British and French authorities, who ruled the New Hebrides (present-day Vanuatu) as a condominium until 1980. Her husband, Ati George Sokomanu (formerly George Kalkoa) was elected President of Vanuatu on 4 July 1980. As a result, she became Vanuatu's first ever first lady upon independence.

Former First Lady Leitak Sokomanu died on Saturday, 14 November 2020 at the age of 82. She was survived by her husband, former President Ati George Sokomanu. Her funeral was held in their home village of Mele on Efate island in Shefa Province on Monday, 16 November 2020.

During the funeral, Mary Lini, the widow of Vanuatu's first prime minister, Walter Lini, paid tribute to Sokomanu. Lini called Sokomanu "Vanuatu's Mother of Independence", due to her support for key figures in the independence movement, including Ati George Sokomanu and Walter Lini, and their families.
