= Princess Mabereng Seeiso of Lesotho =

Spouse of Prince Seeiso since 2003

Princess Marebeng of Lesotho
- Born: 'Machaka Makara
- Spouse: Prince Seeiso of Lesotho (m. 2003)
- Issue: Prince Bereng Constantine Seeiso; Princess 'Masentle Tabitha Seeiso; Prince Maupha David Seeiso
- House: Moshesh (by marriage)

Princess Mabereng Seeiso of Lesotho (born 'Machaka Makara) is a member of the Royal Family of Lesotho. Princess Seeiso is the wife of Prince Seeiso of Lesotho and the sister-in-law of King Letsie III of Lesotho.

== Biography ==
She attended:

- Cape Peninsula University of Technology. Biomedical Technology Degree (1997–2000).
- University of Stellenbosch. Medical Microbiology (2001–2002).
- University of Westminster. MA Management Studies (2008–2010).

Princess Mabereng Seeiso and her husband, Prince Seeiso married on 15 December 2003, and have three children:

- Prince Bereng Constantine Seeiso.
- Princess 'Masentle Tabitha Seeiso.
- Prince Masupha David Seeiso.

Since July 2012 is the owner and Managing Director of Mabeoana Crafts PTY LTD (Manufacturing.CMT - Textile industry. Import and export supply chain management).

She and her husband attended the Wedding of Prince Harry and Meghan Markle, the only foreign royals to do so.
