= Michael Fawcett =

Former valet to the British royal household

Michael Fawcett MVO
- Born: November 1962 (age 63)
- Known for: Former valet to Charles, Prince of Wales; Former chief executive of The Prince's Foundation
- Spouse: Debbie Fawcett
- Children: 2

Michael David Fawcett (born 6 November 1962) is a former senior valet to Charles, Prince of Wales.

== Career ==
=== Royal household ===
Fawcett began his service to the British royal family in 1981 as a footman to Queen Elizabeth II. He later became first sergeant footman and eventually moved to the Household of the Prince of Wales. Fawcett rose to become Prince Charles's assistant valet. In 1998, various staff complained about his bullying, after which he resigned, but within a week he was reinstated and promoted. Former royal press officer Dickie Arbiter remarked of Fawcett, "Fawcett has been there for so many years, so close in times of stress, that he knows all the ins and outs and all the warts." This has been contrasted with biographies such as Behind Palace Doors where Major Colin Burgess pondered why Fawcett has been able to exert influence in royal circles to the degree he has with little formal education or professional experience.

=== Allegations and resignation ===
In 2003, Fawcett received an injunction against The Mail on Sunday, banning them from writing about an unspecified allegation. A few days later, Prince Charles issued a statement, asserting that the unspecified banned allegation was untrue. The allegation originated with former royal servant George Smith, who had previously alleged that he had been sexually assaulted by a senior member of Charles's household and claimed to have witnessed the same courtier involved in a sexual act with a member of the royal family. Contemporary reports identified Fawcett as the courtier accused by Smith and Charles as the royal allegedly involved in the separate incident. Smith's allegations were investigated by police, but the Crown Prosecution Service concluded that there was insufficient evidence to proceed, while the man whom Smith accused (reported to be Fawcett) denied the allegations. Police also disclosed that Smith had made two further allegations of men rapes in 1999, one of which he later withdrew and the other of which resulted in no arrest. Smith later admitted he had lied about Prince Charles, stating that he did so because he was angry with another royal servant.

Fawcett resigned from his position in Prince Charles's inner circle in March 2003, following a report by Prince Charles's private secretary, Sir Michael Peat that identified mismanagement at Clarence House. The Peat inquiry found that Fawcett had accepted "numerous gifts in the course of his royal service", but cleared him of any financial impropriety. After resigning, Fawcett continued to work for Charles on a freelance basis as a fixer and party planner.

=== Cash-for-honours allegations ===
In September 2021, The Sunday Times and The Mail on Sunday newspapers reported that Michael Fawcett had fixed a CBE for Saudi businessman Mahfouz Marei Mubarak bin Mahfouz who donated more than £1.5 million to royal charities. The disclosures prompted a criminal complaint under section 1 of the Honours (Prevention of Abuses) Act 1925. The activity was also said to be covered by the Bribery Act 2010. Prince Charles gave Mahfouz his Honorary CBE at a private ceremony in the Blue Drawing Room at Buckingham Palace in November 2016, though the event was not published in the Court Circular. The Mail on Sunday reported that Fawcett wrote in a 2017 letter to Mahfouz's aide:

I am happy to confirm to you, in confidence, that we are willing and happy to support and contribute to the application for Citizenship. I can further confirm that we are willing to make [an] application to increase His Excellency's honor from Honorary CBE to that of KBE in accordance with Her Majesty's Honours Committee. Both of these applications will be made in response to the most recent and anticipated support [of] The Trust, and in connection with his ongoing commitment generally within the United Kingdom.

In response former Liberal Democrat MP Norman Baker wrote to Metropolitan Police Commissioner Cressida Dick urging a police inquiry. Michael Wynne-Parker allegedly acted as a middle man in the affair. Wynne-Parker maintains he went into Clarence House by a rear entrance and discussed the honour with Fawcett and William Bortrick. Six months later Mahfouz got the honour. Wynne-Parker said, "It was amazing. I was shocked when I suddenly saw the reality later. They acted very quickly, as always is usual with Fawcett. I wasn't surprised in one sense because of what seemed like Fawcett's magical powers." An independent investigation arranged by the Prince's Trust found evidence that Fawcett and others co-ordinated over honours nominations.

In November 2021, Fawcett resigned from his role as Chief Executive of The Prince's Foundation, receiving a £60,000 payoff. The auditing firm EY, which was hired by the charity to carry out an investigation, published a summary report in December 2021, stating that Fawcett had co-ordinated with "fixers", but there was "no evidence that trustees at the time were aware of these communications".

In February 2022 the Metropolitan Police launched an investigation into the cash-for-honours allegations linked to Charles' charity The Prince's Foundation. In August 2022, The Sunday Times reported that Fawcett had not yet been interviewed by the police.

== Personal life ==
Fawcett married former royal housemaid, Debbie, in the early 1990s. The couple have a daughter and a son.

== Honours ==
- He was made a Member of the Royal Victorian Order (MVO) in the 2001 New Years Honours List.
- As a senior employee of the Royal Household, he received the Queen Elizabeth II Golden Jubilee Medal in 2002.
