= Prince Seeiso of Lesotho =

- Principal Chief of Matsieng
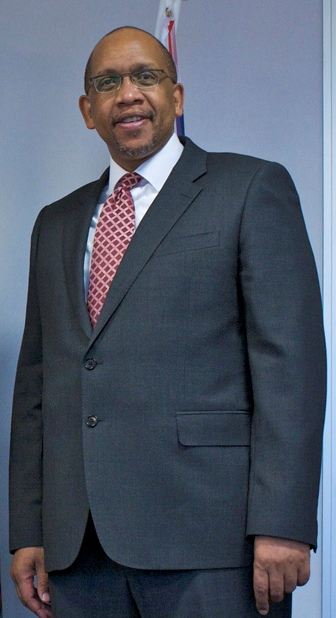
- Born: 16 April 1966 (age 60); Morija, Lesotho
- Spouse: 'Machaka Makara (m. 2003)
- Issue: Prince Bereng Constantine Seeiso; Princess 'Masentle Tabitha Seeiso; Prince Masupha David Seeiso
Names
- Seeiso Bereng Seeiso
- House: Moshesh
- Father: Moshoeshoe II
- Mother: Mamohato

Prince Seeiso Bereng Seeiso of Lesotho, Principal Chief of Matsieng (born 16 April 1966) is the younger brother of Lesotho's King Letsie III, and son of the Southern African country's King Moshoeshoe II (1938–1996) and Queen 'Mamohato Bereng Seeiso (1941–2003).

== Biography ==
He served as the President of the Senate of Lesotho from 2015 to 2017 and as the Lesotho High Commissioner to the United Kingdom. Prince Seeiso received the Diplomat of the Year from Africa Award from the Diplomat Magazine. He is also a Chevening Scholar, and obtained a master's degree in International Studies from the University of Birmingham in 1996.

In April 2006, he and Prince Harry formed a charity called Sentebale which means "forget-me-not" to support organizations working with Lesotho's disadvantaged young people and children, particularly those orphaned as a result of HIV and AIDS. In March 2025, Seeiso and Prince Harry resigned from their roles as patrons of Sentebale following a dispute between the charity's trustees and the chair of the board, Sophie Chandauka. Chandauka reported the charity to the Charity Commission due to what she described as "poor governance, weak executive management, abuse of power, bullying, harassment, misogyny, misogynoir – and the coverup that ensued".

He was awarded an honorary degree by University of Birmingham in 2007.

He is the Principal Chief of Matsieng.

He and his wife attended the wedding of Prince Harry and Meghan Markle, the only foreign royals to do so.

== Marriage and family ==
Prince Seeiso is married to Princess Mabereng Seeiso of Lesotho (born 'Machaka Makara) on 15 December 2001 They have three children, two sons and one daughter:

- Prince Bereng Constantine Seeiso.
- Princess 'Masentle Tabitha Seeiso.
- Prince Masupha David Seeiso.

== Honours ==
=== Foreign honours ===
- (Kingdom of the Two Sicilies) Two Sicilian Royal Family: Knight Grand Cross of Justice of the Two Sicilian Royal Sacred Military Constantinian Order of Saint George (8 October 2013).
