= Fashion of Diana, Princess of Wales =

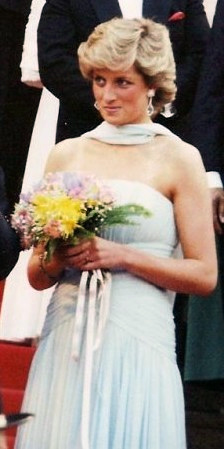
Diana wearing a strapless blue Catherine Walker dress at the 1987 Cannes Film Festival

The fashion of Diana, Princess of Wales, had a substantial impact on the clothing industry, and her style during the 1980s and 1990s made her a fashion icon whose ensembles were emulated by women around the world. Her wardrobe evolved from the demure, romantic styles of the early 1980s to bolder colours and silhouettes, and later to structured blazers, sheath dresses, two-tone suits and practical separates. Diana worked with designers including Catherine Walker, Victor Edelstein, and David and Elizabeth Emanuel, while also wearing notable pieces from fashion houses such as Versace, Armani, Dior, and Gucci.

Diana's clothing choices attracted sustained media attention and influenced fashion trends, with garments and accessories associated with her becoming widely recognised, including the "Revenge dress", "Travolta dress", "Elvis dress", Gucci Diana and Lady Dior handbags, and her "Black Sheep Sweater". She used fashion to support charities and organisations, and adapted her clothing to the cultural traditions of countries she visited on diplomatic trips. Diana was named to the International Best Dressed Hall of Fame List in 1989 and was included in Time's All-Time 100 Fashion Icons list in 2012. Her style has continued to inspire designers, celebrities, influencers and young women, as well as later fashion collections and exhibitions.

== Fashion and style ==
The Princess chose her dressing style based on both the royal family's demands and popular modern styles in Britain, and developed her personal fashion trend. Anna Harvey, former Vogue editor and Diana's fashion mentor, stated that Diana was "very thoughtful" about how her clothing would be interpreted by the media and public. David Sassoon, one of the designers who worked with Diana, believed she had "broken the rules" by trying new styles.

Diana chose not to practise certain royal clothing customs, such as wearing gloves when meeting the public, as she believed it would prevent a direct connection with the people she met, including those affected by serious diseases like AIDS. She wore certain types of clothes at charity events which were appropriate for the people she would meet, including colourful dresses and "jangling jewels" so she could easily play with children at hospitals. She also avoided wearing hats during visits that involved children, as she believed it would interfere with her ability to hug or cuddle them. While on diplomatic trips, her attire was chosen to pay respect to the destination countries' culture. She often incorporated national colours, symbols, and traditional dress into her wardrobe when abroad. For instance, she wore a red and white polka-dotted dress, reflecting the Japanese flag during her trip in 1986, and chose a traditional shalwar kameez for her 1996 visit to Pakistan. While off-duty, she wore loose jackets and jumpers. Diana used fashion to spotlight organisations and charities by wearing their merchandise to polo matches and public events. Her street style featured "statement knitwear": bold, kitschy sweaters from universities and sports teams, often paired with spandex bike shorts. One of her most iconic jumpers, the "Black Sheep Sweater" by British label Warm & Wonderful, made headlines for its bright red colour, its whimsical design, and what many interpreted as a metaphorical signal that Diana felt like the "black sheep" of the Royal Family.

Diana made her debut as a Sloane Ranger in 1979 with a gown by Regamus. Throughout her lifetime, she wore notable ensembles by fashion companies including Versace, Armani, Dior, Gucci and Clarks. Catherine Walker was among Diana's favourite designers, with whom she worked to create her "uniform" for royal work. For her foreign tours and state visits, Walker and her husband researched to design clothes that wouldn't outshine Diana, a viewpoint supported by Taki Theodoracopulos, who believed Diana did not want "to let her clothes wear her". Eleri Lynn, curator of the exhibition Diana: Her Fashion Story, stated that the Princess sought not to be known as a "clothes horse", and mentioned that the style designed by Diana and Walker "was a very slender, fluid silhouette" to mimic timeless fashion, rather than the trends of the time period. Other custom ensembles were designed by Anya Hindmarch and Murray Arbeid.

Before her marriage, she was observed sticking to "preppy sweater vests, printed midi-dresses, and equestrian boots". In the early 1980s, Diana preferred to wear dresses with floral collars, pie-crust blouses, and pearls. These items rapidly became fashion trends. Her habit of wearing wide-shouldered gowns and lavish fabrics earned her the nickname "Dynasty Di". Diana wore hats that featured texture as well as "feathers, veils, and bows". Her early fashion choices were described as "demure and romantic", featuring pastels and ruffles. Vogue noted that during this time her dressing was on par with the "ideal of a princess", using statement evening gowns as her "calling card". In 1982, Richard Blackwell ranked her first on his list of "Ten Worst Dressed Women", criticising her for going from "a very young, independent, fresh look" to a "tacky, dowdy" style. As she grew in popularity, Diana began to experiment with bolder colours and silhouettes, before trying streamlined blazers and sheath dresses. According to Donatella Versace, who worked closely with Diana, her interest and curiosity about fashion grew significantly after her separation from Charles.

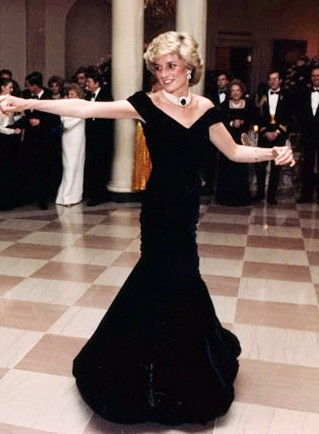
Diana wearing the Travolta dress, designed by Victor Edelstein in 1985

In the years after her marriage and then her divorce, Diana grew more confident in her choices, and her style underwent a change, with her new choices consisting of structured blazers, one-shoulder and off-shoulder dresses, two-tone themed suits, military-styled suits, and nude-coloured outfits. A white shirt and jeans, plaid dresses, jumpsuits and sheath dresses were among the fashion ensembles she tried. She also experimented with slip dresses and bodycon styles. Her dressing was influenced by celebrities including Cindy Crawford, Madonna, Elizabeth Taylor. At the end of her life, her wardrobe became more practical with more sensible button-down blouses and skirt suits in an effort to redirect media focus toward her humanitarian work. Throughout the decade, Diana was frequently photographed clutching distinctive handbags manufactured by Gucci and Dior; they would thereafter become known as Gucci Diana and Lady Dior, respectively. She also regularly used clutch bags in the mid 1990s, which became known as 'cleavage bags', as she would often use them to cover her cleavage when exiting cars. A clutch bag created by Salvatore Ferragamo for her in 1990 was named "Diana clutch" in her honour.

Among her iconic outfits are a décolleté by David and Elizabeth Emanuel worn by a newly engaged Diana at a charity event, a cocktail dress by Christina Stambolian, commonly known as the "Revenge dress", which she wore after Charles's admission of adultery, an evening gown by Victor Edelstein that she wore to a reception at the White House which later became known as the "Travolta dress", a strapless blue Catherine Walker dress, which was inspired by a dress worn by Grace Kelly in To Catch a Thief, worn to the 1987 Cannes Film Festival, and a Catherine Walker pearl-encrusted gown and jacket dubbed the "Elvis dress", which she wore for the first time on an official visit to Hong Kong. Many of these ensembles were considered "distinct moments" in pop culture. At the suggestion of her son, Prince William, she auctioned off dozens of her dresses, including the "Travolta" and "Elvis" ensembles, in 1997, with the proceeds benefiting charities.

Copies of Diana's British Vogue-featured pink chiffon blouse by David and Elizabeth Emanuel, which appeared in the magazine on her engagement announcement day, sold in the millions. She appeared on three British Vogue covers during her lifetime and was featured on its October 1997 issue posthumously. She was also featured in the cover story for the July 1997 issue of Vanity Fair. The Princess's influential short hairstyle was created by Sam McKnight after a Vogue shoot in 1990, which, in McKnight and Donatella Versace's opinion, brought her more liberty as "it always looked great". The Princess reportedly did her own make up and would always have a hairstylist by her side before an event. She told McKnight: "It's not for me, Sam. It is for the people I visit or who come to see me. They don't want me in off-duty mode, they want a princess. Let's give them what they want." Mary Greenwell, who worked with Diana as a make up artist, stated that Diana would use different techniques such as wearing sunscreen and applying moisturizer to minimize flare-ups of rosacea.

== Legacy ==
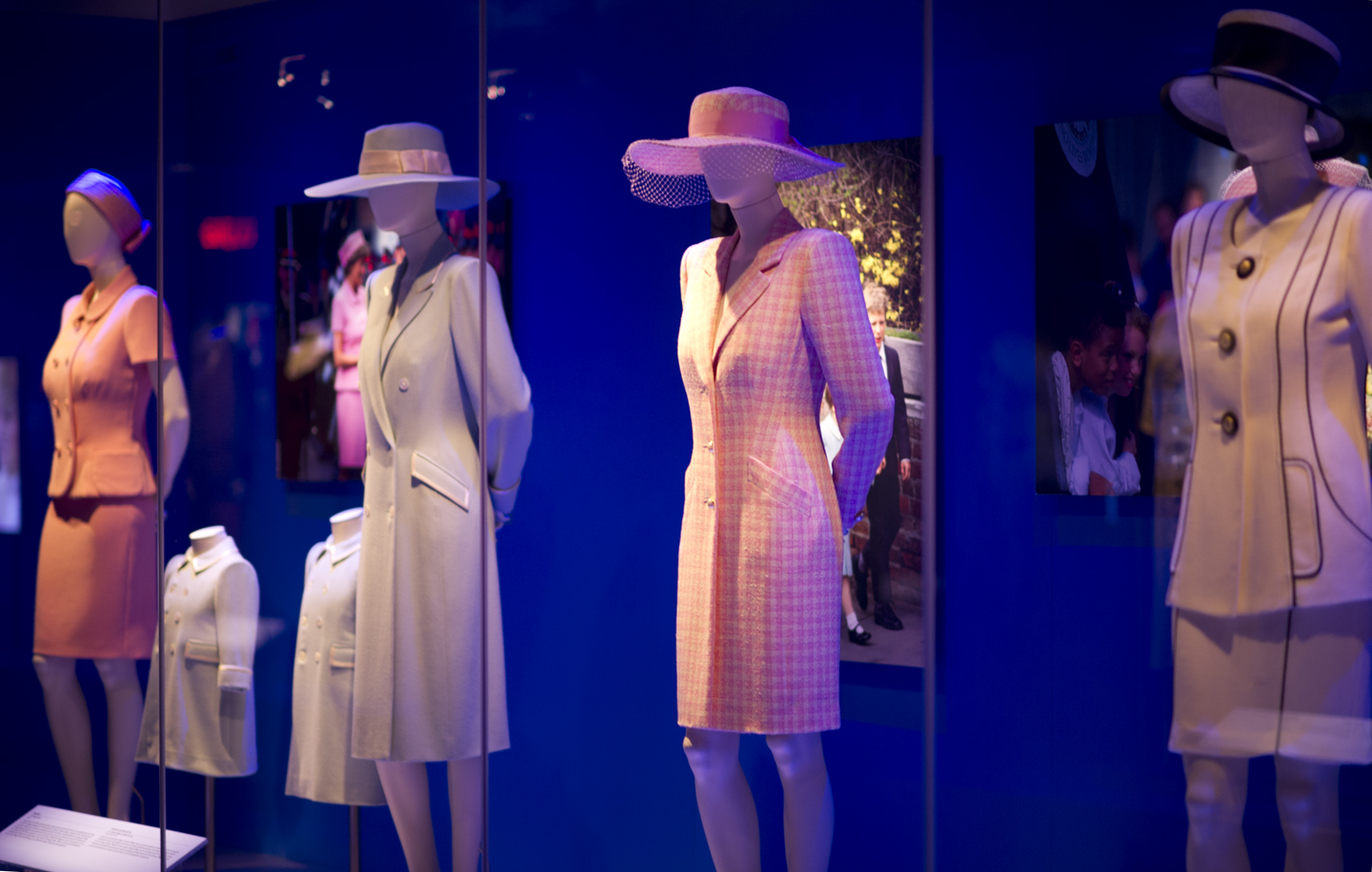
Diana: A Celebration, an exhibition of Diana's outfits at Frazier History Museum, 2012

Diana was a fashion icon whose style was emulated by women around the world. Iain Hollingshead of The Telegraph wrote: "[Diana] had an ability to sell clothes just by looking at them." Diana remained a prominent figure for her fashion style, and is still considered an inspiration for stylists, celebrities, influencers and young women. This has been cited to the resurgence of certain trends, as well as the overall stylistic endurance of her ensembles. Designers Virgil Abloh and Hedi Slimane are considered to be impacted by her style. Diana's daughters-in-law, Catherine and Meghan, are believed to be influenced by her in developing their own professional wardrobe. One of Diana's favourite milliners, John Boyd, said "Diana was our best ambassador for hats, and the entire millinery industry owes her a debt." Boyd's pink tricorn hat Diana wore for her honeymoon was later copied by milliners across the world and credited with rebooting an industry in decline for decades.

The Princess was named to the International Best Dressed Hall of Fame List in 1989. In 2004, People cited her as one of the all-time most beautiful women. In 2012, Time included Diana on its All-Time 100 Fashion Icons list. Donatella Versace later remarked that she didn't "think that anyone, before or after her, has done for fashion what Diana did". Following the opening of an exhibition of Diana's clothes and dresses at Kensington Palace in 2017, Catherine Bennett of The Guardian said such exhibitions are among the suitable ways to commemorate public figures whose fashion styles were noted due to their achievements. The exhibition suggests to detractors who, like many other princesses, "looking lovely in different clothes was pretty much her life's work" which also brings interest in her clothing.

In 2016, fashion designer Sharmadean Reid designed a collection of clothes for ASOS.com inspired by Diana's style. "Di's incredible relationship with accessible sportswear through to luxury fashion forms the cornerstone of the collection and feels more modern than ever", Reid said about Diana in a press release. Diana was an inspiration for Off-White's spring 2018 show at Paris Fashion Week in 2017. The designer Virgil Abloh used Diana's signature looks as fragments to design new suits and attire. Supermodel Naomi Campbell, dressed in a combination of white blazer and cropped spandex leggings in reference to Diana's formal and off-duty styles, closed off the show. In 2019, Tory Burch used Diana's early 1980s style as an inspiration for her spring 2020 show at New York Fashion Week. In 2021, Rowing Blazers partnered with Warm & Wonderful to bring back the original "Black Sheep Sweater", just ahead of its appearance on Emma Corrin in The Crown. Multiple fictional dramatizations of her life have prominently featured recreations of outfits and fashion sense. In 2024, Tatler included Diana on its list of the most glamorous European royals.

== Gallery ==
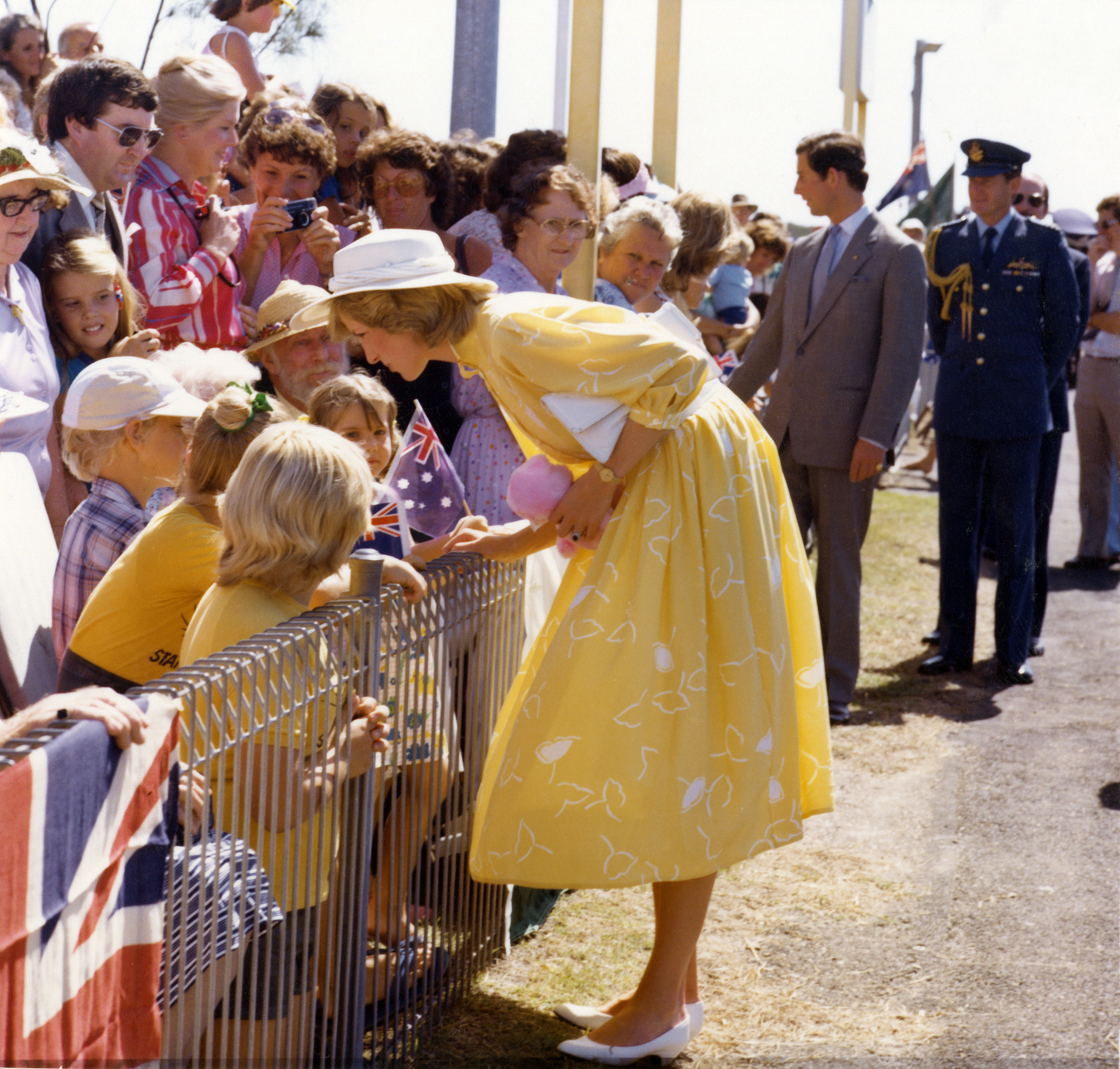
Diana wearing a yellow dress at Brisbane Airport, 1983

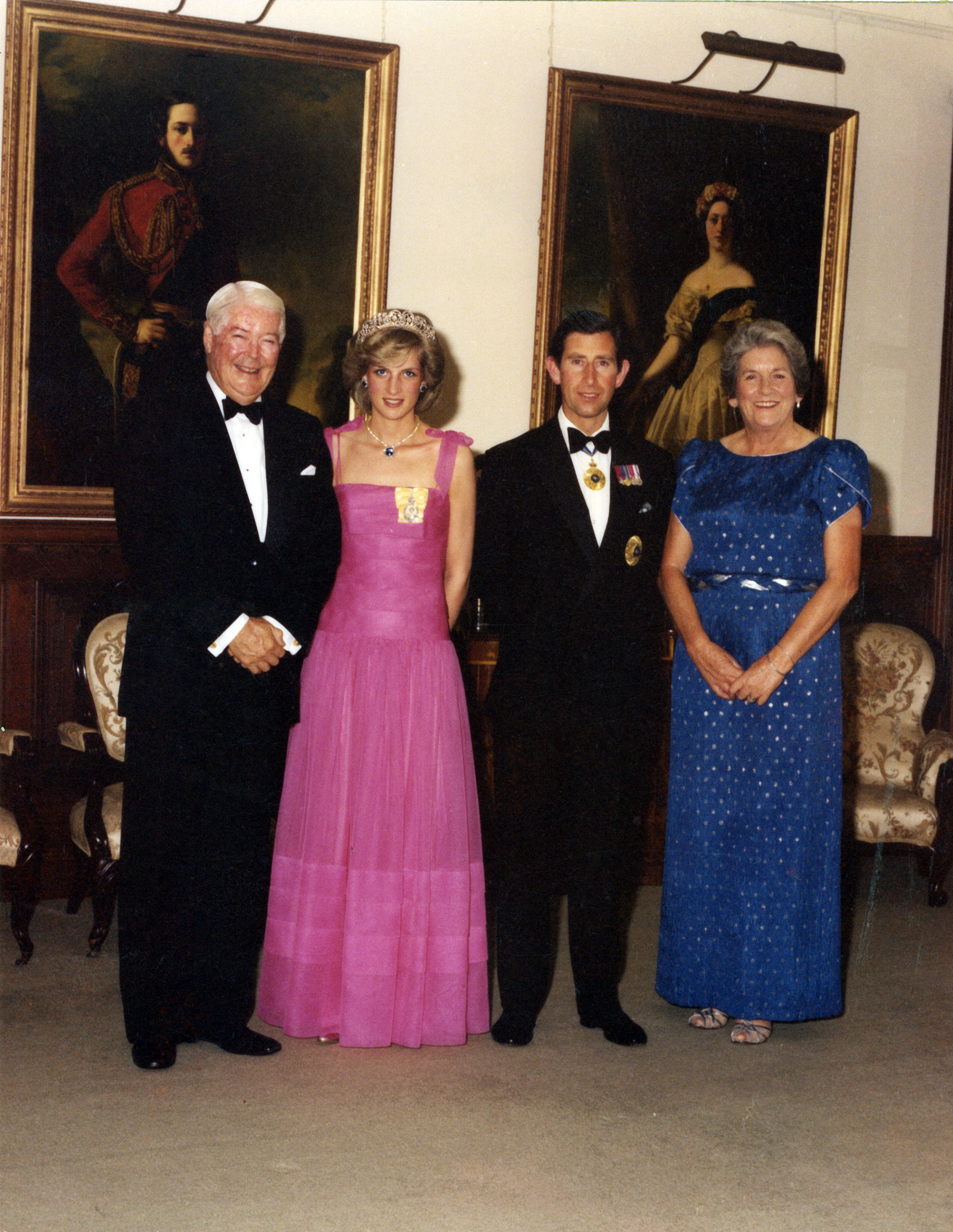
Diana wearing a pink ballgown at a gala banquet in Brisbane, 1983

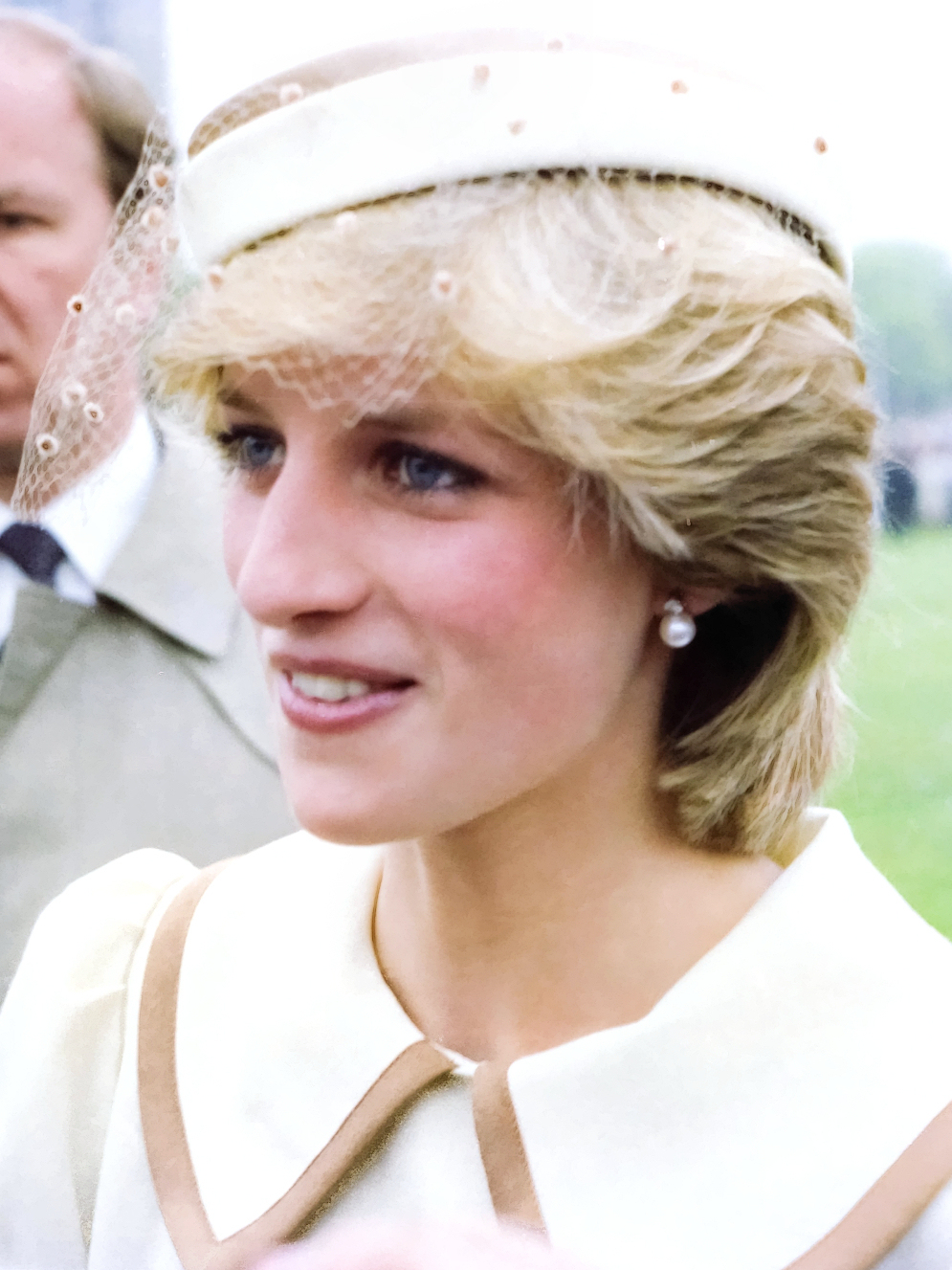
Diana wearing a white outfit and a matching fascinator at Halifax, Nova Scotia, 1983

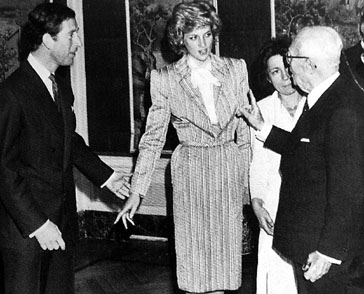
Diana wearing a dress with shoulder pads in Italy, 1985

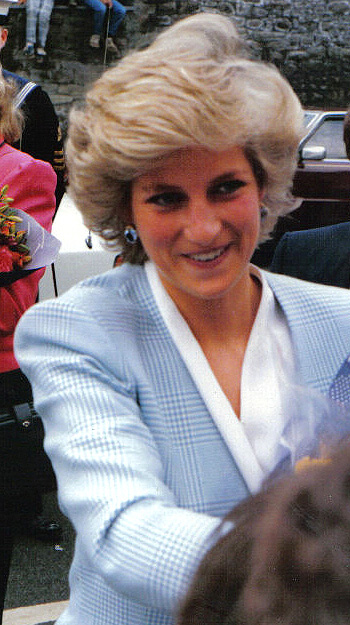
In Bristol, 1987

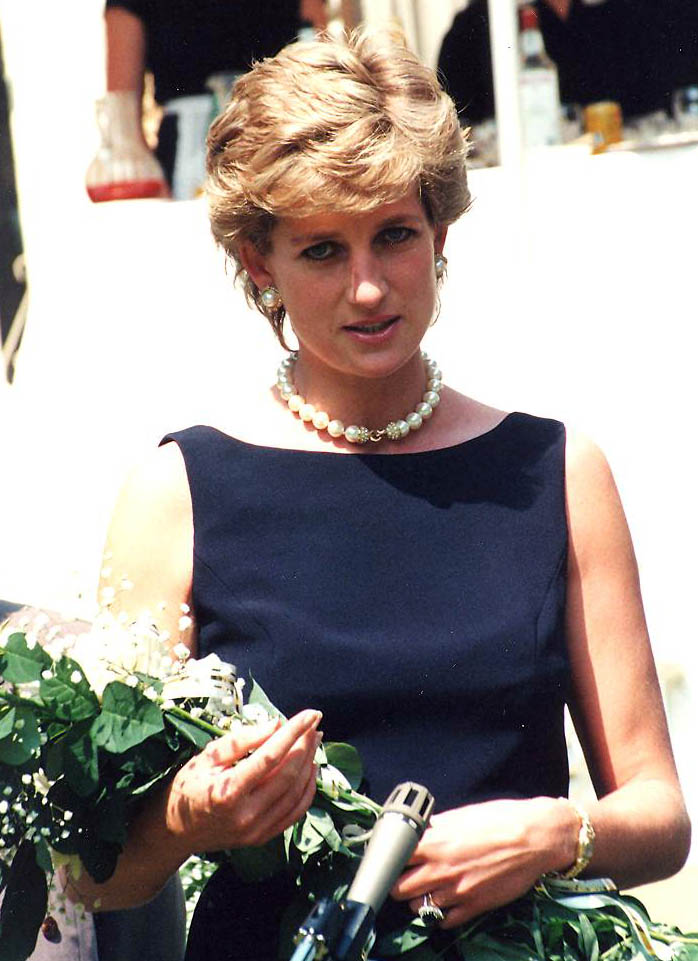
In Moscow, 1995

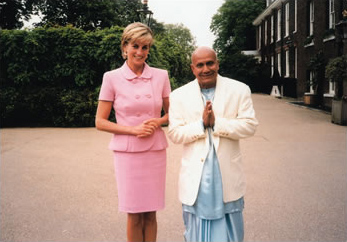
With Sri Chinmoy at Kensington Palace, 1997

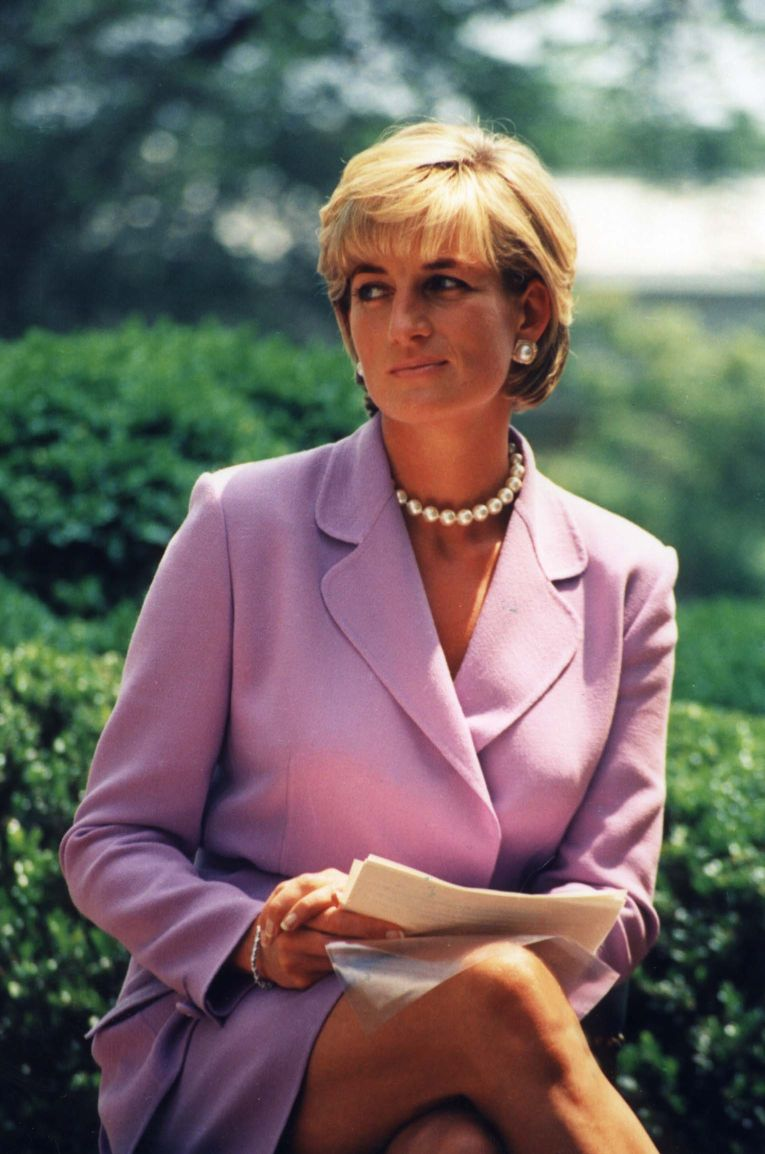
In Washington, D.C., 1997

== See also ==
- Wedding dress of Lady Diana Spencer
- Jewels of Diana, Princess of Wales
- List of best-selling individual magazine covers
