= Fashion icon =

Influential people who introduce new styles

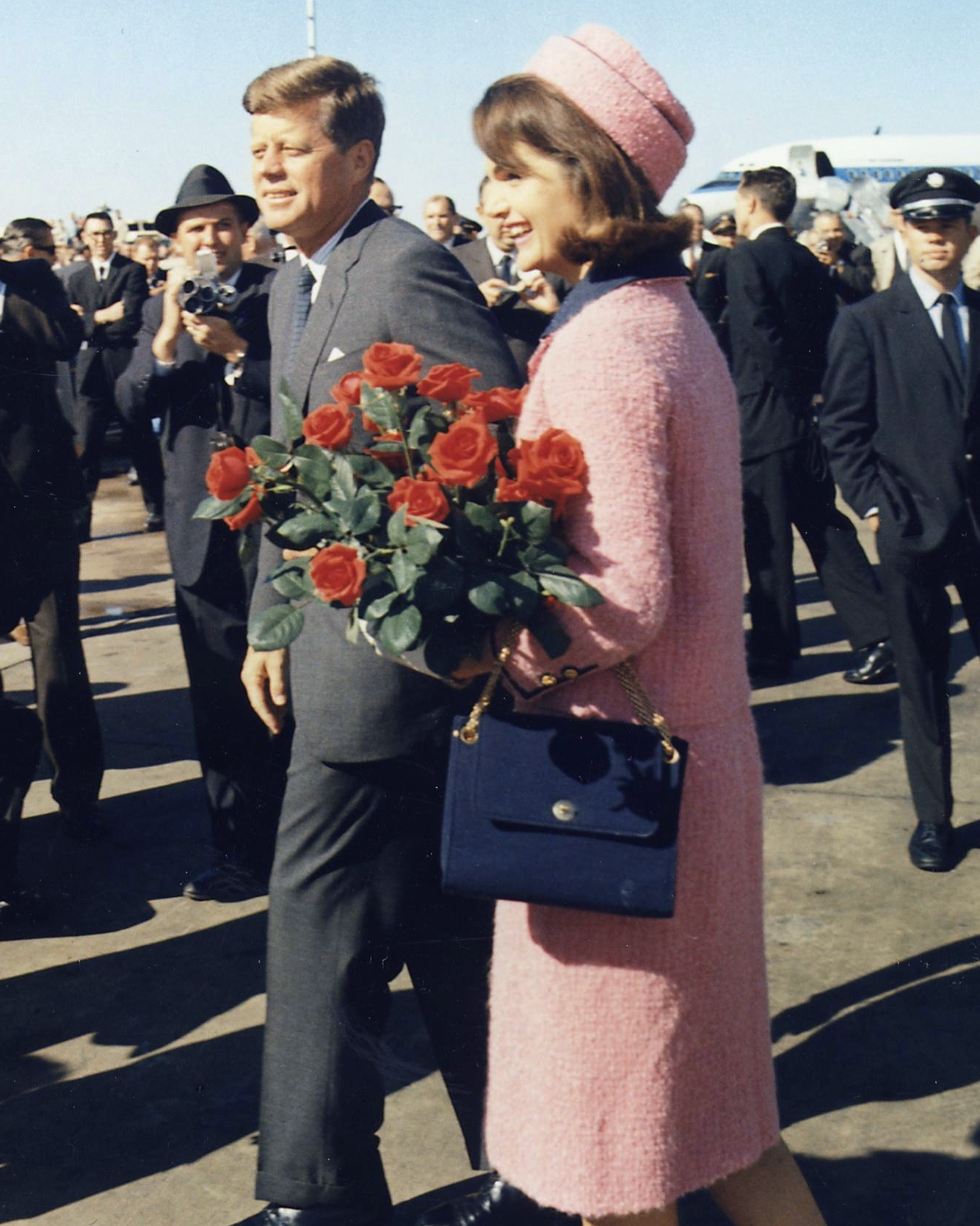
Jacqueline Bouvier Kennedy's Pink Chanel suit

A fashion icon or fashion leader is an influential person who introduces new styles which spread throughout fashion culture and become part of fashion. They initiate a new style which others may follow. They may be famous personalities such as political leaders, celebrities, or sports personalities. For example, during the 1960s, Jacqueline Kennedy Onassis was a great fashion icon for American women, and her style became a sign of wealth, power, and distinction; her famous Pink Chanel suit is one of the most referenced and revisited of all of her items of clothing. Twiggy is an example of an It girl and fashion icon of the Swinging Sixties.

== Fashion leaders ==
"Fashion leaders" is an older term that was replaced in the second half of the 20th century. Fashion leaders were considered to be important people of higher hierarchy and society such as royalty, aristocrats and their wives and mistresses.

- Queen Marie Antoinette, during her two-decade consort reign, had influenced the world of 18th-century fashion and design in France and Europe.
- Empress Joséphine, the first wife of Emperor Napoleon I, held the ''Empire dress line.''
- Beau Brummell, a friend of King George IV, was a fashion leader in men's fashion.
- Nur Jahan, the wife of the Mughal emperor Jahangir, was a fashion enthusiast, and she had a great interest in clothing items of that time; she set many fashion trends. She was very creative and had a good fashion sense, and she is credited for many textile materials and dresses such as the nurmahali dress, as well as fine cloths such as the Panchtoliya badla (silver-threaded brocade) and the kinari (silver-threaded lace), etc.
- Mary Quant was a famous fashion designer and fashion icon of the 1960s who introduced the miniskirt. She is also attributed to hotpants, the slip dress, and PVC raincoats.
- Diana, Princess of Wales was an English rose, a fashion leader in the 1980s and 1990s.
- Carolyn Bessette-Kennedy, the wife of John F. Kennedy Jr., was a fashion icon in the late 1990s.

== Other style icons ==
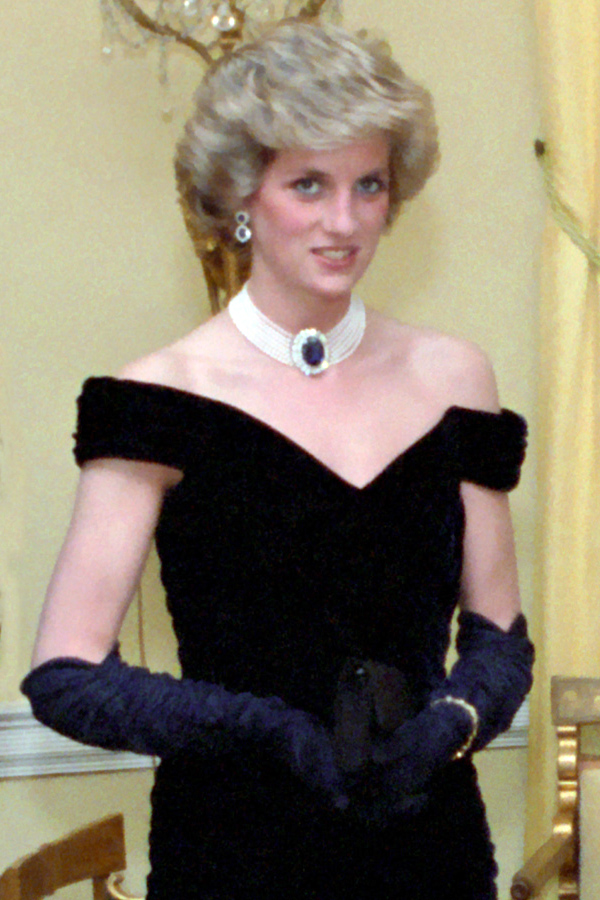
Wearing the Travolta dress, Diana, Princess of Wales was a well-known fashion icon

- Anna May Wong
- Josephine Baker
- Marlene Dietrich
- Eva Perón
- Wallis Simpson
- Audrey Hepburn (see Fashion of Audrey Hepburn)
- Marilyn Monroe (see Marilyn Monroe in popular culture)
- Rita Hayworth
- Brigitte Bardot
- Mary Quant
- Gayatri Devi
- Princess Margaret, Countess of Snowdon
- Grace Kelly
- Elizabeth Taylor
- Catherine Deneuve
- Grace Jones
- Diana, Princess of Wales (see Fashion of Diana, Princess of Wales)
- Madonna (see Fashion of Madonna)
- Vivienne Westwood
- Jean Paul Gaultier
- Ralph Lauren
- Marc Jacobs
- Beyoncé
- Björk
- Courtney Love
- Jennifer Tilly
- Naomi Campbell
- Shalom Harlow
- Kate Moss
- Cindy Crawford
- Claudia Schiffer
- Jennifer Lopez
- Chloë Sevigny
- Devon Aoki
- Peggy Lipton
- Iman
- Pamela Anderson
- Anne Hathaway
- Emma Chamberlain
- Paris Hilton
- Lindsay Lohan
- Emma Watson
- Lily-Rose Depp
- Cara Delevingne
- Carolyn Bessette-Kennedy
- Britney Spears
- Lady Gaga
- Lil’ Kim
- Rihanna
- Kim Kardashian
- Céline Dion
- Catherine, Princess of Wales (see Fashion of Catherine, Princess of Wales)
- Meghan, Duchess of Sussex

== Dresses ==
Similar to the Little Black Dress that is associated with actress Audrey Hepburn, the following garments are famously associated with fashion icons:

- Eugénie hat, the original Eugénie hat was named after Eugénie de Montijo, wife of Napoleon III, whose fashion choices were publicized in fashion sketches and closely scrutinized across Europe and the United States.
- Pink Chanel suit of Jacqueline Bouvier Kennedy
- Black Givenchy dress of Audrey Hepburn
- White dress of Marilyn Monroe
- Marilyn Monroe's pink dress
- Black dress of Rita Hayworth
- Gaultier conical corset of Madonna
- Travolta dress, worn by Diana, Princess of Wales when she danced with actor John Travolta.
- Revenge dress, worn by Diana, Princess of Wales to a fundraising dinner at the Serpentine Gallery.

=== Power dressing ===
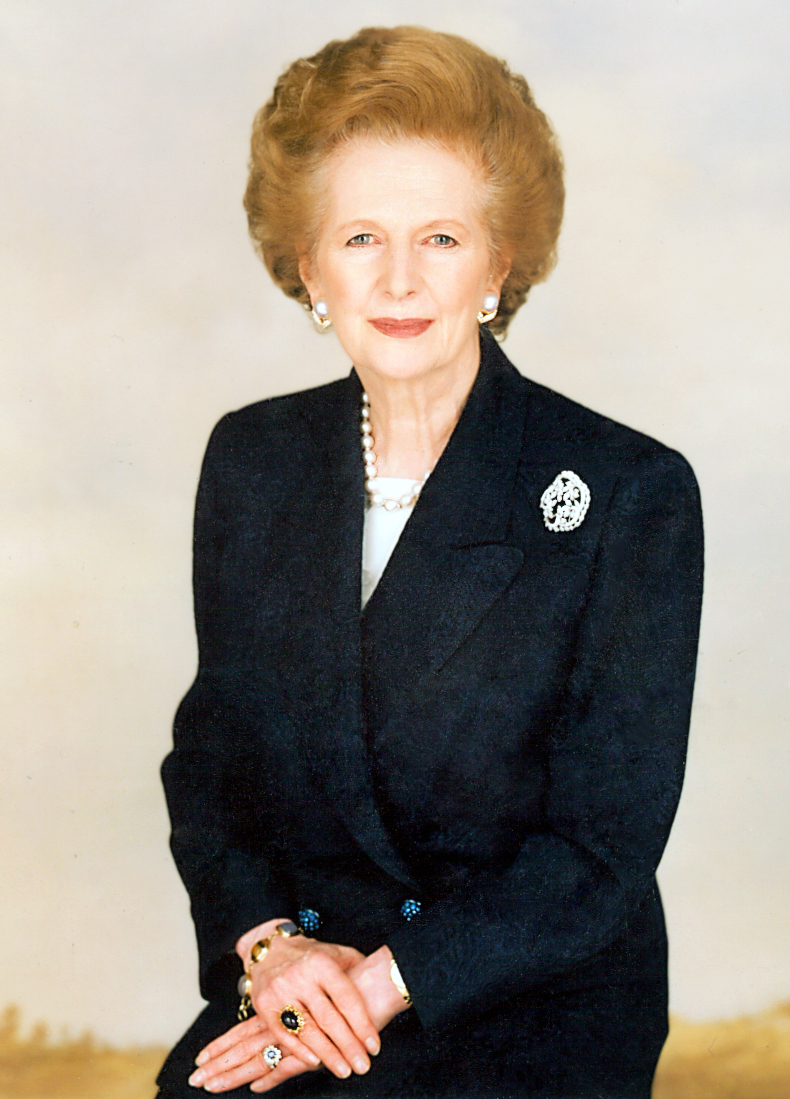
Margaret Thatcher wearing a typical power dressing outfit

Power dressing is a clothing style that enables women to establish their authority and power in a traditionally male dominated profession, such as politics. Margaret Thatcher's style, for example, set the rules on how female politicians should dress, which is a conservative, powerful but simultaneously feminine way.

- Margaret Thatcher was one of the first to incorporate the spirit of power suits.

== See also ==
- Model (person), a person with a role either to promote, display or advertise commercial products (notably fashion clothing in fashion shows) or to serve as a visual aid for people who are creating works of art or to pose for photography.
- Cultural icon, a person or an artifact that is identified by members of a culture as representative of that culture.
- Fashion journalism
