= Her-Age =

- Type: Private
- Industry: Luxury resale, Fashion
- Founded: September 2021
- Founders: Alba Figueras De La Parte; Alessandro Berna; Ataman Ersan
- Headquarters: Milan, Italy
- Area served: International
- Key people: Alessandro Berna (CEO); Alba Figueras De La Parte ) Ataman Ersan (Ex-CMO)
- Products: Vintage and pre-owned luxury fashion, accessories, and fine jewellery
- Services: Authentication, valuation, pricing, logistics

Her-Age is an online platform specializing in authenticated second-hand luxury fashion and operating through a network of collectors, boutiques, and professional sellers. It offers vintage and pre-owned items from international designer brands, with a particular focus on archival pieces and long-term value. The platform operates through a selective sourcing model within the luxury resale market.

== History ==
Her-Age was launched online in September 2021 by Alba Figueras De La Parte, Alessandro Berna and Ataman Ersan with a private collection of approximately 500 vintage and pre-owned designer pieces.

In 2022, the company partnered with Il Ponte auction house to present curated selections of luxury items.

In 2023, Her-Age partnered with Cavalli e Nastri during Milan Fashion Week, contributing to the presentation of vintage collections and launching the event format “Vintageland.”

Between 2023 and 2025, the company expanded its operations, product offering, and partnerships within the European luxury resale and fashion ecosystem.

In 2025, the company participated in Milan Design Week, showcasing curated vintage pieces in collaboration with Spinzi as part of the Fuorisalone program.

In February 2026, the company established an operational headquarters in Milan, located at Via Palermo 18, serving as a space for authentication, logistics, and private viewings of curated items.

== Activities ==
Her-Age operates as a curated platform for authenticated second-hand luxury fashion, including vintage clothing, accessories, and fine jewellery, sourcing items from private collectors, professional sellers, and vintage boutiques. The platform operates through a combination of direct sourcing, consignment, and partnerships with professional sellers and boutiques.

The company provides a full-service model, including authentication, valuation, pricing, and logistics of the items listed on the platform, supported by professional appraisal methodologies and quality control processes. Authentication processes include both digital review and physical quality control procedures.

The platform supports international sourcing and distribution and includes a selection of rare and archival pieces, such as haute couture garments and historically significant designs. It emphasizes collectible fashion and the preservation of design and cultural value within the luxury sector.

Her-Age is led by co-founders Alessandro Berna (Chief Executive Officer) and Alba Figueras De La Parte. Berna is the grandson of Franco Mattioli, co-founder of Gianfranco Ferré S.p.A., an Italian fashion house established in 1978.
