= Diana: Her Fashion Story =

Exhibition at Kensington Palace

Diana: Her Fashion Story was an art exhibition of gowns and suits worn by Diana, Princess of Wales, to mark the 20th anniversary of her death. It was originally open seasonally at Kensington Palace from February 2017 to February 2018, but later had an extended run until February 2019.

== Exhibition ==
The exhibition featured some of Diana's favourite dresses created by numerous fashion designers, including the Travolta dress. The exhibition, which was curated with the blessing of her sons, featured 25 dresses and traced her style evolution throughout the 1980s and 1990s. 5 of the 25 outfits were owned by Historic Royal Palaces, with the rest being on loan from owners around the world.

Eleri Lynn, curator of the exhibition, stated that the Princess sought not to be known as a "clothes horse", and mentioned that the style designed by Diana and Catherine Walker "was a very slender, fluid silhouette" to mimic timeless fashion, rather than the trends of the time period.

== Reception ==
Following the opening of the exhibition, Catherine Bennett of The Guardian said such exhibitions are among the suitable ways to commemorate public figures whose fashion styles were noted due to their achievements. The exhibition suggests to detractors who, like many other princesses, say that "looking lovely in different clothes was pretty much her life's work", that it also generates interest in her clothing.

Mark Hudson of The Daily Telegraph gave the exhibition four stars, calling it a "riveting" show that highlighted the "magnificence" of Diana's dresses and traced her fashion development through a series of themed displays.
