= Say Yes to the Dress: UK =

British reality television programme

Say Yes to the Dress is a reality television programme which started out as an American version and an Australian version. The British version started on the TLC channel in 2016. In 2017, it featured the reality TV personality, Olivia Buckland. The first series was in 2016, the second series was in 2017.

It is presented by Welsh fashion designer David Emanuel, who designed Princess Diana's wedding dress. It's hosted at the Confetti & Lace bridal boutique in Essex where David Emanuel, owner Christine Dando and her team help brides choose their dream dress.
