= S. G. Sender =

- Born: 12 December 1930
- Died: 12 July 2009 (aged 78)

S. G. Sender (12 December 1930 – 12 July 2009) was a Belgian pastry chef known as the "cakemaker to the kings" for his elaborate wedding cakes created for members of Europe's royalty. He was a specialist in so-called "prestige pieces" and designed wedding cakes for Belgium's King Baudouin as well as the wedding of Prince Charles and Lady Diana Spencer in 1981.

Sender was born Serge Gustave Sender Wayntraub in Mont-sur-Marchienne (today Charleroi), Belgium. He resided in neighboring France for much of his later life. His family had been patissiers (pastry chefs) for generations. It is believed that one of Sender's family members worked for French King Louis XIV. Another of Sender's ancestors, Antonin Carême, a 19th-century pastry chef, worked in the royal courts of Belgium, Great Britain, Japan, the Netherlands, and Sweden.

Sender created pastry items and cakes specifically for the Museum of the Decorative Arts in Paris. He also created pieces that were displayed at an exhibition on sugar at the Centre Pompidou in 1985 and 1986.

He co-authored a book on the history of cake and sweet-making in France. An avid collector, Sender acquired more than 6,000 items related to the culinary arts from the 16th century to the modern day. He was preservative of research library, 1989 November the 30, but the library had financial problems in 1996. The 6,154 books was the only collection in French in the 1990s, he used to say.

Sender died on 12 July 2009 near Paris at the age of 78 after a long illness. A religious service was held for him in Plaisir, France, and was attended by numerous patissiers and chefs.
