= Wedding of Prince Charles and Lady Diana Spencer =

1981 British royal wedding

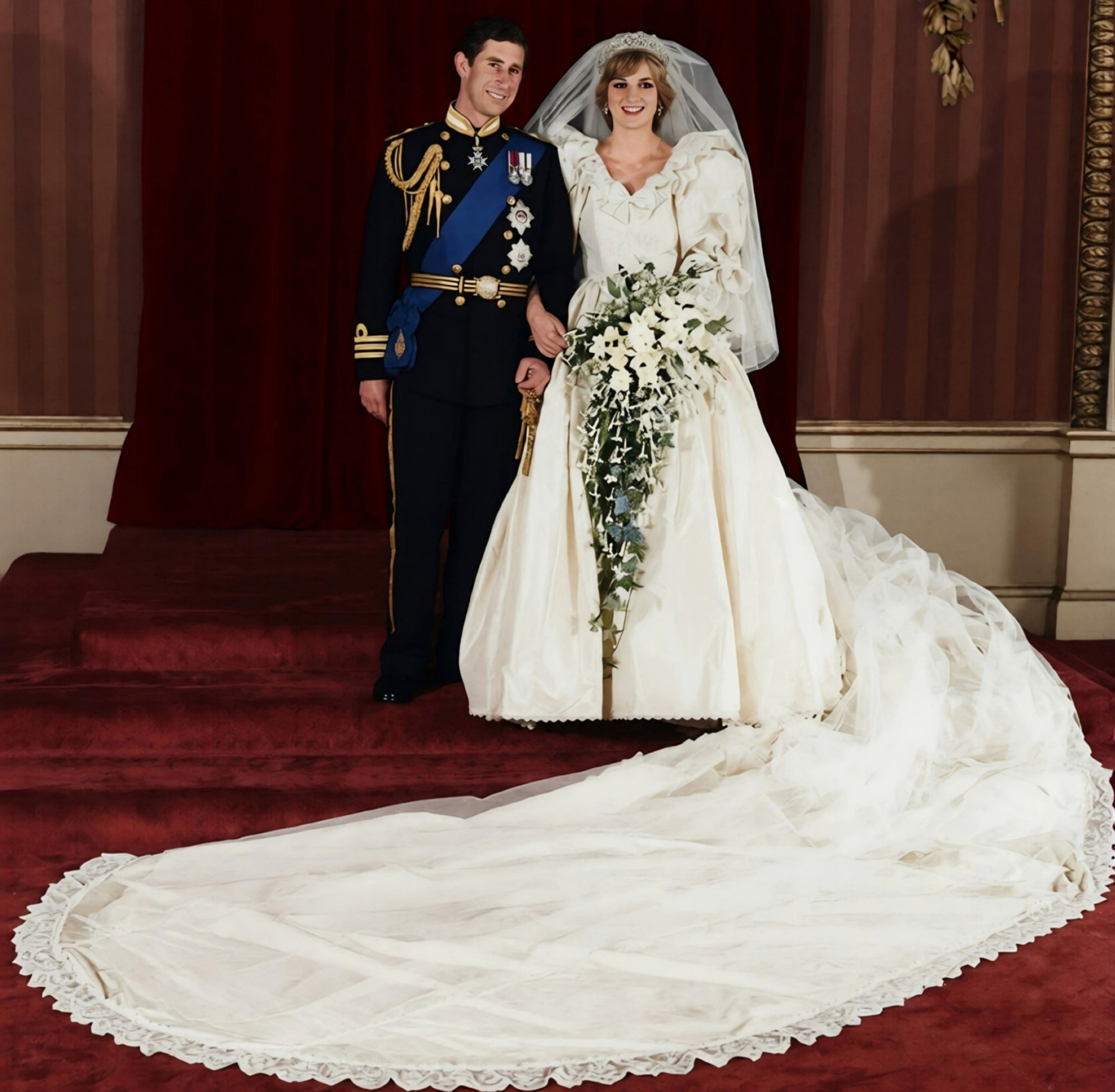
- Diana and Charles on their wedding day
- Date: 29 July 1981; 45 years ago
- Venue: St Paul's Cathedral
- Location: London, England
- Participants: Charles, Prince of Wales (later Charles III); Lady Diana Spencer

The wedding of Prince Charles (later King Charles III) and Lady Diana Spencer took place on Wednesday, 29 July 1981, at St Paul's Cathedral in London, England. The groom was the heir apparent to the British throne, and the bride was a member of the Spencer family.

The ceremony was a traditional Church of England wedding service. Alan Webster, Dean of St Paul's, presided at the service, and Robert Runcie, Archbishop of Canterbury, conducted the marriage. Notable figures in attendance included many members of other royal families, republican heads of state, and members of the bride's and groom's families. After the ceremony, the couple made the traditional appearance on the balcony of Buckingham Palace. The United Kingdom had a national holiday on that day to mark the wedding. The ceremony featured many ceremonial aspects, including use of the state carriages and roles for the Foot Guards and Household Cavalry.

Their marriage was widely billed as a "fairytale wedding" and the "wedding of the century". It was watched by an estimated global television audience of 750 million people. Events were held around the Commonwealth to mark the wedding. Many street parties were held throughout the United Kingdom to celebrate the occasion. The couple separated in 1992 and divorced in 1996 after fifteen years of marriage. Diana died in 1997 and Charles remarried to Camilla Parker Bowles in 2005.

== Engagement ==
Prince Charles had known Lady Diana Spencer for several years. They first met in 1977 while Charles was dating her elder sister Lady Sarah. He took serious interest in her as a potential bride in 1980 when they were guests at a country weekend, where she watched him play polo. He invited her for a sailing weekend to Cowes aboard the royal yacht Britannia as their relationship began to develop. This was followed by an invitation to Balmoral Castle, the Royal family's Scottish home, to meet his family. Diana was well received at Balmoral by Queen Elizabeth II, Prince Philip, and Queen Elizabeth the Queen Mother. The couple then had several dates in London. Diana and Charles had been seeing each other for about six months when he proposed on 3 February 1981 in the nursery at Windsor Castle. Diana had planned a holiday for the next week, and Charles hoped she would use the time to consider her answer. Diana accepted, but their engagement was kept secret for the next few weeks. Diana later claimed that the couple had met only 13 times in total before the announcement of their engagement.

The wedding of Charles and Diana commemorated on a 1981 British crown coin

Their engagement became official on 24 February 1981, and the couple gave an exclusive interview. During the public announcement of the engagement, Diana wore a "cobalt blue skirt suit" by the British label Cojana. Diana selected a large engagement ring that consisted of 14 solitaire diamonds surrounding a 12-carat oval blue Ceylon sapphire set in 18-carat white gold, which was similar to her mother's engagement ring. The ring was made by the Crown jewellers Garrard. In 2010, it became the engagement ring of Catherine Middleton, fiancée of Charles and Diana's eldest son, William. The Queen Mother gave Diana a sapphire and diamond brooch as an engagement present. A series of photographs taken by the Earl of Snowdon were published in Vogue in February 1981 to mark the engagement. Clayton Howard did Diana's make-up and John Frieda did her hair for the official portrait. The couple later sat down for another interview with BBC's Angela Rippon and ITV's Andrew Gardner.

Two nights before the wedding, a gala ball was held at Buckingham Palace, and the Queen subsequently hosted a dinner for a crowd of 90 individuals. A reception with dancing for 1,500 people was also held. Among the invitees were the royal household's members and staff. The night before the wedding 150 people, including heads of states and governments, were invited for a dinner with the Queen. Diana, who had primarily resided at Buckingham Palace during the engagement period, spent the night before her wedding at Clarence House.

In a series of tapes recorded for her 1992 biography, Diana said that she recalled discovering a bracelet which Charles had bought for his longtime lover Camilla Parker Bowles shortly before their wedding. Due to her suspicions she wanted to call off the wedding but was put off the idea by her sisters. In March 1981, she was photographed holding back tears at the airport where Charles was departing for a trip to Australia. Diana later revealed that she had been left disturbed after hearing a telephone conversation between Charles and Camilla in his study.

== Wedding ==
Combined coat of arms of Charles and Diana, the Prince and Princess of Wales

External videos
- Royal Wedding of Prince Charles and Lady Diana Spencer (1981) (external video)

The wedding took place on 29 July 1981. 3,500 guests made up the congregation at St Paul's Cathedral. Charles and Diana selected St Paul's over Westminster Abbey, the traditional site of royal weddings, because St Paul's offered more seating and permitted a longer procession through London.

The ceremony was a traditional Church of England wedding service, presided over by The Most Reverend Robert Runcie, Archbishop of Canterbury, and The Very Reverend Alan Webster, Dean of St Paul's Cathedral. Two million spectators lined the route of Diana's procession from Clarence House, with 4,000 police and 2,200 military officers to manage the crowds. The security increased and sharpshooters were stationed due to the potential threat of attack by the Irish Republican Army. The security screenings in the airports also increased. The cost of the wedding was later estimated to be $48 million in total (between $70M and $110M when adjusted for inflation), with $600,000 being spent on security. Regiments from the Commonwealth realms participated in the procession, including the Royal Regiment of Canada.

At 10:22 BST the Queen and the Royal Family were taken to the cathedral in eight carriages, the Prince of Wales in the 1902 State Landau, which was later used following the ceremony to take the couple back to Buckingham Palace. Lady Diana arrived at the cathedral in the Glass Coach with her father, Lord Spencer; she was escorted by six mounted Metropolitan Police officers. She arrived almost on time for the 11:20 BST ceremony. The carriage was too small to hold the two of them comfortably due to her voluminous dress and train. As the orchestra played Trumpet voluntary, an anthem by Jeremiah Clarke, the bride made the three-and-a-half minute walk up the aisle.

Diana accidentally changed the order of Charles's names during her vows, saying "Philip Charles Arthur George" instead of the correct "Charles Philip Arthur George". She did not promise to "obey" him as part of the traditional vows. That word was eliminated at the couple's request, which caused a sensation at the time. Charles also made an error, saying he would offer her "thy goods" instead of "my worldly goods". In keeping with tradition, the couple's wedding rings were crafted from Welsh gold from the Clogau St David's mine in Bontddu. The tradition of using Welsh gold within the wedding rings of the Royal Family dates back to 1923. Upon marriage Diana automatically acquired the title of Princess of Wales.

Other church representatives present who gave prayers after the service were a former Archbishop of Canterbury, Donald Coggan, Basil Cardinal Hume, the Right Reverend Andrew Doig and the Reverend Harry Williams CR.

=== Music ===
Three choirs, three orchestras and a fanfare ensemble played the music for the service. These were The Bach Choir, the Choir of St Paul's Cathedral, the Choir of the Chapel Royal, the Orchestra of the Royal Opera House, the Philharmonia Orchestra and the English Chamber Orchestra and a fanfare ensemble from the Royal Military School. The choirs were conducted by Barry Rose, the choirmaster at St Paul's. The cathedral's organist, Christopher Dearnley, and its sub-organist, John Scott, played the organ. The Orchestra of the Royal Opera House, the Philharmonia Orchestra and the English Chamber Orchestra were conducted by David Willcocks, who was the director of the Royal College of Music and of The Bach Choir; Richard Popplewell, the organist at Chapel Royal; and Colin Davis, who was the musical director of Covent Garden. Music and songs used during the wedding included the "Prince of Denmark's March", "I Vow to Thee, My Country", Elgar's "Pomp and Circumstance No. 4" and the British National Anthem ("God Save the Queen"). New Zealand soprano Kiri Te Kanawa sang the aria "Let the Bright Seraphim" from Handel's Samson, with John Wallace as solo trumpeter.

=== Clothing ===
Diana's wedding dress was valued at £9,000 (equivalent to £34,696 in 2025). The dress was made of ivory silk taffeta, decorated with lace, hand embroidery, sequins, and 10,000 pearls. It was designed by Elizabeth and David Emanuel and had a 25-foot (7.6 m) train of ivory taffeta and antique lace. The dress was designed according to Diana's wishes who wanted it to have the longest train in the royal wedding history. The bride wore her family's heirloom tiara over an ivory silk tulle veil, and had her hair styled short crop down by hair dresser Kevin Shanley. She wore a pair of low-heeled Clive Shilton shoes "with C and D initials hand-painted on her arches" and decorated with 542 sequins and 132 pearls. For the customary bridal themes of "Something old, something new, something borrowed, something blue", Diana's wedding dress had an antique lace "made with a fabric spun at a British silk farm" (the "old"), the Spencer family tiara and her mother's earrings (the "borrowed"), and a blue bow sewn into the waistband (the "blue"). The official parfumeur of the royal wedding was Houbigant Parfum, the oldest French fragrance company. Diana chose the floral scent Quelques Fleurs, which featured "notes of tuberose, jasmine and rose". She was reported to have accidentally spilled perfume over a part of her dress which she later covered with her hand during the ceremony. The bride also had a pair of slippers made out of hand-made ivory silk with pearl and sequin embroidery. Barbara Daly did the bride's make-up for the ceremony.

Per the Queen's orders, two similar bouquets were prepared for the bride by David Longman which contained "gardenias, stephanotis, odontolglossum orchid, lily of the valley, Earl Mountbatten roses, freesia, veronica, ivy, myrtle and trasdescantia".

As a Commander in the Royal Navy, Charles wore his ceremonial day dress uniform. He wore the star and riband of the Order of the Garter, the star of the Order of the Thistle, the neck badge of the Order of the Bath, the Queen Elizabeth II Coronation Medal and Silver Jubilee Medal. The uniform was completed with a gold aiguillette across the right soldier and the Queen's cypher on his epaulettes, reflecting his position as personal aide de camp to the Sovereign. He carried a "full dress sword tassled in gold."

=== Attendants ===
The royal couple had seven bridal attendants. Eleven-year-old Lord Nicholas Windsor, son of the Duke and Duchess of Kent, and eight-year-old Edward van Cutsem, godsons of the Prince of Wales, were page boys. Diana's bridesmaids were seventeen-year-old Lady Sarah Armstrong-Jones, daughter of the Earl of Snowdon and Princess Margaret; thirteen-year-old India Hicks, daughter of David and Lady Pamela Hicks, and granddaughter of Lord Mountbatten; six-year-old Catherine Cameron, daughter of Donald and Lady Cecil Cameron and granddaughter of the Marquess of Lothian; eleven-year-old Sarah-Jane Gaselee, daughter of Nick Gaselee and his wife; and five-year-old Clementine Hambro, daughter of Rupert Hambro and the Hon Mrs Hambro and granddaughter of Lord and Lady Soames and great-granddaughter of Winston Churchill. Princes Andrew and Edward were the Prince of Wales's supporters (the equivalent of "best man" for a royal wedding).

=== Guests ===
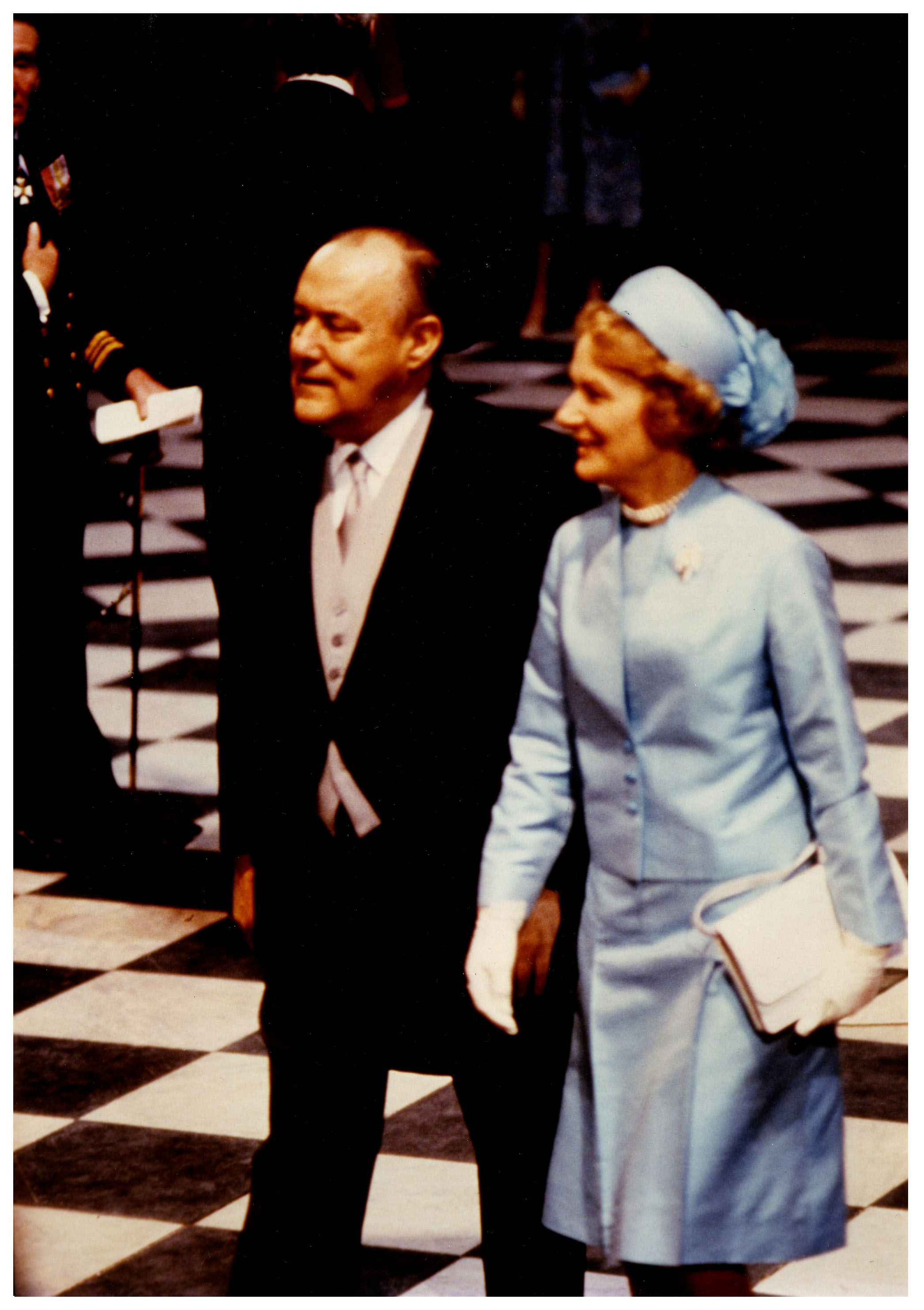
Prime Minister of New Zealand Robert Muldoon and his wife Thea Muldoon attending the royal wedding

All of the governors-general of the Commonwealth realms, as well as the reigning European monarchs, attended, with the exception of King Juan Carlos I and Queen Sofía of Spain. (The Spanish king was "advised" not to attend by his government because the newlyweds' honeymoon included a stopover in the disputed territory of Gibraltar.) Most of Europe's elected heads of state were among the guests, with the exceptions of the President of Greece, Konstantinos Karamanlis (who declined because Greece's exiled monarch, Constantine II, a kinsman and friend of the bridegroom, had been invited as "King of the Hellenes"), and the President of Ireland, Patrick Hillery (who was advised by Taoiseach Charles Haughey not to attend because of the dispute over the status of Northern Ireland). (Note: The period when the advice was given coincided with a change of government. Traditionally Irish presidents and British royalty did not meet publicly because of the Northern Ireland issue.) First Lady Nancy Reagan represented the United States at the wedding. While Gambian President Dawda Jawara attended the wedding, the Gambia Socialist Revolutionary Party attempted a coup d'état in his home country. Among other invitees were the couple's friends and the bride invited the staff of the nursery school in which she had worked to the wedding. Spike Milligan and Harry Secombe were among the entertainers who were invited to the ceremony by the Prince of Wales.

=== Reception ===
The couple and 120 guests went to Buckingham Palace for a wedding breakfast following the ceremony. Diana and Charles made a traditional appearance on a balcony of Buckingham Palace at 13:10 BST, and delighted the crowd when they kissed, initiating the tradition of kissing the bride on the balcony. Over the night, fireworks were displayed above Hyde Park and 100 beacons were lit up across the country to celebrate the royal wedding.

The couple had 27 wedding cakes. The Naval Armed Forces supplied the official wedding cake. David Avery, head baker at the Royal Naval cooking school in Chatham Kent, made the cake over 14 weeks. They made two identical cakes in case one was damaged. The Prince of Wales's coat of arms and the Spencer family's crest were used in the decoration of the five-foot-tall layered fruitcake which weighed 225 pounds. The couple's other wedding cake was created by Belgian pastry chef SG Sender, who was known as the "cakemaker to the kings". Another wedding cake was created by Chef Nicholas Lodge; Chef Nicholas had previously made the Queen Mother's 80th Birthday Cake and also commissioned to create a Christening Cake for Prince Harry. A slice of the couple's wedding cake was later auctioned off by Julien's Auctions in 2018 and was estimated to sell between $800–$1,200. Another slice sold for £1,850 ($2,565) in a 2021 auction.

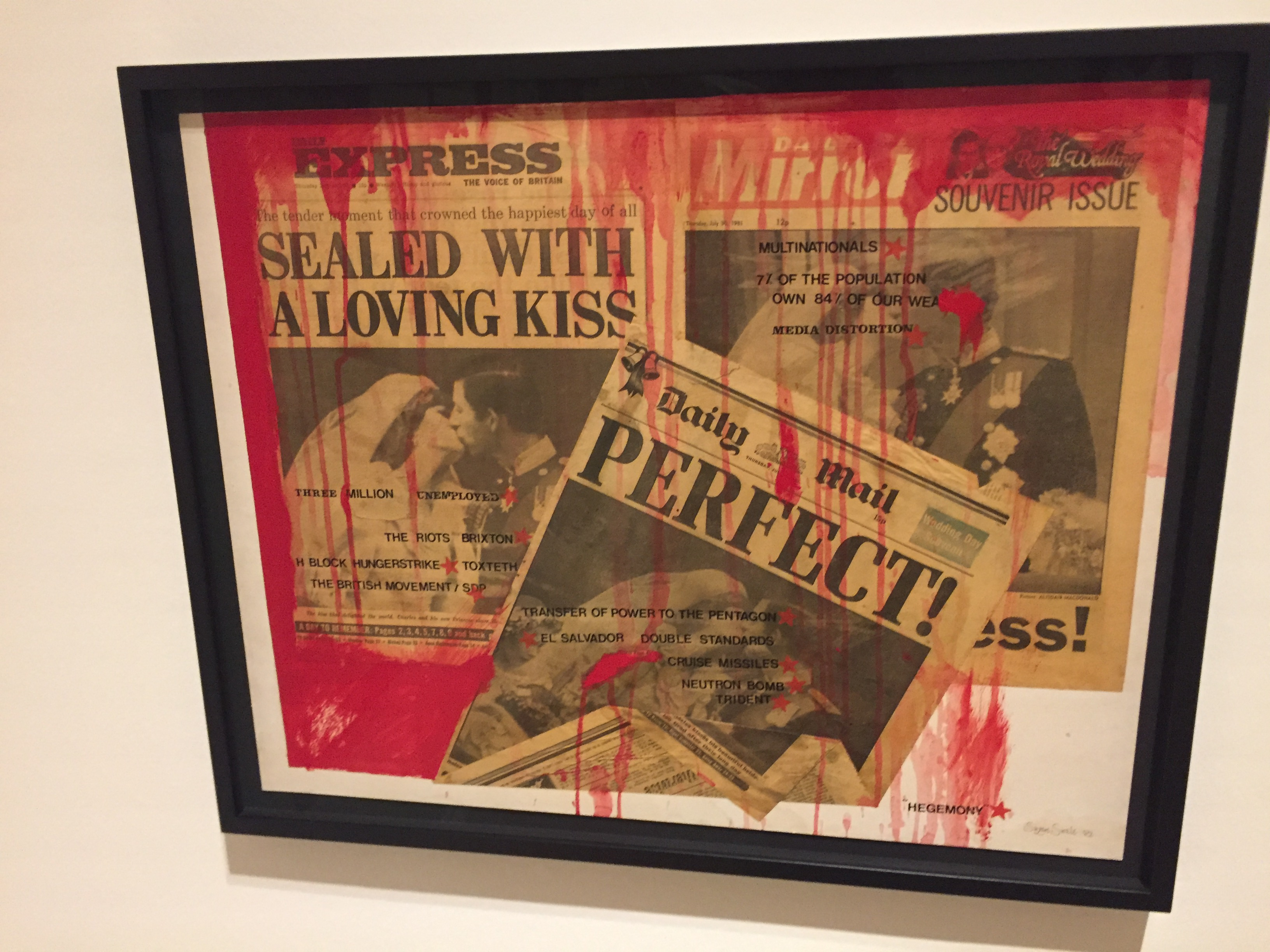
An art piece criticising the media reaction to the wedding

An estimated 750 million people watched the ceremony worldwide on television, and this figure allegedly rose to a billion when the radio audience is added in, although there are no means of verifying these figures. 28.4 million watched the event on BBC and ITV in the UK. Angela Rippon, Peter Woods, Tom Fleming, Wynford Vaughan-Thomas, Rolf Harris, and Terry Wogan provided the coverage for the BBC on television and radio. BBC Two's coverage was designed to draw in hearing impaired viewers by providing subtitles, which marked "the first big outing for the Palantype system". The event was broadcast in 50 countries with near 100 television companies covering it. In the UK, the National Grid reported a huge surge in demand for power after the service. The wedding ceremony was positively received by the public, and according to The New York Times symbolised "the continuity of the [British] monarchy".

A number of ceremonies and parties were held at different places by the public to celebrate the occasion across the United Kingdom. 600,000 people lined the streets of London to watch the ceremony, and it was estimated that around 10 million people took part in the street parties. The wedding was widely broadcast on television and radio in many countries, and news channels covered the ceremony in different languages. Poet Laureate of the United Kingdom John Betjeman released a poem in honour of the couple. British republicans were largely "muted" during the wedding, with some travelling to France or Ireland or releasing black balloons over London to express their disapproval. However, these represented only a small minority of the British public, and The New York Times noted that "even cynics felt a surge of sentimentality" towards the royal family.

=== Gifts ===
The couple received gifts from foreign officials, including an engraved Steuben glass bowl and Boehm porcelain centerpiece from the United States; a set of antique furniture and "a watercolor of loons" by Canadian Robert Bateman for Prince Charles, together with "a large brooch of gold, diamonds and platinum" for Diana from Canada; handcrafted silver platters from Australia; an "all-wool broadloom carpet" from New Zealand; "a matching diamond and sapphire watch, bracelet, pendant, ring, and earrings" from the Crown Prince of Saudi Arabia; a "small oil painting by the American artist Henry Kohler of Prince Charles playing polo" as the personal gift of John J. Louis Jr., the American ambassador to the UK; and a clock in Art Deco style by Cartier's chief designer, Daniel Ciacquinot. The Edinburgh District Council was among the organisations that made a charitable donation in honour of the couple's wedding and donated $92,500 to the Thistle Fund, "a charity for the disabled". The Greater Manchester Council offered engineering apprenticeships for a small number of unemployed young people, and Cambridge University sent "a spare copy of The Complete English Traveller" by Robert Sanders. The Worshipful Company of Glovers of London presented the couple with gloves made out of leather, silks and cotton. A number of these gifts were displayed at St James's Palace from 5 August to 4 October 1981.

== Honeymoon ==
A "just married" sign was attached to the landau by Princes Andrew and Edward. The couple was driven over Westminster Bridge to catch the train from Waterloo station to Romsey in Hampshire to begin their honeymoon. The couple left from Waterloo station in the British Royal Train + 975025 Caroline. They travelled to Broadlands, where Prince Charles's parents had spent their wedding night in 1947. They stayed there for three days, then flew to Gibraltar, where they boarded the Royal Yacht Britannia for an eleven-day cruise of the Mediterranean, visiting Tunisia, Sardinia, Greece and Egypt. Then they flew to Scotland, where the rest of the royal family had gathered at Balmoral Castle, and spent time in a hunting lodge on the estate. During that time, the press was given an arranged opportunity to take pictures. Despite their happy appearance, Diana's suspicion over Charles having an enduring affection for his former lover Camilla grew as Camilla's photographs fell out of his diary and Diana discovered that he was wearing cufflinks that were given to him by Camilla. By the time the couple returned from their honeymoon, their wedding gifts were displayed at St James's Palace.

== See also ==
- Abduction of Vishal Mehrotra, infamous unsolved abduction of a child that occurred in London on the day of the wedding
- A Royal Wedding Suite

== Bibliography ==
- Dimbleby, Jonathan (1994). The Prince of Wales: A Biography. New York: William Morrow and Company. ISBN 0-688-12996-X.
- Morton, Andrew (1997) [1992]. Diana: Her True Story – In Her Own Words. New York: Simon & Schuster. ISBN 0-684-85080-X.
