= Sara Davenport =

British philanthropist and art dealer (born 1962)

Sara Davenport (born 1962) is a British philanthropist and former art dealer best known for founding The Breast Cancer Haven, a breast cancer support charity. Davenport came to national attention when, in 1996, she sold her art gallery to establish a new breast cancer support initiative, which has since opened centres in seven locations across the UK, with another three planned.

== Early life ==
Sara Davenport was born in London in 1962 and grew up between London and Herefordshire. She went to Cambridge University (1980–83) and read History of Art. After graduating, she worked at Hodder and Stoughton publishers before returning to the art world, selling 18th and 19th century paintings at the Cadogan Gallery, Pont St, London. In 1985, she opened the Sara Davenport Gallery in Walton Street, Knightsbridge – one of the only galleries in the world to specialise exclusively in 18th & 19th Century dog paintings. She owned the gallery until 1996.

== Charity ==
In 1993, her children's nanny, Wendy Ricketts, was diagnosed with breast cancer. Davenport noted in regard to the National Health Service (NHS) that, "while the dedication of the doctors was indisputable from a medical point of view, the mental and emotional support that the NHS offered was lacking". After speaking to patients, nurses and doctors, who shared similar concerns, she realised she had spotted a gap in the care these patients were receiving.

She resolved to ensure there existed "one centre in which a range of services for breast cancer sufferers were available under one roof" – information, support, counselling and the widest range of complementary therapies available in Britain".

She approached several large charities, proposing that they set up and manage clinics based on her concept across the country for which she would fundraise and raise the initial capital investment. The charities she approached rejected the proposal and it became clear that if she wanted her concept to become reality, she would have to make it happen herself.

As a result, on 10 October 1996, Davenport retired as an art dealer and sold her entire gallery collection (alongside a substantial portion of her private collection) at Bonhams Auction House in Knightsbridge, London.

In this way, together with the sale of the lease to her gallery, she raised the money to buy an initial building for the Breast Cancer Haven's use, and she committed to giving the charity a 20-year lease at a peppercorn rent to get the charity off the ground – thereby making a donation which would be worth millions over the first two decades of the charity's existence.

It took six months before she found the right location for the charity's first centre – a dilapidated chapel in Fulham Broadway, close to both The Royal Marsden Cancer Hospital and the specialist Breast Cancer Unit at Charing Cross Hospital.

A fundraising campaign was launched to raise funds for the chapel's renovation and for the first two years of running costs. A board of trustees was formed, which included Jeremy Leigh Pemberton, brother of the former Governor of the Bank of England, who became the charity's first chairman. The first Breast Cancer Haven in London was opened by the charity's Patron, the Prince of Wales, in February 2000, and since then, further centres have opened in Hereford (in January 2004), Leeds (in October 2008), Hampshire (in October 2015), Wessex (in October 2015), Worcester (in January 2016) and another in London.

== Personal life ==
Sara Davenport has two children, Sophie and Alexia, with her ex-husband, Adrian Kyriazi.
