= Gucci Diana =

Leather and bamboo handbag by Gucci

Gucci Diana is a leather handbag with bamboo handles designed by the Florence-based luxury fashion house Gucci. First introduced in 1991, it was popularized by and then named after Diana, Princess of Wales. The bag is now an expensive status symbol.

== Design ==
The Diana bag is a rectangular tote. Originally made with wooden bamboo-shaped handles surrounded with functional bands to keep their shape, the bag was first introduced in 1991. It was redesigned by Alessandro Michele and released as a part of Gucci's Diana Capsule in 2021. The redesigned bag features removable neon leather belts wrapped around the bamboo handles. The detachable high-vis straps have varying fluoro alternatives and the inside of the belts can be decorated with different symbols and letters to bring customizable charm. The bag is available in three sizes - mini, small and medium - and seven colors, and as of 2021 its price ranges from US$2,600 to US$12,000.

== History ==
Diana, Princess of Wales has been credited with bringing the handbag into the limelight. In the 1990s, she was constantly photographed by the paparazzi carrying the bag while leaving the gym or walking on the streets. It became a signature of "her personal freedom" as she liked to "dispense with the formality around royal dress codes". Although the bag instantly became associated with Diana, it was not officially renamed until 2021.
