= Catherine Walker (fashion designer) =

British fashion designer

- Born: Catherine Marguerite Marie-Thérèse Baheux; 27 June 1945; Calais, France
- Died: 23 September 2010 (aged 65); Sussex, England
- Education: Université Lille Nord de France; University of Provence
- Occupation: Fashion designer
- Spouses: John Walker (m. 1970; died 1975); Said Ismael Cyrus
- Children: 2

Catherine Walker (27 June 1945 – 23 September 2010) born Catherine Marguerite Marie-Thérèse Baheux in Calais, France. She was a French-born fashion designer based in London, United Kingdom.

Walker was notably known for having supplied over a thousand garments for Diana, Princess of Wales.

== Early life ==
Walker studied aesthetics and philosophy at the universities of Lille and Aix-en-Provence and achieved a master's degree. While studying for a PhD she moved to London and lived in Earl's Court. She became a permanent UK resident after marrying solicitor John Walker in 1970. The couple had two daughters. In 1975 John Walker had a heart attack and died while on holiday in France.

Her second husband was Saeed Ishmæl Cyrus, an Iranian lecturer at the Chelsea School of Art who co-founded Catherine Walker Ltd with her.

== Career ==
She began her life in fashion making and selling children's clothes. She later moved into designing for women, specialising in high-end evening dresses, occasionwear and wedding gowns. In 1976, she and her husband Said Cyrus set up The Chelsea Design Company in Sydney Street, Chelsea. In 1991, Walker was awarded Designer of the Year for Glamour and in 1990 Designer of the Year for Couture at the British Fashion Awards. Walker was diagnosed with breast cancer in 1995. She became a founding sponsor of Breast Cancer Haven.

== Company ==
Catherine Walker opened her business in 1977 a small shop in Sydney Street, London. She was a successful couturiere for over 30 years. Walker designed two seasonal collections per year, as well as wedding gowns and she created a range of skincare products. Following her death, her husband Said Cyrus continued the business as head designer. He continues to run it with the same philosophy, focusing on bespoke garments for clients and eschewing runway shows, large marketing campaigns, and the wholesale trade.

== Notable clients ==
Many European royals and high-profile individuals have worn Catherine Walker because her very formal designs in a range of colours for daywear and embroidered evening wear closely match the requirements of formal events.

Diana Spencer, Princess of Wales: Catherine Walker became one of the Princess of Wales' favourite designers. Her professional relationship with Diana began three months after Diana's marriage to Prince Charles in 1981, and lasted until Diana's death sixteen years later, during which time Walker provided the Princess with many of her most iconic garments.

Walker created the dress and lace veil which Diana wore at the Apostolic Palace during a Pontifical audience with Pope John Paul II on 29 April 1985, the same dress Diana was buried in along with a personal rosary gifted to her by Saint Teresa of Calcutta.

Catherine, Princess of Wales: Walker's designs are also chosen by Diana's daughter-in-law, Catherine. Catherine Walker has become one of the current Princess of Wales favourite designers and she chooses to wear the designer's creations for formal engagements.

Prince William had a few coats made by Catherine Walker as a child.

The Duke of Kent's daughter, Lady Helen Taylor (née Windsor), wore a Catherine Walker design for her 1992 wedding to Tim Taylor.

Katharine, Duchess of Kent has worn many designs by Catherine Walker, including a dress to attend William, Prince of Wales's wedding in 2011

Lady Gabriella Kingston has been wearing CW designs since her teenage years and has stayed loyal to the brand. She wore the designer's coatdress to the memorial service for Catherine Walker in 2010. She almost always wears the designer's pieces to the formal royal events, most recently the coronation of King Charles III at Westminster Abbey, London.

Sophie Winkleman formally Lady Frederick Windsor, the sister-in-law of Lady Gabriella Kingston is also a fan of the Catherine Walker fashion house. She has been seen in CW outfit for many formal royal events

Carole Middleton, the mother of Catherine, Princess of Wales wore Catherine Walker for numerous public occasions.

Mette-Marit, Crown Princess of Norway wore a classic Catherine Walker coatdress in red during a Nobel Peace Prize ceremony.

Marie Chevallier – wife of Louis Robert Paul Ducruet (son of Princess Stéphanie of Monaco and Daniel Ducruet), has chosen a Catherine Walker coatdress to attend a Catholic Mass at the Monaco Cathedral during the celebrations marking Monaco's National Day in Monaco, on 19 November 2019.

Judi Dench has worn a bespoke Catherine Walker piece for British Vogue -Ask a legend interview in 2020.

J.K. Rowling wore a Paddington coat dress to receive her insignia as a Member of the Order of the Companions of Honour in 2017.

== Death ==
Walker died on 23 September 2010 in a hospital, after being found unconscious by a neighbour at her home in Sussex, England. She had suffered breast cancer, and was a founding sponsor of the charity Breast Cancer Haven. Walker was survived by her second husband Said Ismael Cyrus and two daughters, Naomi and Marianne, from her first marriage.
