= List of best-selling individual magazine covers =

This is a list of some of the highest selling magazine cover issues. It does not include sales of centerfolds or posters. The list covers various types of magazines and individual special editions. Entries are based on issues that sold or were distributed at over 3 million copies through newsstands and other distribution channels.

In the United States, Life magazine was the highest-selling magazine for several decades, according to Slate in 2013, reaching a weekly circulation of 4 million copies and more than 10 million readers at its peak—equivalent to about 10 percent of the U.S. population at the time. Slate stated that People magazine later became weekly's highest-seller. Several individual issues of People sold 2 million copies, according to The New York Times in 2009.

== List of highest-selling individual magazine cover issues ==
The following list includes magazine cover issues that sold more than 3 million copies.

United States
Date	Publication	Cover title	Cover subject(s), Topic	Sales (in million)	Notes
March 1973	Family Circle	—N/a	—N/a	9.5	
August 1964	Life	"The Beatles: They're Here Again and What a Ruckus!"	The Beatles	8.5	
April 1965	Life	"Drama of Life Before Birth"	—N/a	8	First-four days copies according to American Society of Magazine Editors
September 2001	Time	"Especial Edition: Sept.11"	September 11 attacks	7.5	
November 1972	Playboy	—N/a	Lena Söderberg	7.16	Playboy's highest-selling issue.
September 1984	Penthouse	"Miss America Oh God, She's Nude!"	Vanessa Williams	5.3	Penthouse's highest-selling issue
September 1985	Penthouse	"Madonna in the Nude"	Madonna	5	
September 1985	Playboy	"Madonna Nude: Unlike a Virgin... For the Very First Time"	Madonna	5	
March 1989	Playboy	"Michael's Sister in a Thriller Pictorial"	La Toya Jackson	5	
September 2001	People	"Sept.11, 2011 The Day That Shook America"	September 11 attacks	4.1	
December 1995	Playboy	"Farrah Fawcett Holiday Pictorial"	Farrah Fawcett	4	Best-selling issue of the decade.
July 1955	Confidential	"Willie Mays' Luckiest Strikeout!"	Various	3.7	
1997	People	"Diana Princess of Wales 1961—1997"	Diana, Princess of Wales	3.1	Tribute to Diana, special edition.

International
Country of origin	Date	Publication	Cover title	Cover model(s), Event	Sales (in million)	Notes
France	January 2015	Charlie Hebdo	"Je suis Charlie" (issue No. 1178)	Charlie Hebdo shooting	7.95 (in printed)	Highest-print run for French press
Japan	December 1994	Weekly Shōnen Jump	"またまた新記録! 発行部数653万部突破記念号!" ("Another new record! The issue in honor of 6.53 million copies printed!")	Manga characters	6.53 (in printed)	New Year issue for 1995; Weekly Shōnen Jump's highest-selling issue

== See also ==
- List of magazines by circulation
- List of best-selling sheet music
- List of most expensive photographs
- List of most expensive celebrity photographs
- List of most expensive books and manuscripts
