= Wedding dress of Lady Diana Spencer =

Wedding dress of the former Princess of Wales

- Diana wearing her bridal gown
- Designer: David and Elizabeth Emanuel
- Year: 1981
- Type: Ivory silk taffeta and antique lace gown
- Material: Silk, taffeta, lace

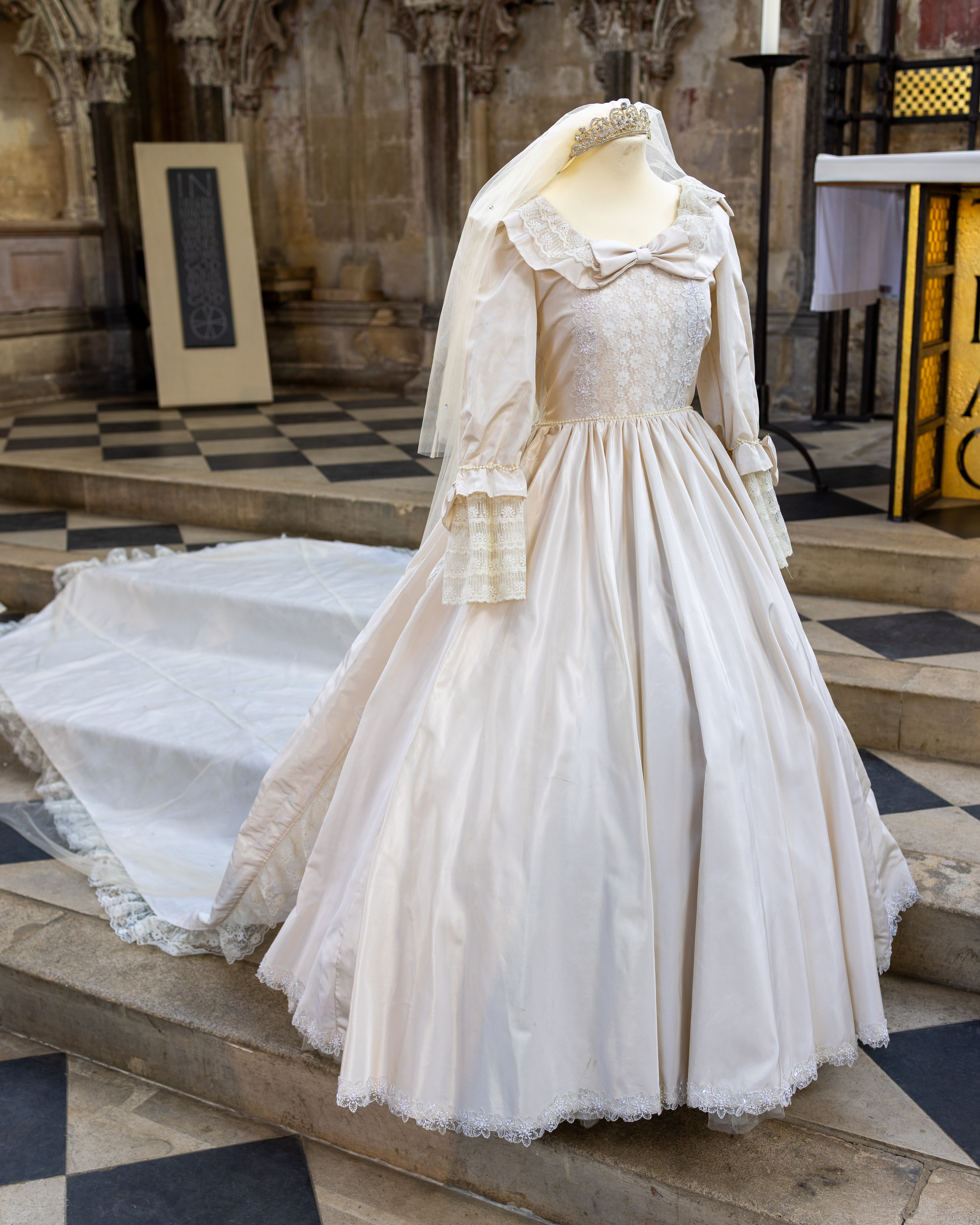
Replica of the dress displayed at Ely Cathedral, 2024

Lady Diana Spencer's bridal gown was an ivory silk taffeta and antique lace gown, with a 25-foot (7.6 m) train and a 153 yards (140 m) tulle veil, valued then at £9,000 (£44,780 in 2026). It was worn at Diana's wedding to Charles, Prince of Wales in 1981 at St Paul's Cathedral. It became one of the most famous dresses in the world, and was considered one of the most closely guarded secrets in fashion history.

== Design ==
The bridal gown was designed by David and Elizabeth Emanuel, who described it as a dress that "had to be something that was going to go down in history, but also something that Diana loved," and which would be "suitably dramatic in order to make an impression." Diana personally selected the designers to make her wedding dress because she was fond of a chiffon blouse they designed for her formal photo session with Lord Snowdon.

The woven silk taffeta was made by Stephen Walters of Suffolk. The Emanuels consulted Maureen Baker, who had made the first wedding dress of Princess Anne, during their construction of the gown. One observer wrote "the dress was a crinoline, a symbol of sexuality and grandiosity, a meringue embroidered with pearls and sequins, its bodice frilled with lace". The gown was decorated with hand embroidery, sequins, and 10,000 pearls, centring on a heart motif. The embroidery was carried out by S Lock now Hand & Lock. An 18-carat gold horseshoe was stitched into the petticoats as a sign of good fortune. The lace used to trim it was antique and hand-made and a square of Carrickmacross lace which had belonged to Queen Mary was attached to the gown. A petite blue bow was also sewn into the interior of the gown's waistband as her "something blue". In contrast, the wedding dress of Catherine Middleton, for her marriage to Prince William, Diana's elder son, incorporated motifs cut from machine-made lace appliquéd to silk net. The dress featured "lace flounces adorning neckline and sleeves".

Fittings of the dress posed difficulties because Diana had developed bulimia and dropped from a size 14 to a size 10 in the months leading up to the wedding. Even the seamstress was concerned about her weight loss and feared the dress might not fit as it should.

The twenty-five-foot (7.6 m) train posed problems. According to writer Andrew Morton, in Diana: Her True Story, the gown's designers realized too late that they had forgotten to allow for the train's length in relation to the size of the glass coach Diana and her father rode in to the ceremony. They found it difficult to fit inside the glass coach, and the train was badly crushed despite Diana's efforts. This accounted for the visible wrinkles in the wedding gown when she arrived at the cathedral.

The Emanuels also created a parasol in a matching taffeta to be used by Diana in case the wedding day turned out to be rainy. Diana also had a spare wedding dress, which would have acted as a stand-in if the dress' design was revealed before the wedding day. The spare dress had tiny pearls sewn on the bodice and was made out of "pale ivory silk taffeta with embroidered scalloped details on the hem and sleeves." It shared some features with Diana's main wedding dress, including a V-neck, three-quarter sleeves and a wide skirt.

== Reception and influence ==
The dress set wedding fashion trends after the wedding. Large puffed sleeves, a full skirt and "soft touch fabrics" became popular requests. Copies by other dressmakers were available "within hours" of the 1981 wedding.

Many bridal experts considered the dress a "gold standard" in wedding fashion in the years after the wedding. Continued appreciation for the dress was not universal. One 2004 bridal magazine listed it as "too much dress, too little princess." Nevertheless, Elizabeth Emanuel noted in 2011 that she still received requests for replicas of Diana's dress.

In his 2003 memoir, A Royal Duty, Paul Burrell wrote that Diana had wanted the dress to be part of the fashion collection of the Victoria and Albert Museum.

The dress toured for many years with the exhibition "Diana: A Celebration", though generally it stayed for only part of the exhibit. Althorp House, Northampton was the prime display location for the dress. Ownership of Diana's dress transferred from her brother to her sons in 2014 because she had requested that her belongings be handed back to them when they both turned 30. Her engagement ring was given to Prince William, while the wedding dress' ownership was given to both Prince William and Prince Harry.

In 2018, the dress was chosen as one of the "Most Influential British Royal Wedding Dresses of All Time" by Time magazine. In 2021, it went on display at Kensington Palace as a part of the "Royal Style in the Making" exhibition.

== See also ==
- Engagement ring of Lady Diana Spencer
- Fashion of Diana, Princess of Wales
  - Travolta dress
  - Revenge dress
- List of individual dresses
