= Elizabeth Emanuel =

British fashion designer

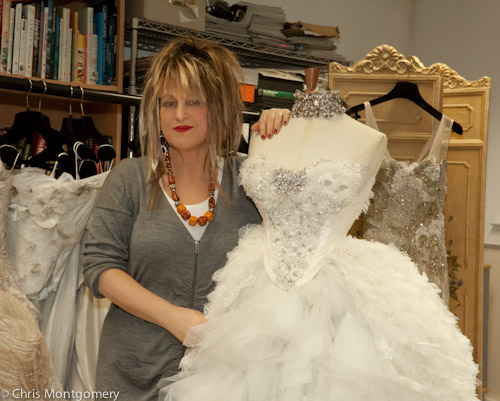
- Elizabeth Emanuel at her Maida Vale studio in 2011
- Born: Elizabeth Florence Weiner; 5 July 1953 (age 73); London, England
- Education: Royal College of Art
- Occupation: Fashion designer
- Years active: 1977–present
- Known for: Wedding dress of Lady Diana Spencer
- Spouse: David Emanuel (m. 1976; div. 1990)

Elizabeth Florence Emanuel (née Weiner, born 5 July 1953) is a British fashion designer who is best known for designing, with her former husband David Emanuel, the wedding dress worn by Lady Diana Spencer on her wedding to Prince Charles in 1981. Since then Elizabeth has developed her own label and worked in costume design for airlines, cinema, pop video and television productions, as well as providing a couture service to some of the world's most famous women.

== Early life ==
Emanuel was born in London to an American father, Samuel Charles (Buddy) Weiner, and British mother, Brahna Betty Weiner. Elizabeth was educated at the City of London School for Girls and then, upon leaving school, she took a year's foundation course at the Harrow School of Art, followed by a three-year diploma course in Fashion Design.

At Harrow she met and married David Emanuel in 1976, and together they became the first married couple to be accepted by the Royal College of Art for a two-year master's degree in Fashion. Her first collection was sold exclusively at Browns.

== Career ==
=== Emanuel Salon ===
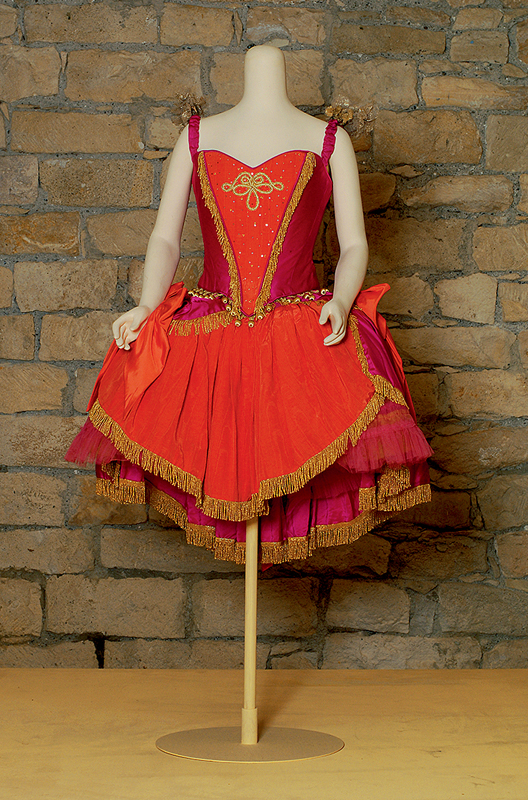
"Circus" evening dress by David & Elizabeth Emanuel, 1989

Following the birth of their two children, Oliver and Eloise; in 1977 the couple launched their own fashion house, Emanuel Salon, in Brook Street, Mayfair. In 1979, they decided to close their ready–to–wear shop, so that they could concentrate on the couture (custom made) side of the business, and became a favourite designer of Lady Diana Spencer before her marriage.

In 1981, the couple were chosen to design the wedding dress of Lady Diana Spencer for her marriage to Charles, Prince of Wales. The dress—seen by over 700 million people worldwide—was made of ivory silk, pure taffeta and antique lace, with 10,000 pearls and sequins, and had a 25 ft train. Of the dress, Lisa Marsh writes in the Fashion Encyclopedia that "Creations by artists from Botticelli to Renoir and Degas were used as influences, as were photographs of some of the more romantic women in history. The garments seen on Greta Garbo in Camille, Vivien Leigh in Gone with the Wind, and Marlene Dietrich in The Scarlet Empress were all recreated to some degree."

A copy of the wedding dress was sold at auction in 2005 for £100,000, twice the original estimate. There was some controversy surrounding the auction. The dress' owners, Madame Tussauds, said that it had been made "in case of any hiccup or disaster", and that it had been tried on by Lady Diana Spencer the morning of her wedding. David Emanuel was quoted by the Western Mail, saying "To say it is a direct replica is untrue. There is no such thing. We did not make one. Diana categorically never tried this dress on, on her wedding day or at any other time, and to my knowledge never even saw it. It wasn't even made to her exact measurements, and we, of course, are the only ones who would know that." The copy of Diana's dress had been given to Madame Tussauds after the wedding in 1981 and was placed on display.

After the 1981 Royal Wedding the Emanuels designed a major part of the Princess of Wales' wardrobe for her Gulf Tour, and appeared with her in an Independent Television documentary entitled In Private - in Public. At this time both the Duchess of Kent and the Duchess of York also became patrons of the Salon.

In 1987 the Emanuel Shop was opened in Beauchamp Place, Knightsbridge, bringing the Emanuels' previously exclusive clothing to the general public. The collections also sold at: Browns, Harrods and Harvey Nichols in London; Bergdorf Goodman, Saks, Henri Bendel, Barneys and Neiman Marcus in the United States.

In 1998, businessman Richard Thompson backed the Elizabeth Emanuel brand.

=== Elizabeth Emanuel ===
After Emanuel and she separated in 1990, and later divorced, Elizabeth retained the Brook Street studio and salon under her label Elizabeth Emanuel. In the same year, Elizabeth was commissioned by The Walt Disney Company, to design a gown for Snow White on the film's 60th anniversary.

In 1991, Emanuel designed the complete range of Virgin Atlantic uniforms, luggage and accessories. She was also asked to design wedding outfits for Sir Richard Branson, Joan and their children for the couple's wedding. Following this, Britannia Airways asked Emanuel to design a brand new image and uniform for staff and cabin crew which was launched in April 1997. In 1995 Emanuel designed the costumes for the full length period feature film, Middleton's Changeling, directed by Marcus Thompson and starring Ian Drury and Billy Connolly, which went on general release in 1999.

To be able to expand the business, in 1997 she went into partnership with Hamlet International. To enable them license new products, she assigned them her business and all its assets, and together, they formed a company called Elizabeth Emanuel Plc. But after it quickly went into administration, the assets and registered trade mark were sold to Frostprint, which changed its name to Elizabeth Emanuel International. Emanuel left after one month, and shortly afterwards the registered trade mark was sold to Oakridge Trading, owned by Manchester businessman Shami Ahmed. After the pair fell out and Emanuel went to court to reclaim her brand, as a result of huge public interest, the BBC filmed two 45-minute documentaries of her work over the course of two years, Frocky Horror Show and Blood on the Carpet. Emanuel lost the case in a landmark hearing.

Contractually tied to either producing public work for a label that she did not own or singular commissions, Emanuel chose to concentrate on the latter. In October 1997 she was commissioned to produce the wedding dress for Estee Lauder's forthcoming international television campaign for the perfume Beautiful, featuring Elizabeth Hurley. In July 1998 she was again commissioned by Estee Lauder for their Pleasures campaign, again featuring Elizabeth Hurley.

From 2001-2002 she worked as the designer for The Luxury Brand Group concentrating on the development of their newly acquired Norman Hartnell brand. In November 2003, Emanuel designed the costumes for a short film starring David Ginola, filmed in France and premièred at the Cannes Film Festival. In May 2004, she designed violinist Vanessa Mae's outfit and her dancers' costumes for the Classic Brit Awards at the Royal Albert Hall. Emanuel created costumes with Mike Batt for his musical The Hunting of the Snark first performed at The Albert Hall.

She designed for the Ballet Rambert and for Robert North's Fabrications by the London Contemporary Dance Theatre. She also designed the costumes for Wayne Eagling's production Frankenstein, The Modern Prometheus.

=== Art of Being ===
In August 2005, she opened her new studio in Little Venice, and attended the launch of her new label Art of Being.

In February 2007, Emanuel completed a multi-feature DVD called Metamorphosis, one of the wedding dresses from which features in the film Outlaw, directed by Nick Love. In the credits, Emanuel's name and the Art of Being brand are both mentioned. In February 2008, Emanuel designed a range of wedding gowns for high street department store chain British Home Stores, and also started creating pieces for both ITV's the X Factor and Britain's Next Top Model.

In 2010, Emanuel formally launched new label Art of Being, which she described as being styled around "the faded grandeur and decadence of Venice at the turn of the century". In a quest for finance to expand the business, she engaged with "Lord" Edward Davenport's finance company Gresham Ltd. After Emanuel deposited £20,000 in approval and due diligence fees, Davenport withdrew the companies offer of a £1 million loan. Davenport was subsequently jailed in September 2011 for his part in a £4.5 million advanced-fee fraud.

In September 2010, Emanuel returned to the catwalk during London Fashion Week showing her Little Black Dress Collection.

== Bibliography ==
- Emanuel, Elizabeth; Emanuel, David (1983). Style for All Seasons. Pavilion Books. ISBN 978-0-907516-13-2.
- Emanuel, Elizabeth; Emanuel, David (2006). A Dress for Diana. Pavilion Books. ISBN 978-1-86205-749-4.
