= Breast Cancer Haven =

Charity in the United Kingdom

Breast Cancer Haven is a charity in the United Kingdom. Founded in 2000 by Sara Davenport, it used to run centres in London, Hereford, Yorkshire, Wessex and West Midlands. Its Leeds branch was opened by singer Kimberley Walsh, who is an ambassador for the charity.

In September 2019, the London Breast Cancer Haven vacated its original building in Effie Road, Fulham, London, and moved first to a location in Baron's Court, Hammersmith, London and then to a location near Kings Cross, London.

By June 2021, Breast Cancer Haven suspended all live services after all staff members were made redundant. However, the charity still provided information, videos and audio support via their website. On 10 February 2023, the charity closed but their self-help resources remain on their website and YouTube.
