= David Emanuel (fashion designer) =

Welsh fashion designer

David Emanuel MBE
- Born: 17 November 1952 (age 74); Bridgend, Wales
- Education: Cardiff School of Art and Design; Harrow School of Art; Royal College of Art, London
- Known for: Fashion designer
- Notable work: Wedding dress of Lady Diana Spencer
- Spouse: Elizabeth Weiner (m. 1976; div. 1990)
- Children: 2
- Awards: Honorary Fellow of the Royal Welsh College of Music & Drama, University of South Wales, Cardiff; Honorary Fellow of the Chartered Society of Designers; Fellow of the Society of Industrial Artists and Designers

David Emanuel MBE (born 17 November 1952) is a Welsh fashion designer who designed, with his wife, Elizabeth, the wedding dress worn by Lady Diana Spencer at her wedding to Prince Charles in 1981.

He participated in the British reality television show I'm a Celebrity...Get Me Out of Here! in 2013 and came runner-up to Westlife singer Kian Egan.

He is the host and creative director of the TLC show Say Yes to the Dress: UK and its spin-off Say Yes to the VEGAS Dress, which sees him in Las Vegas dealing with last minute brides and grooms.

== Early years ==
Born and brought up in Bridgend in Glamorgan, South Wales. Speaking Welsh as his first language, Emanuel attended Porthcawl Secondary School where he excelled in music and art. He became head choir boy at his local church, sang in the County Youth Choir, played violin in the County Youth Orchestra and taught himself to play the cello. He was accepted by the Welsh College of Music & Drama, Cardiff, but chose to study design at Cardiff School of Art and Design (1972–75). He went on to study Fashion Design at Harrow School of Art, London (1974–75), where he met Elizabeth Weiner, whom he married in 1976. David and Elizabeth Emanuel studied design together at the Royal College of Art, London (1976–77), the only married couple the College has accepted.

== Career ==
Emanuel worked for two seasons as an assistant to royal designer Hardy Amies at Savile Row and, aged 25, he launched his own fashion house, Emanuel, in 1977, working in partnership with his wife Elizabeth, with whom he had two children—Oliver and Eloise. They decided to close their ready–to–wear shop in 1979, so that they could concentrate on the couture (custom made) side of the business, and became a favourite designer of Lady Diana Spencer before her marriage. In 1981, the Emanuels were chosen to design the wedding dress worn by Diana. The dress—seen by more than 700 million people worldwide—was made of ivory silk, pure taffeta and antique lace, with 10,000 pearls and sequins, and had a 25 ft train. Of the dress, Lisa Marsh writes in the Fashion Encyclopedia that "Creations by artists from Botticelli to Renoir and Degas were used as influences, as were photographs of some of the more romantic women in history. The garments seen on Greta Garbo in Camille, Vivien Leigh in Gone with the Wind, and Marlene Dietrich in The Scarlet Empress were all recreated to some degree." David continued to dress Diana, Princess of Wales after her wedding.

A copy of Diana's wedding dress made by Emanuel sold at auction in 2005 for £100,000, twice the original estimate. There was some controversy surrounding the auction. The dress's owners, Madame Tussauds, said that it had been made "in case of any hiccup or disaster", and that it had been tried on by Lady Diana Spencer the morning of her wedding. David Emanuel was quoted by the Western Mail, saying "To say it is a direct replica is untrue. There is no such thing. We did not make one. Diana categorically never tried this dress on, on her wedding day or at any other time, and to my knowledge never even saw it. It wasn't even made to her exact measurements, and we, of course, are the only ones who would know that." The copy of Diana's dress had been given to Madame Tussauds after the wedding in 1981 and was placed on display.

Emanuel has dressed some of the world's most famous women: Dame Shirley Bassey, Shakira Caine, Dame Joan Collins, Faye Dunaway, Lesley Garrett, Catherine Zeta-Jones, Patsy Kensit, Madonna, Jane Seymour, Dame Elizabeth Taylor, Ivana Trump and Sophie Ward. The Emanuels opened "The Emanuel Shop" in Beauchamp Place, Knightsbridge, London, in 1987 and sold collections at Harrods and Harvey Nichols in London, and at Henri Bendel, Bergdorf Goodman and Neiman Marcus in New York. Following his divorce from Elizabeth in 1990, Emanuel established the "David Emanuel Couture" label, offering his clients a personal service from his private suite at the Lanesborough Hotel in Knightsbridge, London.

While continuing to present Fashion TV's "Shop the World" programme and to design couture clothing, Emanuel designed his first ready-to-wear bridal collection, for Berketex Brides, in 2008. He launched a collection for the UK women's clothing chain Bonmarche. In July 2010, he was made a fellow of the University of Wales Institute, Cardiff (UWIC), having previously studied for a Foundation diploma in the university's Cardiff School of Art and Design.

== Media ==
The "Diana" dress was a defining moment in Emanuel's career. His profile soared and he became a household name. As well as allowing them to arrange licensing agreements for items such as perfume, linens and sunglasses, Emanuel's opinion on fashion and trends was often sought and he has been interviewed by the main journalists and talk show hosts in Britain and by some in the United States such as Barbara Walters, Jane Pauley, Merv Griffin and Joan Rivers.

Emanuel became a television presenter, creating the ABC Television character the Frock Doctor—visiting the homes of members of the public to advise on, and restyle their wardrobe. HTV broadcast a 75-minute documentary profile (24 February 1994) of Emanuel in the series Slice of Life and in 1995, Emanuel produced and presented a ten-part fashion series for the same company, which established him as a television presenter and executive producer. He has appeared regularly as a fashion consultant on magazine programmes including the BBC show Summer Scene, Swank—co-presented with actress Margi Clarke—Designed by Emanuel and, more recently, Fashion TV's Shop the World, which has run since 2003 and been syndicated across the United States and 39 other countries. Emanuel has hosted several other television style shows: The David Emanuel Fashion Show, The Make-Over Show and The David Emanuel Ultimate Make-Over-Show.

Cookery programmes marked a departure from fashion for Emanuel. He hosted the Out to Lunch series, in which he cooked for celebrity guests, and Cooking with David Emanuel, lunch at his home in Windsor, Berkshire and Ladies Who Lunch—a chat show over lunch. He also writes a weekly "Style" column in the Western Mail, the national newspaper of Wales.

A fluent speaker of Welsh, Emanuel hosted the BBC Two programme on the National Eisteddfod of Wales (Welsh: Eisteddfod Genedlaethol Cymru). As a guest of Peter Karrie on The Peter Karrie Show, Emanuel sang The Queen of Disguise, before being interviewed with one of his clients, the actress Joan Collins. BBC Wales invited Emanuel to be a guest at its 75th Anniversary Concert, where he sang three songs in Welsh before an audience of four thousand people.

== Design ==
Emanuel's wardrobe and set design portfolio includes:

- Set designer for Cinderella—premiered at the Richmond Theatre, London, and went on to be staged at the London Palladium, Cinderella had a cast over its five-year run that included Lionel Blair, David Essex, Patsy Kensit, Dame Anna Neagle, Paul Nicholas, and Des O'Connor—and Frankenstein; or, The Modern Prometheus—premiered by The Royal Ballet at the Royal Opera House, Covent Garden, and later staged at La Scala, Milan.
- Wardrobe designer for several actresses: Jane Seymour in War and Remembrance—the award-winning television film, of Herman Wouk's novel—; Susan Hampshire in House Guests—the Francis Durbridge thriller, at the Savoy Theatre, London—; Lulu in Andrew Lloyd Webber's Song and Dance—; and Siân Phillips as 'The Snow Queen'—in "Joy to the World", the annual Christmas spectacular at The Royal Albert Hall, London.
- Styling the cast of Andrew Lloyd Webber's musical Sunset Boulevard at the Sydmonton Festival before its West End opening.
- Designing for and styling Lesley Garrett, including designing her concert performances and her BBC2 show, Viva la Diva – A Night at the Opera with Lesley Garrett. One of the dresses David designed for Lesley—red silk taffeta and crinoline—became the inspiration for her album Soprano in Red (1995).

As well as designing sets and costumes for ballet, film, concert, music videos, ad campaigns, theatre and television productions, Emanuel has completed commissions to design a complete range of uniforms and accessories for Virgin Atlantic, in 1991, and the Britannia Airways flight attendant uniforms, in 1999.

== Honours ==
Emanuel was appointed Member of the Order of the British Empire (MBE) in the 2026 Birthday Honours for charitable service, recognising his work with Macmillan Cancer Support.

== Bibliography ==
- Emanuel, David; Emanuel, Elizabeth (1983). Style for All Seasons. Pavilion Books. ISBN 978-0-907516-13-2.
- Emanuel, David; Emanuel, Elizabeth (2006). A Dress for Diana. Pavilion Books. ISBN 978-1-86205-749-4.
