= Revenge dress =

Dress once worn by Diana, Princess of Wales

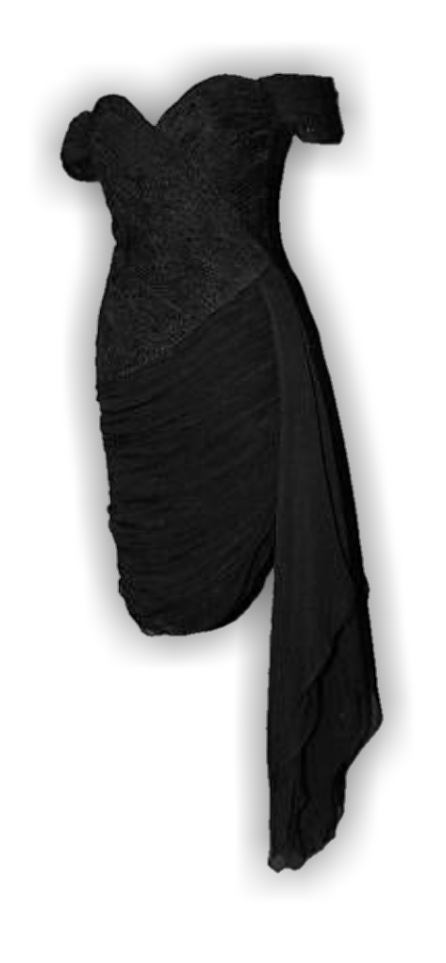
- Designer: Christina Stambolian
- Year: 1994
- Type: Black off-the-shoulder evening gown
- Material: Silk, chiffon

The "revenge dress" is an evening gown worn by Diana, Princess of Wales, to a 1994 dinner at the Serpentine Gallery in Kensington Gardens. The garment has been interpreted as having been worn "in revenge" for the televised admission of adultery by her husband Charles, then Prince of Wales.

== Design ==
The gown, designed by Christina Stambolian, was made of black silk crepe with an off-the-shoulder neckline, a crisscrossed pleated bodice, a diagonally draped chiffon skirt and a flowing side-swept train. In September 1991, Diana visited Stambolian's boutique on Beauchamp Place in London with her brother, Charles Spencer, 9th Earl Spencer, and commissioned a cocktail dress. According to Stambolian, Diana initially considered an off-white design and thought some of the proposed sketches were more revealing than she was accustomed to wearing. She eventually agreed to a black dress made with silk jacquard and chiffon, with fabric ordered from Como, Italy. Stambolian received payment of £900 on 21 October 1991. According to Claudia Joseph's book Diana: A Life in Dresses, two dressmakers spent more than 60 hours making the dress by hand. In a September 2026 interview, Stambolian said that she had worked extensively on the dress while visiting Volos, Greece, where she grew up. She explained that the natural light helped her see the intricate details of the black fabric, and that she subsequently took the garment back to London. Stambolian compared Diana's choice of black to the black swan Odile in Tchaikovsky's ballet Swan Lake, saying that Diana "chose not to play the scene like Odette, innocent in white. She played it like Odile. She was clearly angry." In an interview originally published in 2022, Stambolian said that she disliked the term "revenge dress", explaining that Diana had commissioned the garment in 1991 without intending it for the 1994 event. Diana had owned the dress for three years before she wore it, fearing it was "too daring". The dress cost £900 (equivalent to £2,100 in 2025). Diana initially planned to wear a dress by Valentino, but reportedly changed her choice after the fashion house issued a press release announcing the outfit before the event.

== History ==
External image
- Princess Diana wearing the revenge dress, 1994

Diana wore the dress to a fundraising dinner on 29 June 1994 hosted by Vanity Fair for the Serpentine Gallery in Kensington Gardens. She had initially declined the invitation; however, two days before the dinner, following several days of publicity surrounding Charles's infidelity revelations, she accepted. A television programme about Charles was broadcast, in which he admitted to having been unfaithful to her after their marriage had "irretrievably broken down". Charles and Diana had separated two years before the broadcast. Diana's biographer Sarah Bradford wrote that Diana "feigned indifference" towards the programme.

Diana was photographed wearing the dress as she exited her car and was greeted by Lord Palumbo, the chair of the trustees of the Serpentine Gallery, before entering the gallery. The photographer who captured her arrival, Tim Graham, said that the moment lasted only 30 seconds, and that Diana would have known a large number of photographers would be present following Charles's revelations. Palumbo later recalled that Diana "bounded out of the car in that wonderfully athletic way that she had".

Following the dinner, the dress was described as the "I'll Show You dress", the "Serpentine Cocktail", the "Vengeance dress", and the "Revenge dress". In her 2007 book The Diana Chronicles, Tina Brown wrote that fashion editors referred to it as "her fuck-you dress".

The dress was sold at auction in June 1997 for £39,098 (equivalent to £77,100 in 2025) to a Scottish couple who planned to use it to raise money for children's charities. It was exhibited in the Museum of Style in Newbridge, County Kildare, in their 2017 exhibition Diana: A Fashion Legacy, where it was described as "the most important exhibit". Penny Goldstone wrote in Marie Claire in 2020 that the dress remains one of Diana's "most iconic styles of all time". In September 2026, it was reported that the dress would be exhibited in London, Hong Kong, Geneva, and New York, before being offered for sale at a fashion evening auction at Sotheby's in New York on 9 December, with part of the proceeds benefiting NHS Lothian Charity.

== Styling ==
The dress was styled with black silk Manolo Blahnik pumps, a black silk and velvet Salvatore Ferragamo envelope clutch, and sheer black tights. Her jewellery included Collingwood pearl-drop earrings, a sapphire-and-diamond bracelet, her sapphire engagement ring, and a seven-strand pearl choker centred on a large sapphire-and-diamond brooch originally presented to her by Queen Elizabeth the Queen Mother as a wedding gift. Diana had previously worn the sapphire-and-diamond piece as a brooch before having it incorporated into the seven-strand pearl choker by 1985. She completed the ensemble with red nail polish and her short hair swept back, emphasising the dress's neckline and the choker. The combination of a comparatively daring cocktail dress with traditional royal pearls and sapphires has been interpreted as marking a transition from more restrained royal wardrobe towards a more independent public image.

== Aftermath ==
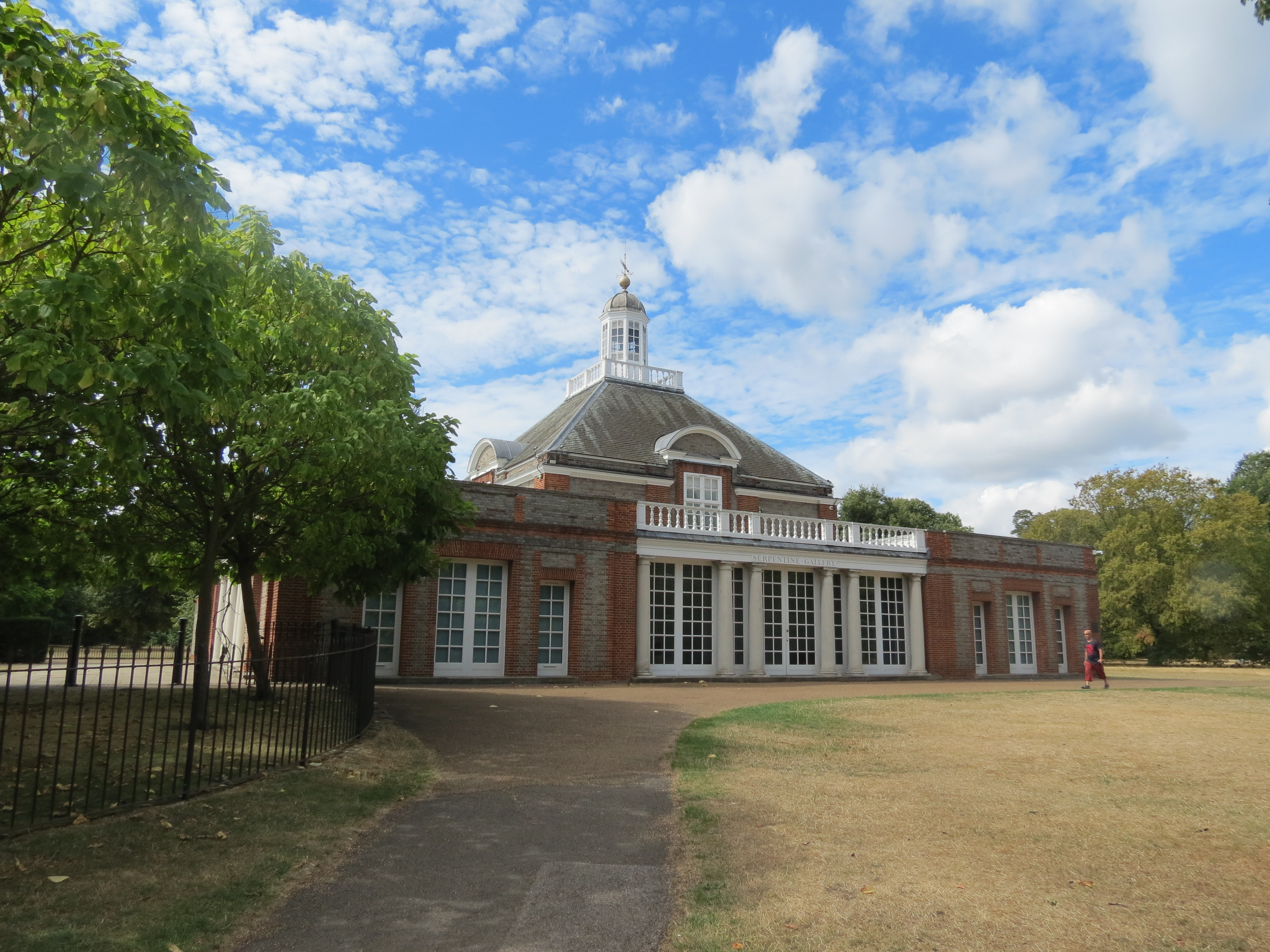
The Serpentine Gallery in 2018

The day after the event, The Daily Telegraph wrote:

The Princess of Wales did not have to dine out before the television cameras at the Serpentine Gallery last night in order to avoid seeing her husband sharing his soul with the nation on the box. She could have watched a video, played bridge or simply washed her hair and curled up in bed [...] It's amazing what some people will do to avoid press speculation.

Elle Pithers, writing for Vogue, described the dress as the "progenitor of 'revenge dressing'". In 2020, writing for The Daily Telegraph, Bethan Holt stated that the dress encompassed "the act of reclaiming the narrative" and was the "ultimate modern example of revenge dressing", in an article about women who have found inspiration in Diana's choice of the dress. Holt wrote, "Hell hath no fury like a woman scorned. But also: fashion hath no greater thrill than when being deployed for the purpose of expressing rage, froideur or an insouciant dose of 'look what you're missing'".

The dress was analysed by Caroline McCauley in Fashion, Agency, and Empowerment: Performing Agency, Following Script, and interpreted as part of Diana's couture of "revenge" following the dissolution of her marriage to Charles after years of having "snippets of a seductive glamour hidden by a proper royal purity". McCauley wrote that instead of "cowering in shame" following Charles's admission, "Diana arrived in a figure-hugging black silk dress with a pearl choker necklace, black pumps, and scarlet lipstick and nail polish". Georgina Howell, in her 1998 book Diana, Her Life in Fashion, wrote that the dress was "possibly the most strategic dress ever worn by a woman in modern times", describing it as a "devastating wisp of black chiffon" with which Diana "flipped her husband clean off the front pages" following the broadcast. "The Thrilla He Left to Woo Camilla" was the headline of The Sun the next day.

In 2025, a wax statue of Diana wearing a replica of the dress was placed in Musée Grévin. In May 2026, The Daily Telegraph reported that a Jaguar used by Diana at the time of her appearance in the dress was placed for auction, with estimates suggesting it could sell for around £100,000.

== See also ==
- Fashion of Diana, Princess of Wales
  - Travolta dress
  - Wedding dress of Lady Diana Spencer
