= Lady Dior =

Women's handbag by Christian Dior

- Type: Handbag
- Inventor: Gianfranco Ferré
- Inception: 1994
- Manufacturer: Christian Dior SE
- Available: Yes
- Website: https://www.dior.com/en_us/fashion/womens-fashion/bags/handbags?collection_filter=Lady%20Dior

Lady Dior is a commercial name given to a handbag by the Christian Dior company in honor of Diana, Princess of Wales. It was designed by Gianfranco Ferré in 1994 under the name Chouchou, and was later renamed as Princesse before being renamed as Lady Dior. French actress Marion Cotillard was the ambassador of Lady Dior for nine years, from 2008 to 2017, even designing her own handbag for the brand in 2012.

== History ==
In 1995, Bernadette Chirac wished to give Diana, Princess of Wales, a unique handbag on the occasion of her visit to Paris. When France's first lady contacted Dior in her search for such a bag, the House offered her a model designed by Gianfranco Ferré in 1994, unofficially named Chouchou ("favorite" in French) at the time. It was officially renamed as Princesse in the short term.

The bag, black in color, was presented to the former Lady Diana at the inauguration of the Cézanne (Note: In 1995, the Cézanne exhibition in Paris was partly financed by LVMH - Moët Hennessy Louis Vuitton, a subsidiary of the Christian Dior holding company.) exhibition at the Grand Palais. It was often photographed carried by Diana at public events: she had it with her in Birmingham during an official visit; again a few weeks later during a stay in Argentina; then on several further occasions. Her accessories also signified true appreciation of luxury, beyond expected brands to be worn by a British princess, and her personal relationships with the world's most prestigious houses. It was soon being described as "iconic", and "legendary", and was launched in larger series, with its name changed to Lady Dior. Two hundred thousand models were sold in two years and Dior's leather goods turnover increased tenfold. The bag in turn gave its name to a watch in 1999 and inspired a makeup product by Parfums Christian Dior.

In June 2025, Dior unveiled a reimagined version of the Lady Dior handbag, a collaboration between Dior's new creative director Jonathan Anderson and textile artist Sheila Hicks; the handbag made its debut at Anderson’s Spring Summer 2026, his inaugural collection for the Dior.

== Characteristics ==
Lady Dior is a handbag that adopts Dior's graphic codes and is generally decorated with a cannage (Note: Caning is a recurring decorative element at Dior; it is found on the Lady Dior, but also on jewelry or on the facade of the Dior building in Japan.) (caning) motif inspired by two items of furniture found in Dior's private mansion on Avenue Montaigne since 19473: the Napoléon III chairs on which the couturier seated the guests at his runway shows, and the back of a neo-Louis XVI medallion armchair Louis XV. The bag is composed of one hundred and forty four pieces in total and is rectangular and rigid, with the four gold- or silver-tone D-I-O-R letters and the Dior logo suspended from the handle as charms. It is available in different materials featuring various techniques (leather, velvet, microfiber, satin, denim, python, crocodile, tweed, jacquard, etc.), and in several sizes.

An iteration of the bag called Lady D-Lite was introduced by the fashion house in 2019, which features a reversible and removable shoulder strap. It was notably carried by Diana's daughter-in-law, Meghan, Duchess of Sussex, at an event in 2021. Queen Camilla has also carried Lady Dior bags on at least two separate occasions.

== Advertising ==
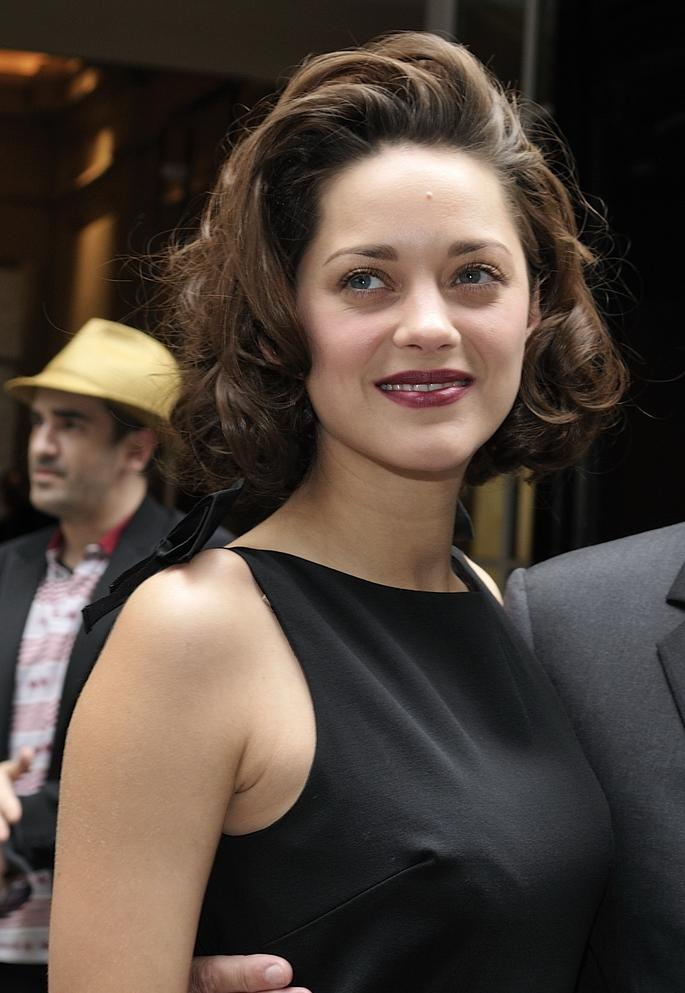
Marion Cotillard was the face of the Lady Dior handbag from 2008 to 2017.

Chosen by designer John Galliano, French actress Marion Cotillard became the face of Lady Dior in 2008, a role she played until 2017.

In addition to multiple publications in the press photos by Peter Lindbergh, Craig McDean, Tim Walker and Jean-Baptiste Mondino, Cotillard starred in several short film commercials, mainly intended to be released on the internet. The first was The Lady Noire Affair, directed by Olivier Dahan, followed by Lady Rouge by Jonas Åkerlund. The latter followed a series of photos by Annie Leibovitz. Next came Lady Blue Shanghai, a sixteen-minute film directed by David Lynch. Two more films were directed by John Cameron Mitchell in 2011; Lady Grey London, a seven-minute silent film co-starring Ian McKellen, and L.A.dy Dior. Cotillard recalled, "I suggested this director [Mitchell] to Dior. They didn't know him, but they haven't wanted to let him go since!"

The CEO of Christian Dior Couture, Sidney Toledano, said of these short films that the "strategic objective is to make people dream by telling beautiful stories".

In 2012, Cotillard starred in the web-series Lady Dior Web Documentary, and wrote and performed the song "Lily's Body" for one episode. She also designed her own handbag for Lady Dior, the "360° bag".

In 2014, Cotillard wrote and co-directed alongside Eliott Bliss, a music video for her song "Snapshot in LA", especially for Lady Dior's campaign "Enter The Game – Dior Cuise 2015".

== Exhibition ==
Organized by Dior, a touring exhibition six years in the making and entitled Lady Dior As Seen By traveled to China, Japan, Italy, and Brazil from 2012 onwards. It presented over a hundred works by photographers – the likes of Patrick Demarchelier, Bruce Weber and Ellen Von Unwerth – visual artists, sculptors, designers and painters, all inspired by the Lady Dior bag. As all the collaboration with famous artists, Lady Dior has been seen as the bond of art and fashion.

== In popular culture ==
In 2022, the bag was featured in the season five of the Netflix series The Crown carried by actress Elizabeth Debicki, who portrayed Diana, Princess of Wales.

== Celebrity ambassadors ==
- Carla Bruni (1996)
- Monica Bellucci (2006–2007)
- Marion Cotillard (2008–2017)

== See also ==
- Diorissimo
