= Gianfranco Ferré =

Italian fashion designer (1944–2007)

- Ferré in 2003
- Born: 15 August 1944; Legnano, Italy
- Died: 17 June 2007 (aged 62); Milan, Italy
- Education: Polytechnic University of Milan
- Labels: Gianfranco Ferré; Ferré; GF Ferré
- Awards: Occhio d'Oro (6 times); De d'Or; Commendatore dell'Ordine

Gianfranco Ferré (Italian pronunciation: [dʒaɱˈfraŋko ferˈre]; 15 August 1944 – 17 June 2007) was an Italian fashion designer also known as "the architect of fashion" for his background and his original attitude toward creating fashion design.

== Early life and education ==
Ferré was born on 15 August 1944 in Legnano, near Milan in Lombardy, in northern Italy, the first child of Luigi Ferré and Andrea Morosi. He attended the liceo scientifico of Legnano, and then, from 1963, studied architecture at the Polytechnic University of Milan in central Milan, where he graduated in 1969.

== Early career ==
Ferré began his fashion career in 1970 by designing accessories, then worked as a raincoat designer in 1972–74. He started his own company Baila in 1974, and launched his signature collection for women in 1978. His first men's collection appeared in 1982, followed in 1986 by his first couture collection in Rome.

Ferré became Stylistic Director of Christian Dior in Paris in 1989, when he was chosen by owner Bernard Arnault to replace Marc Bohan. In 1994, Ferré designed the Lady Dior handbag. In 1996, it was announced that Ferré would end his engagement with Dior with the Spring 1997 collection for the label.

== Gianfranco Ferré S.p.A. ==
=== History ===
Ferré founded his eponymous womenswear line in 1978 and in the same year founded the Gianfranco Ferré company. He kept his own line in Italy while he worked at Dior. His own label is more relaxed and pared-down than Dior. Sophisticated white shirts have become the symbol of his personal signature in fashion design.

The company achieved total sales of 950 billion Lira ($589 million) in 1994, an increase of 15% over 1993, which had enjoyed a similar increase over 1992 sales. Ferré's 14 licenses contributed 58% to total sales in 1994. In 1996, total sales were already at 1250 billion Lira ($811 million).

The Gianfranco Ferré S.p.A. is the holding company that coordinates the fashion business of the Ferré label. It was owned by Gianfranco Ferré (Creative Director) and Franco Mattioli (Chief Financial Officer) in equal shares until it was sold to IT Holdings in March 2002. Recently, Ferré announced that the group plans to become listed at the Milan stock exchange. In order to prepare for this movement Ferré started to rearrange the holding significantly. The first step was the recruitment of experienced management personnel under the guidance of Giuseppe Cipriano. The next step is the reduction of the number of subsidiaries from today 21 to four or five in the future. Another move is the acquisition of the apparel producer Dei Mattioli, which is owned by Mattioli. Ferré also seems to be interested in acquiring some of his contractors, in order to have more control over the production.

In 2000, Gianfranco Ferré sold 90 per cent of his company to Gruppo Tonino Perna, the parent company of the Italian fashion group IT Holding SpA, for a sum estimated by analysts to be between $150 million and $175 million.

From 2007 to 2008, Lars Nilsson served as the label's creative director for only five months; Nilsson's first and only menswear collection for the Gianfranco Ferré was shown in an unusual "presentation" style, with static models in a theatrical setting and no catwalk show. From April 2008 to April 2011, designers Tommaso Aquilano and Roberto Rimondi followed; they were let go from the company due to poor sales.

In 2008, Chinese businessman Billy Ngok entered into negotiations to buy a minority stake in the Gianfranco Ferré label from IT Holding. In 2009, three years after Ferré died, IT Holding itself went into bankruptcy administration. In 2010, Italy cleared the sale of Gianfranco Ferré to U.S. private equity firm Prodos Capital. In 2011, Dubai-based retailer Paris Group bought the company.

=== Product lines ===
- Gianfranco Ferré: Main line for men, women and children
- Ferré: Previously known as the White Label, more practical, ready-to-wear for both men and women. Within this line, there are Ferré Red (for plus size) and Ferré Fur. For Ferré men there is also Ferré Underwear.
- GF Ferré: Younger, more sporty line, for men, women
- GF Ferré Watches: Sophisticated designs of watches for men and women.
- Gianfranco Ferré Fragrances
- Ferre Milano: Casual line for women and men
- Ferre designed Korean Air's flight attendant uniforms in 2005, using Korean "binyeo" traditional hair accessories.

Ferré later branched out into jewellery, children's wear and a spa venture with British company ESPA. In 2008, Gianfranco Ferré and Galadari Investment Office announced plans to build a luxurious $1.2 billion tower of at least 60 floors in Dubai in 2011, part of a joint venture for the design and development of real estate.

=== Production/licenses ===
Though no longer under production, the Studio .0001 and Forma O were produced by Marzotto, one of the biggest Italian garment manufacturers. The sportswear collections Oaks by Ferré and Ferrejeans used to be manufactured by Italiana Manifatture S.p.A., but Ferré contracted those lines for the next ten years to Ittiere, who also furnish the bride collections of Dolce & Gabbana, Versace, and others. The range of licensed products is wide, including shoes, stationery, luggage, home furnishings, and perfumes (Gianfranco Ferre Fragrances). The latest addition to this list is the license given to the Swiss watch manufacturer Swatch.

Most of the external licenses were eliminated in 2003, leaving only the Gianfranco Ferre mainline, Ferré diffusion, and GF Ferré younger/activewear labels.

=== Exports ===
70% of Ferré sales are achieved in export, where the US appears to be the biggest market with growing importance. Italy still holds 20% of the sales, but the success of the Ferré Jeans business in the US seems to shift the focus here. The Studio .0001 by Ferré line, produced by Italian garment manufacturer Marzotto, is basically targeted at the US market.

=== Distribution ===
Ferré distributes in 17 exclusive boutiques worldwide (1994) and has over 250 sales points in total.

=== Sports sponsoring ===
GF Ferré designed the official off-field uniform for Rome-based soccer club S.S. Lazio for the upcoming 2009-2010 soccer season.

== Recognition ==
Ferré won a number of prestigious awards including the L'Occhio d'Oro during his career:

- Occhio d'Oro Award (six times) for Best Italian Designer
- Gold Medal from the City of Milan
- Commendatore del Ordine decoration from the President of the Italian Republic
- De d'Or (Golden Thimble Award) for his first Dior haute couture collection (1989)

== Personal life ==
Ferré appeared to be extremely critical of trends and fashion gimmicks. He dealt with his demanding schedule, being responsible for a French top fashion brand and his own Italian label, by commuting between Milan and Paris in his private plane. Ferré had a 460 m^{2} (5,000 sq ft) lakeside home on the western bank of Lake Maggiore, near Milan.

== Death ==
Ferré died on 17 June 2007 at the San Raffaele Hospital in Milan after having suffered a brain haemorrhage.

Ferré was buried in his home town of Legnano. Fellow designers Giorgio Armani, Valentino Garavani and Donatella Versace attended the service.
