= Victor Edelstein =

London-based couturier

- Born: 10 July 1946 (age 80); London, England
- Occupation: Fashion designer
- Known for: Dresses of Diana, Princess of Wales, including the Travolta dress
- Spouse: Annamaria Succi
- Website: http://victoredelstein.com/

Victor Edelstein (born 10 July 1946) is a British former couturier best known for his fashion designs for Diana, Princess of Wales, in the 1980s. In 1989 he was described as the English equivalent to Oscar de la Renta, and "the master of the English thoroughbred look". He now works as a painter.

== Early career ==
Edelstein was born in North London to a Jewish family. In 1962 he began working as a trainee designer for Alexon. As well as Alexon and Salvador, he worked for Nettie Vogues, Clifton Slimline, and Biba. In 1970 he launched his own label although it was short-lived. He then went on to spend three years working for the London branch of Christian Dior S.A. under the direction of Jorn Langberg, before re-establishing his label in 1978. In 1982, Edelstein decided to focus exclusively on haute couture, and also designed for the theatre and ballet.

== Clients ==
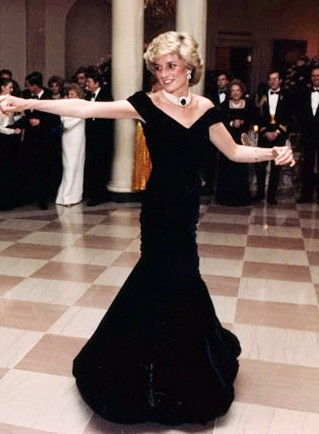
Diana, Princess of Wales, wearing her Victor Edelstein Travolta gown at the White House in 1985.

Edelstein's workroom was based at Stanhope Mews West, London. His most famous design is probably the ink-blue velvet gown he created in 1985 for Diana, Princess of Wales, to wear to the White House, where she danced with actor John Travolta. This dress, on both occasions it sold at auction, set world record prices for a dress worn by Diana (£137,000 ($222,500) in 1996, and £240,000 ($362,424) in 2013). In addition to Diana, his clients included the Duchess of Kent, the Princess of Hanover, Princess Michael of Kent, the Countess of Snowdon, Anna Wintour, Tina Brown, Michael Heseltine's wife Anne, and Lady Nuttall, who commented that Edelstein's workroom was the only place her husband liked to accompany her when clothes-shopping. In the late 1980s, his prices were often around the £2,400 to £2,500 mark for an evening dress, with his clients typically buying three or four outfits each season (an evening gown, a suit, and one or two dinner dresses).

== Later years ==
Edelstein closed his fashion house in 1993, explaining that there was no longer a market for luxurious custom-made clothing. Since then, he has established himself as an artist, exhibiting his work throughout Europe and the United States. His portrait of Judith Martin, the American etiquette authority known as 'Miss Manners', was commissioned by her husband as a 70th birthday present for her, and now hangs in the National Portrait Gallery, Washington. His wife, Annamaria Succi, is also a painter.
