= Travolta dress =

Dress once owned by Diana, Princess of Wales

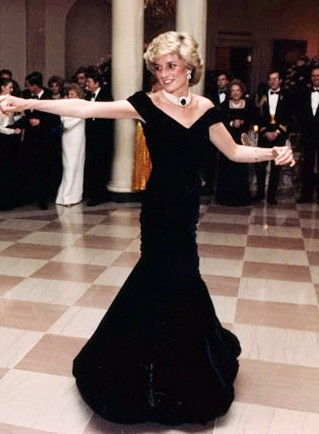
- Designer: Victor Edelstein
- Year: 1985
- Type: Midnight blue off-the-shoulder evening gown
- Material: Velvet

The Travolta dress is a dress once owned by Diana, Princess of Wales. It was worn for the first time at a gala dinner at the White House in November 1985. It is named after the American actor John Travolta, with whom the princess danced at the dinner.

== Design ==
Designed by London-born Victor Edelstein, the Travolta dress is an off-the-shoulder midnight blue velvet evening gown. It was inspired by Edwardian fashion, giving it a "slight sweep of costume drama". The journalist Jackie Modlinger described it as "dramatic in style" and "regal in fabric".

== History ==
Edelstein recalls the Princess saw a burgundy version of the dress in his studio and requested it be made for her in midnight blue. The fittings for the gown took place in her private apartments at Kensington Palace. After the fitting, the Princess was so delighted with the final result that she rushed to show it to her husband, Charles, Prince of Wales. He reputedly told her she looked wonderful in the gown and that it would be perfect to wear with jewels.

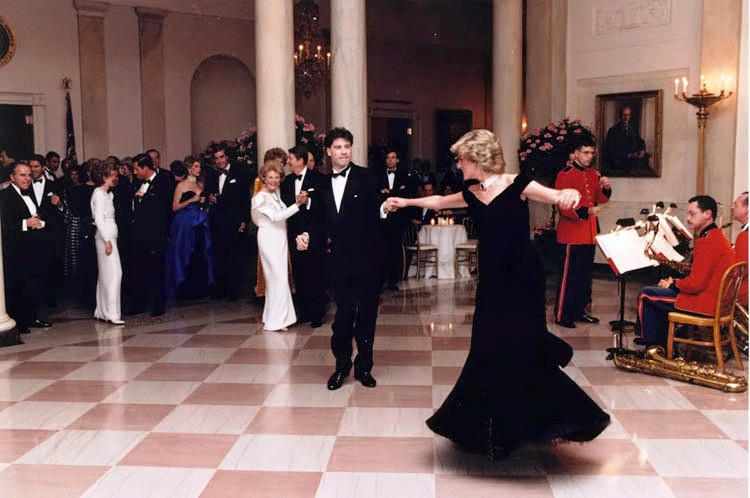
The Princess of Wales dancing with John Travolta at the White House, 9 November 1985

Diana visited the United States in 1985 with Prince Charles. The couple stayed at the White House, where they attended a gala dinner on 9 November. On that occasion, the Princess of Wales wore Edelstein's dress. She was photographed dancing with actor John Travolta in the Entrance Hall to the music of his 1977 film Saturday Night Fever. The photographs and TV footage of them "gliding around the room" were widely circulated around the world, and the gown came to be known as the "Travolta dress".

The Princess of Wales wore the dress again in Germany in 1987 and at the premiere of Oliver Stone's film Wall Street in 1988. She wore it for her last official portrait photograph, taken by the Earl of Snowdon, in 1997.

== Auctions ==
Shortly before her death in a car crash in Paris in 1997, Diana requested that the dress be sold in a charity auction. Florida-based businesswoman Maureen Dunkel bought it for £100,000 in New York in June 1997, along with nine other dresses formerly owned by the Princess. The Travolta dress was the most expensive one sold at the auction. When she went bankrupt in 2011, Dunkel was forced to put them up for auction, but the Travolta dress was one of six that were not sold. It was finally auctioned off by Kerry Taylor in London on 19 March 2013, fetching £240,000 ($362,424) and again being the most expensive auctioned dress. It was bought by "a British gentleman as a surprise to cheer up his wife".

In 2019, it sold for £264,000 ($325,317) to Historic Royal Palaces, a charity which looks after royal memorabilia including clothing and artifacts. The dress has joined the Royal Ceremonial Dress Collection and belongs to the palace. The dress was placed on public display in Kensington Palace, 20 years after it first left.

== See also ==
- Revenge dress
- Wedding dress of Lady Diana Spencer
- List of individual dresses
