= People's princess =

Sobriquet given to Diana, Princess of Wales

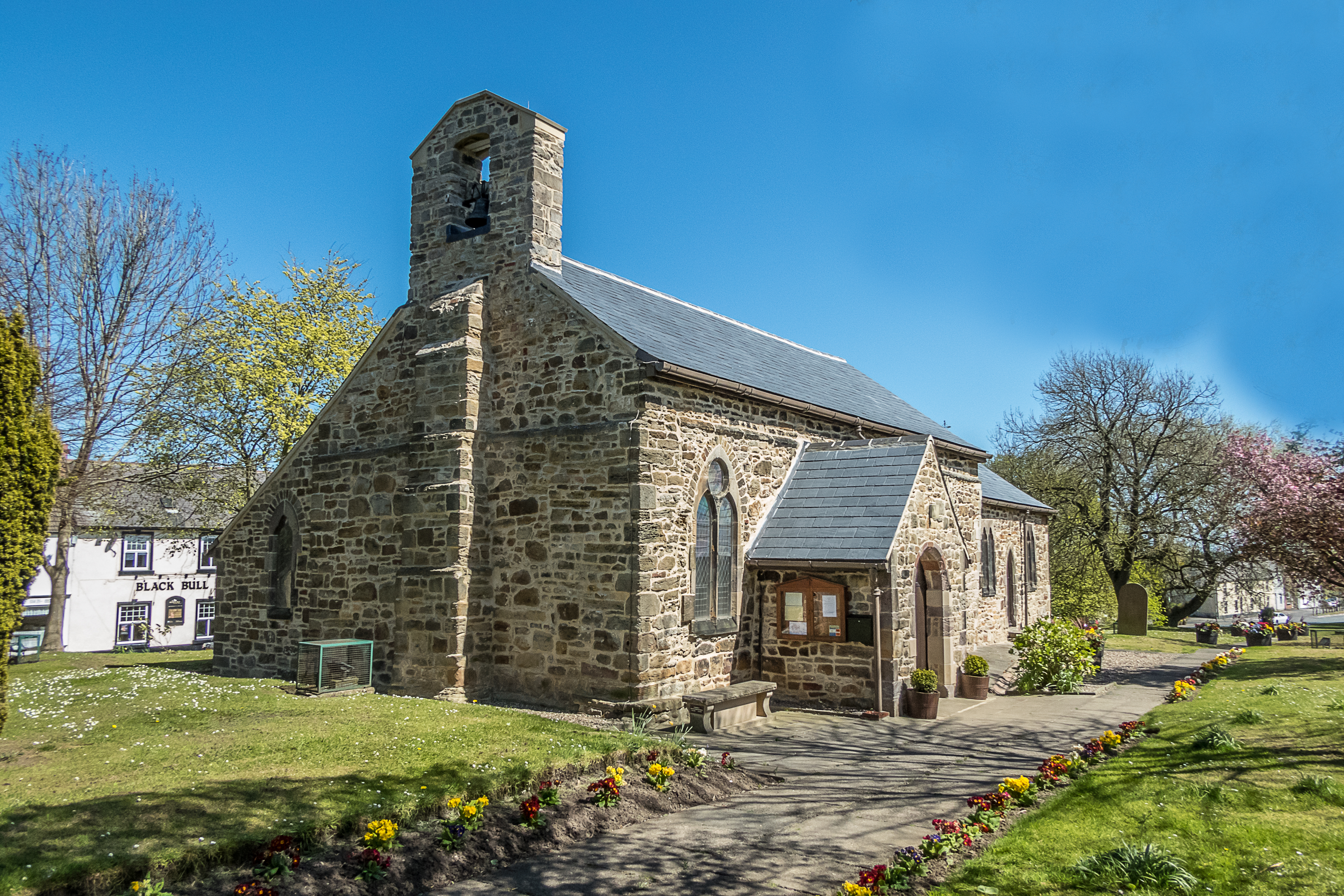
The church of St Mary Magdalene, Trimdon, where Blair delivered his remarks on Diana's death

The term "people's princess" is a sobriquet used on 31 August 1997 by the prime minister of the United Kingdom, Tony Blair to describe Diana, Princess of Wales, following her death earlier that day. The term had first been applied to Diana in a 1992 article by Julie Burchill in the Modern Review, when she described Diana as "the one and only People's – and Pop's – Princess".

== Origin ==
Diana had died in the early hours of 31 August 1997; the British royal family had released a short statement that said that they were "deeply shocked and distressed" by the news of her death. The statement was perceived as insufficient for the level of public grief. Blair wrote that the royals' response was "all very by the book but it took no account of the fact that people couldn't give a damn about the book" and that he tried "to protect the monarchy, channel the anger before it became rage, and generally have the whole business emerge in a positive and unifying way rather than be a source of tension, division and bitterness".

Blair made a statement on Diana's death outside the church of St Mary Magdalene, in Trimdon, in his parliamentary constituency of Sedgefield where he and his family had gone to attend that Sunday's church service. After offering his condolences to her family and describing his shock at her death, Blair said that Diana was "a wonderful and a warm human being, although her own life was often sadly touched by tragedy. She touched the lives of so many others in Britain and throughout the world with joy and with comfort" and that "With just a look or a gesture that spoke so much more than words, she would reveal to all of us the depth of her compassion and her humanity". Blair concluded his statement by saying that "We know how difficult things were for her from time to time. I am sure we can only guess that. But people everywhere, not just here in Britain, kept faith with Princess Diana. They liked her, they loved her, they regarded her as one of the people. She was the People's Princess and that is how she will stay, how she will remain in our hearts and our memories for ever".

== Aftermath ==
In his 2010 autobiography, A Journey, Blair recounted that the phrase "now sounds like something from another age. And corny. And over the top. And all the rest of it. But at the time it felt natural and I thought, particularly, that she would have approved" and that it captured "how she saw herself, and it was how she should be remembered". Blair felt that the phrase "captured the way she touched people's lives" and did so in a way that "acknowledged her own life hadn't been smooth or easy". Blair felt that people loved that "she was a princess but still vulnerable ... capable of healing their wounds because she herself knew what it was like to be wounded". Blair had prepared the statement with Alastair Campbell, the Downing Street Press Secretary and Prime Minister's Official Spokesperson, and had written it on the back of an envelope.

The Times Guide to the House of Commons described the term as "quintessentially Blairite" and that it was "a bold and opportunistic move – Mr Blair grabbed a weeping Britain and hugged it to his breast".

The mockumentary photographer and filmmaker Alison Jackson portrayed Blair and Campbell rehearsing Blair's reaction to Diana's death in her 2007 film Blaired Vision. The pair, portrayed by actors, invent the term "paparazzi princess" and "the new people's princess of a new Britain". The film historian and critic Richard Wallace in his 2018 book Mockumentary Comedy: Performing Authenticity felt that Jackson was "ask[ing] us to question whether anything done in the name of New Labour can be taken at face value".

In November 2013 a plaque was placed on the spot where Blair gave his statement at the church in Trimdon.
