= London City Ballet =

British ballet company

London City Ballet is a British ballet company. Originally founded in 1978, Diana, Princess of Wales was its patron from 1983 to 1996. The company closed due to financial problems in 1996. It was subsequently re-founded in 2024 by British choreographer Christopher Marney.

The company featured heavily in The Optimist, a television comedy series, in the 1985 episode 'The Light Fantastic'.
