= Kew Palace =

British royal palace within Kew Gardens

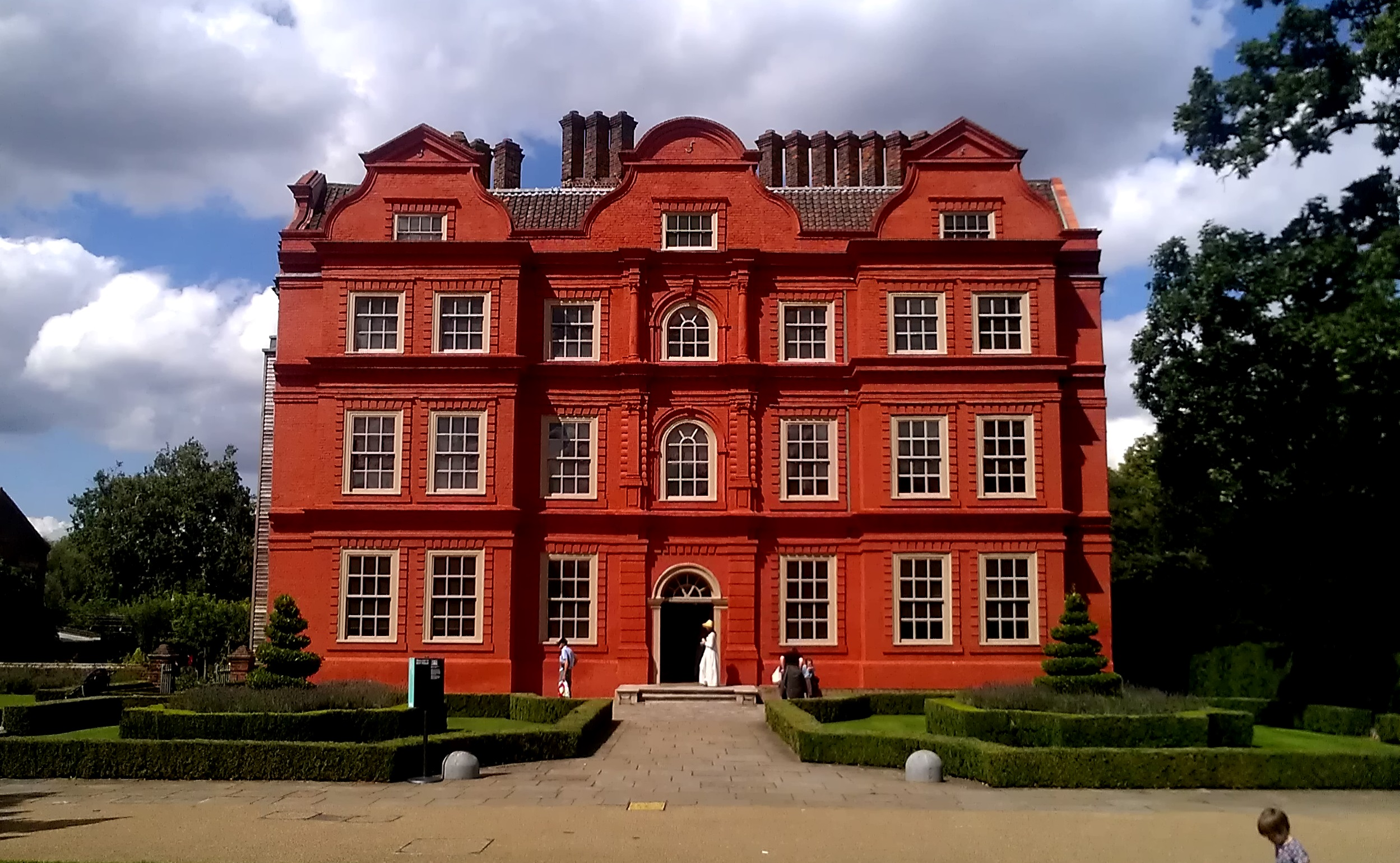
- The Dutch House, one of the few surviving parts of the Kew Palace complex

- Location within London Borough of Richmond upon Thames
- 51°29′02″N 00°17′42″W
- Type: Palace
- Location: Kew Gardens
- OS grid reference: TQ 18482 77474

History
- Built: 1631

Site notes
- Area: London Borough of Richmond upon Thames
- Architectural style: Artisan Mannerist
- Governing body: Historic Royal Palaces

Listed Building – Grade I
- Official name: Kew Palace
- Designated: 10 January 1950
- Reference no.: 1263073

Kew Palace is a British royal palace within the grounds of Kew Gardens on the banks of the River Thames. Originally a large complex, few elements of it survive. Dating to 1631 but built atop the undercroft of an earlier building, the main survivor is known as the Dutch House. Its royal occupation lasted from around 1728 until 1818, with a final short-lived occupation in 1844. The Dutch House is Grade I listed, and open to visitors. It is cared for by an independent charity, Historic Royal Palaces, which receives no funding from the government or the Crown. Alongside the Dutch House is a part of its 18th-century service wing, whilst nearby are a former housekeeper's cottage, brewhouse and kitchen block – most of these buildings are private, though the kitchens are open to the public. These kitchens, the Great Pagoda and Queen Charlotte's Cottage are also run by Historic Royal Palaces.

== History ==
=== Fortreys and Capels ===
Beneath the Dutch House is the undercroft of a 16th-century building. This was on land owned by John Dudley and restored to his son Robert Dudley, 1st Earl of Leicester, childhood friend and court favourite of Elizabeth I, in 1558. It belonged to a west-facing brick building and may be identifiable with a house in Kew in which Robert Dudley entertained Elizabeth in 1563 – one of Elizabeth's main palaces at that time was the nearby Richmond Palace.

In 1619, the building above the undercroft was leased by Samuel Fortrey, who finally demolished all but the undercroft in 1631, erecting a new larger south-facing manor house in its place. The father of the author Samuel Fortrey, Samuel Fortrey senior was a merchant descended from a family originating near Lille, though later confusion over his ancestry led to the building becoming known as the Dutch House. That name also originated in the house's supposedly Dutch style of architecture, known as Artisan Mannerist and dominated by Dutch gables – this style was actually more prevalent in London, East Anglia and East Kent than the Netherlands at the time. In 1697, Fortrey's descendants leased the building to Sir Richard Levett, a powerful merchant and the former Lord Mayor of London, who later left it to his daughter Mary.

=== Kew House ===
Facing the 1631 house was another mansion, possibly of Tudor origin. It was often visited by the diarist John Evelyn and passed from Richard Bennett to his daughter Dorothy, wife of Henry Capel. Dorothy and Henry remained childless and so the house then passed to Dorothy's great-niece Elizabeth, wife of the Prince of Wales's secretary, Samuel Molyneux, and then to Molyneux's physician Nathaniel St André. This mansion, which was eventually pulled down in 1802, was also the site of James Bradley's observations in 1725 that led to his discovery of the aberration of light. William IV marked the site of the observations with a Thomas Tompion sundial in 1832, transferred from Hampton Court Palace to a plinth to the Dutch House's south-east. This was replaced with a replica in 1959 and moved to its new and different site directly to the south of the Dutch House.

=== George II's children ===
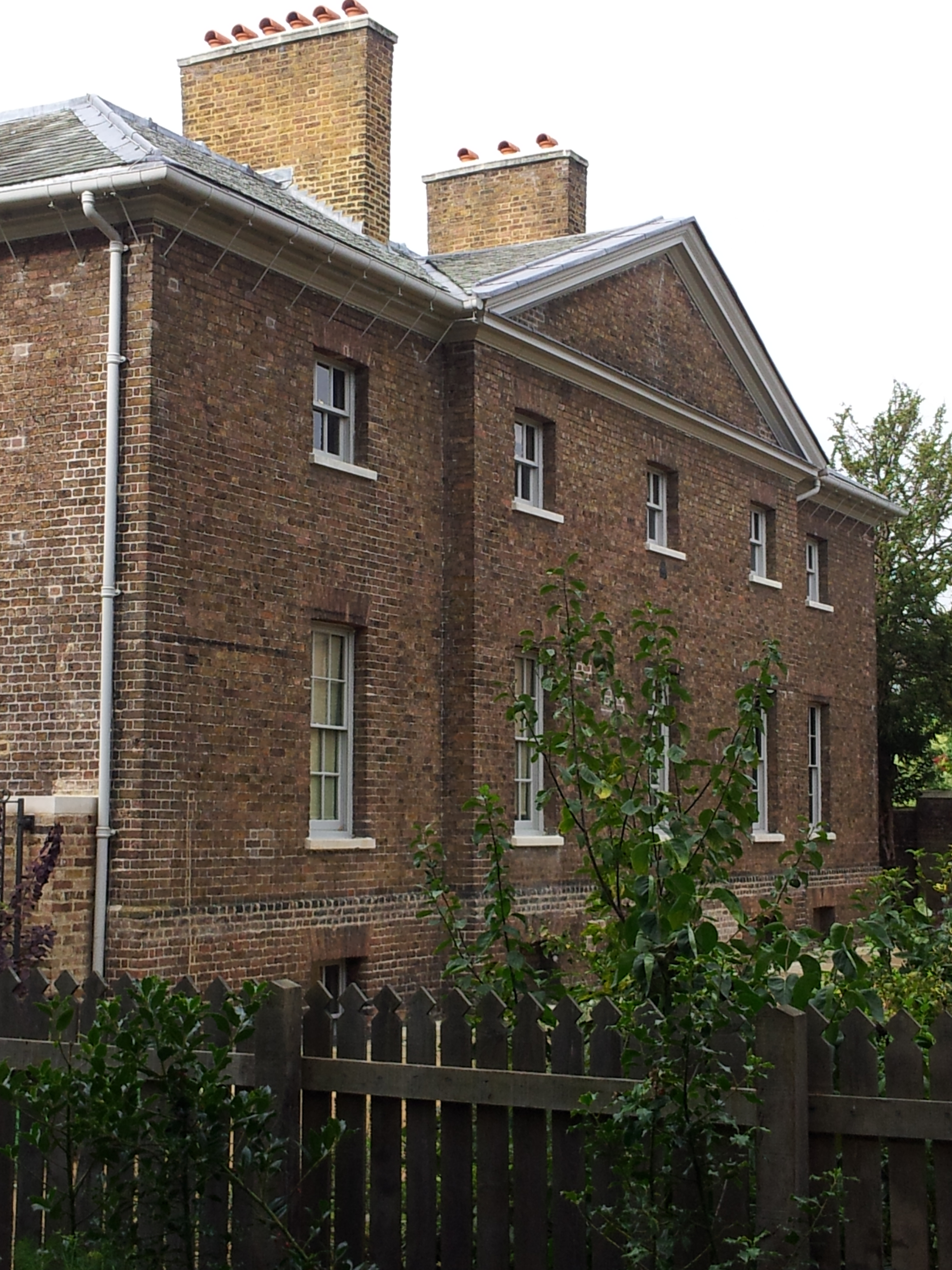
Frederick's new kitchens at Kew

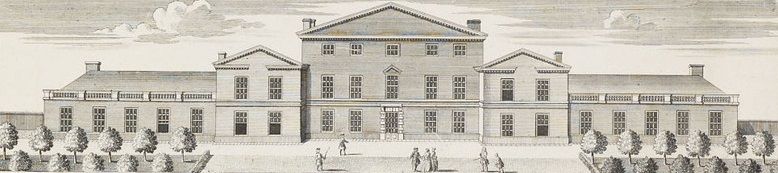
The south front of the White House after Frederick's remodelling, from John Rocque's map of Richmond Gardens, 1734

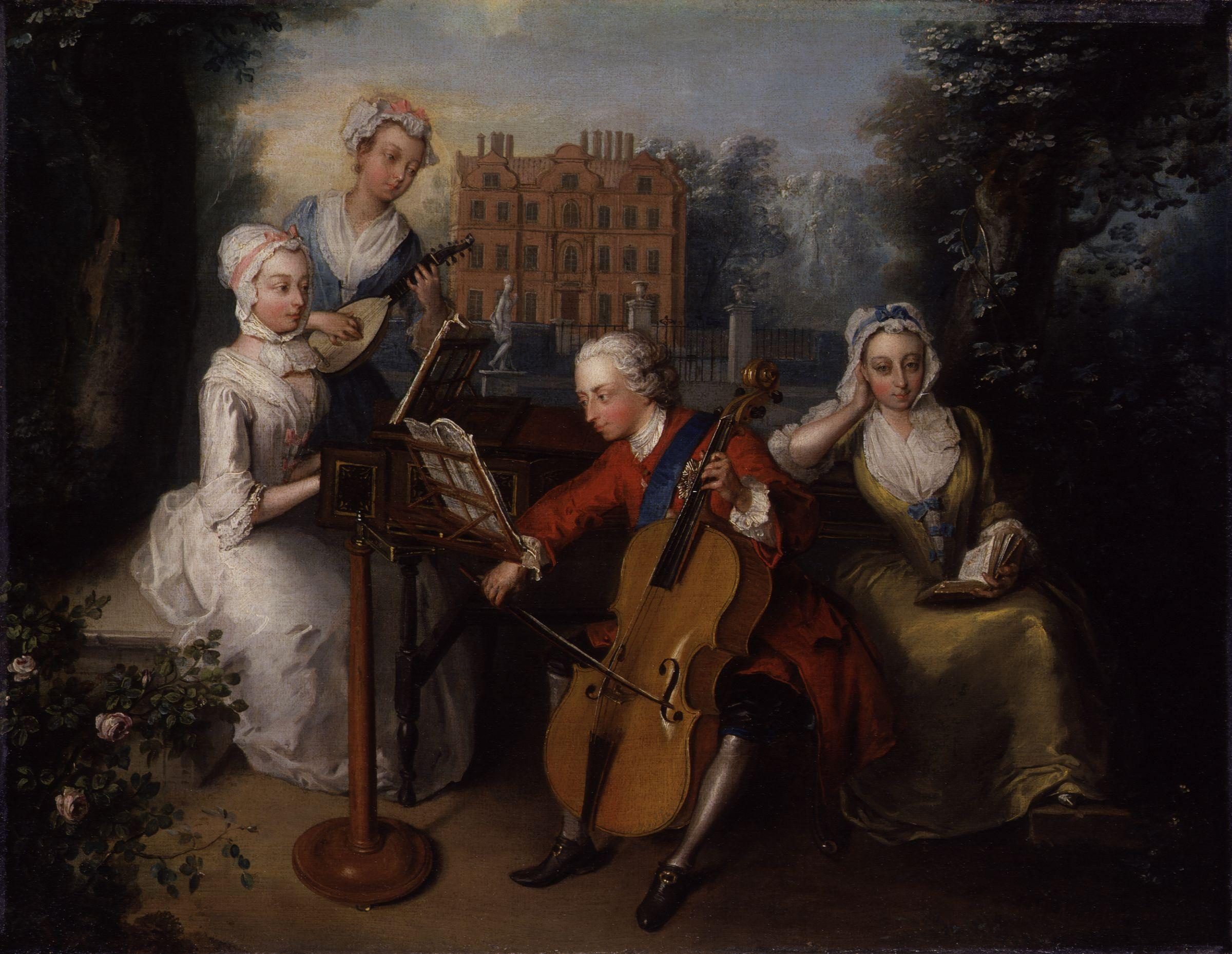
The Music Party by Philippe Mercier. The National Portrait Gallery version of the musical portrait

In 1727, Queen Caroline and George II came to the British throne. By that time they had six children living with them at their summer residence at Richmond Lodge. In 1728 Caroline leased the Dutch House to house her three eldest daughters Anne, Amelia and Caroline and another nearby building which became known as the 'Queen's House', though the intended occupant may have been her son William rather than the queen herself. This left Caroline's two youngest daughters Mary and Louise with her at Richmond Lodge.

George and Caroline had come to Britain in 1714 when George's father took the throne as George I, leaving their eldest son Frederick behind in Hanover aged 7. When George II succeeded his father, Frederick became Prince of Wales and so was finally allowed to come to Britain. He arrived in December 1728, less than a year after his mother had taken the lease on the Dutch House. Now aged 21, knowing little of his sisters and possibly wishing for a family rapprochement, he soon took a long lease on the old Capel House at Kew and in 1731 also purchased its contents from St André. Frederick then set about remodeling it with assistance from William Kent – it then became known as the White House due to its plastered exterior. Frederick also added a large new separate kitchen block, open to the public since 2012 as 'the Royal Kitchens'. There was also a stable block of an unknown date serving the White House, located a short distance to its north-east and demolished in the late 19th century.

An oil-on-canvas musical portrait from 1733 shows Frederick and his three eldest sisters playing mandolin, harpsichord and cello. It was painted by his librarian and art agent Philip Mercier and exists in three variants, two of which show the Dutch House in the background (National Portrait Gallery and National Trust) – the third variant in the Royal Collection shows the same group in an interior, possibly Kensington Palace. Anne married and left England the year after the portrait was painted and Caroline left Kew in 1743, retiring to St James's Palace, where she died in 1757.

Along with Cliveden, the White House became Frederick's main family country home, where he entertained poets such as James Thomson (author of The Seasons) and Alexander Pope (who had moved into the area in 1719 and built his eponymous villa at Twickenham). In 1738 Pope gave Prince Frederick a dog, with the following verse inscribed on its collar:

I am His Highness' dog at Kew.
Pray tell me, sir, whose dog are you?

=== Augusta and George III ===
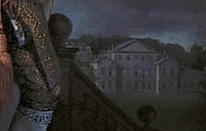
The White House in the background of The Family of Frederick, Prince of Wales, a 1751 group portrait of Frederick's widow and children by George Knapton.

Frederick began remodelling the gardens associated with the White House, but "after staying all day in the garden till night, in the damp rain and hail to look at his workmen" in 1751 he caught a chill which – combined with a pulmonary embolism – proved fatal. His widow Augusta continued living at the White House with their children and remodelling the gardens. She was advised by her husband's friend John Stuart, 3rd Earl of Bute, and assisted by Sir William Chambers, one of the greatest masters of ornamental English gardening.

Frederick's sister Amelia was probably still in the Dutch House throughout the 1730s and 1740s, but seems to have moved out in 1751 when she was made ranger of Richmond Park, which came with a residence at White Lodge. This meant the Dutch House could become a schoolhouse for Augusta's two eldest sons, George (the future George III) and Edward, where they were taught by Bute and Chambers. In 1760 George took the throne, and a year later he married Charlotte of Mecklenburg-Strelitz, moving into Richmond Lodge as his summer residence as his family grew – he and Charlotte had fifteen children between 1762 and 1783.

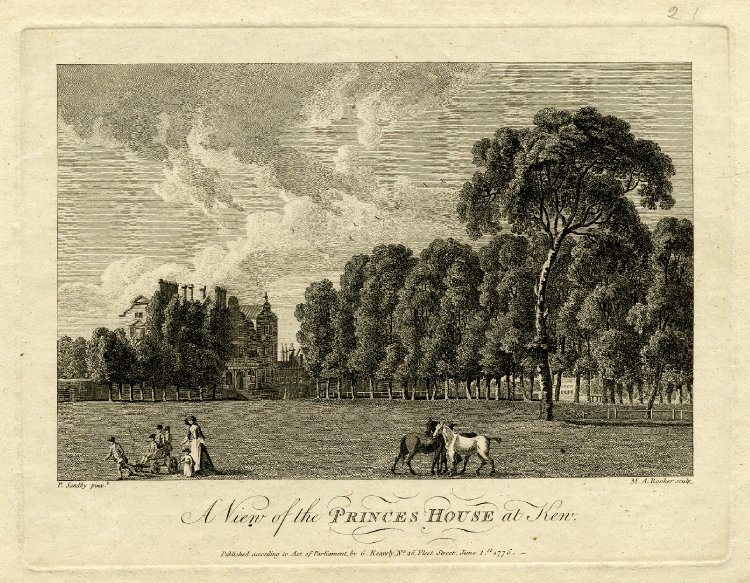
An engraving after a 1771–72 watercolour by Paul Sandby, showing a view of the Dutch House from the riverside and Lady Charlotte Finch with some of the royal children

Chambers built the Orangery and Great Pagoda at Kew for Augusta in 1761–62 but later in that decade she mainly lived at Carlton House. However, Augusta nominally retained the Dutch House and White House until her death in 1772, when they passed to George, who demolished Richmond Lodge and switched his summer residence to the White House. He also used the latter building to house some of his art collection, including a number of Canaletto's works and The Tribuna of the Uffizi by Zoffany, who lived nearby and is buried at St Anne's Church.

George continued the Dutch House's use as a schoolhouse, now for his two eldest sons George and Frederick. This led to it being known as 'the Prince of Wales's House' or 'the House Late the Prince of Wales's', though the future George IV never lived in it after his childhood. Small households of royal children were lodged in houses on Kew Green and the royal governess Lady Charlotte Finch also lived locally – in a watercolour of c. 1771–72 she is shown in the grounds of the Dutch House with some of the children.

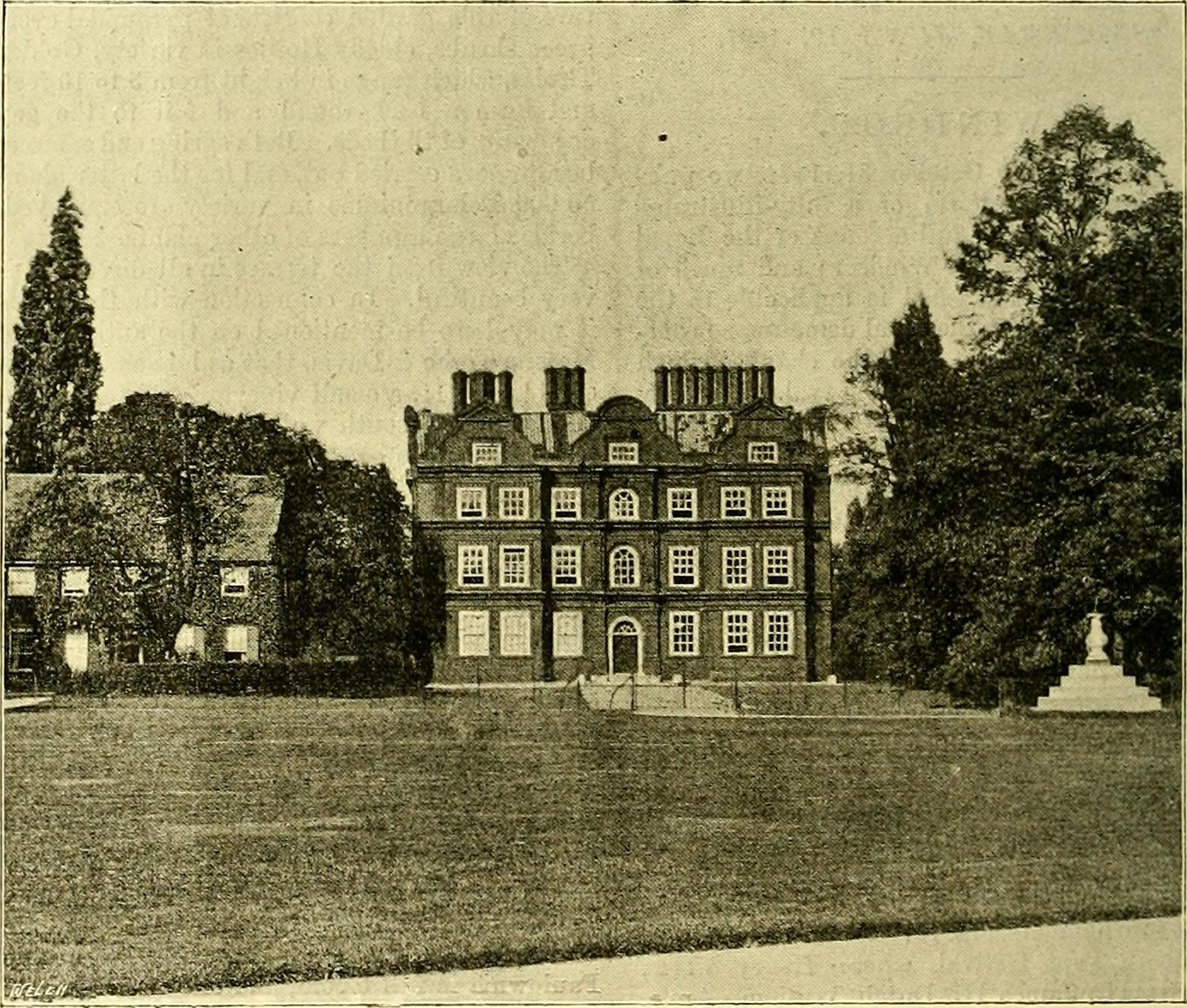
An 1897 photograph of the palace showing (left) the remnants of the service wing in which George III was housed in 1804 and (right) the original site of the Tompion sundial

A map of 1771 delineated the land between the Dutch House and the river as still belonging to barrister Levett Blackborne, Lincoln's Inn barrister and grandson of Sir Richard Levett. This reflects the fact that the buildings and grounds were only leased by the royal family right up until 13 October 1781, when George III purchased the freehold from the Levetts for £20,000. Seven years later, George was kept in the White House during his first bout of 'madness' from November 1788 to March 1789, with his wife Charlotte and their daughters living on the upper floors and the Grooms of the Bedchamber in the Dutch House. The White House was then allowed to fall into disrepair, though it still proved possible to house him there during the second bout in 1801, whilst Charlotte and her daughters moved into the Dutch House to await news of George's recovery. The White House was finally demolished in 1802 and so on the onset of the third bout of 'madness' in 1804 George was housed in an upgraded single-storey service wing of the Dutch House and possibly also on the ground floor of the Dutch House, with Charlotte and the princesses on the Dutch House's first and second floors. (That service wing was mainly demolished in 1881 but originally connected directly onto the west side of the Dutch House.)

=== Disuse and decline ===
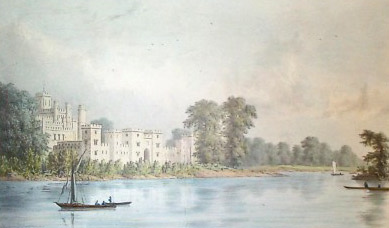
A drawing of New Kew Palace, by William Westall, 1823

Another reason for the demolition of the White House and the decreasing use of the Dutch House was the Castellated Palace, whose planning and design began around 1800. George's chosen architect was James Wyatt, whom he had taken on for works at Windsor Castle at around the same time. The building also became known as the New Palace or New Kew Palace and so the Dutch House was often known as the Old Palace or the Old Red House between 1800 and 1828.

George created a site for the Castellated Palace by demolishing the old Queen's House and construction began around 1802. Known by some historians as "a late Georgian Nonsuch", it was in the neo-Gothic style. George was a late convert to this style – he wrote to his daughter Charlotte in 1803 stating:

I never thought I should have adopted Gothic instead of Grecian architecture, but the bad taste of the last forty years has so entirely corrupted the professors of the latter I have taken to the former from thinking Wyatt perfect in that style, of which my house will I trust be a good example.

He had possibly been influenced by nearby Strawberry Hill House, by his earlier work on Windsor Castle and by his visits to Hartlebury Castle and Worcester Cathedral in 1788 and to Lulworth Castle and Sherborne Castle in 1789. Though Wyatt led the design, contributions were probably made by the king himself, who had been trained in architectural drawing as a boy at Kew by William Chambers. This royal involvement and interference may have contributed to repeated delays and overspend in construction thanks to his 1801 and 1804 illnesses. The new palace was widely criticised – in his 1817 "A Morning's Walk from London to Kew", Sir Richard Phillips nicknamed it "the Bastile palace, from its resemblance to that building, so obnoxious to freedom and freemen." He continued:

On a former occasion I have viewed its interior, and I am at a loss to conceive the motive for preferring an external form, which rendered it impracticable to construct within it more than a series of large closets, boudoirs, and rooms like oratories.

John Bew also included the Castellated Palace in his tourists' guide of 1820:

[T]his Anglo-Teutonic, castellated, gothized structure, (which has never been completed, and probably never will be) must be considered as an abortive production, at once illustrative of bad taste and defective judgment. From the small size of the windows and the diminutive proportion of its turrets, it would seem to possess "Windows that exclude the light,/ And passages that lead to nothing." The northern front was intended to be appropriated to the use of domestics; the whole building is rendered nearly indestructible by fire, by means of cast-iron joists and rafters, &c. The principal part is brick, stuccoed to resemble stone.

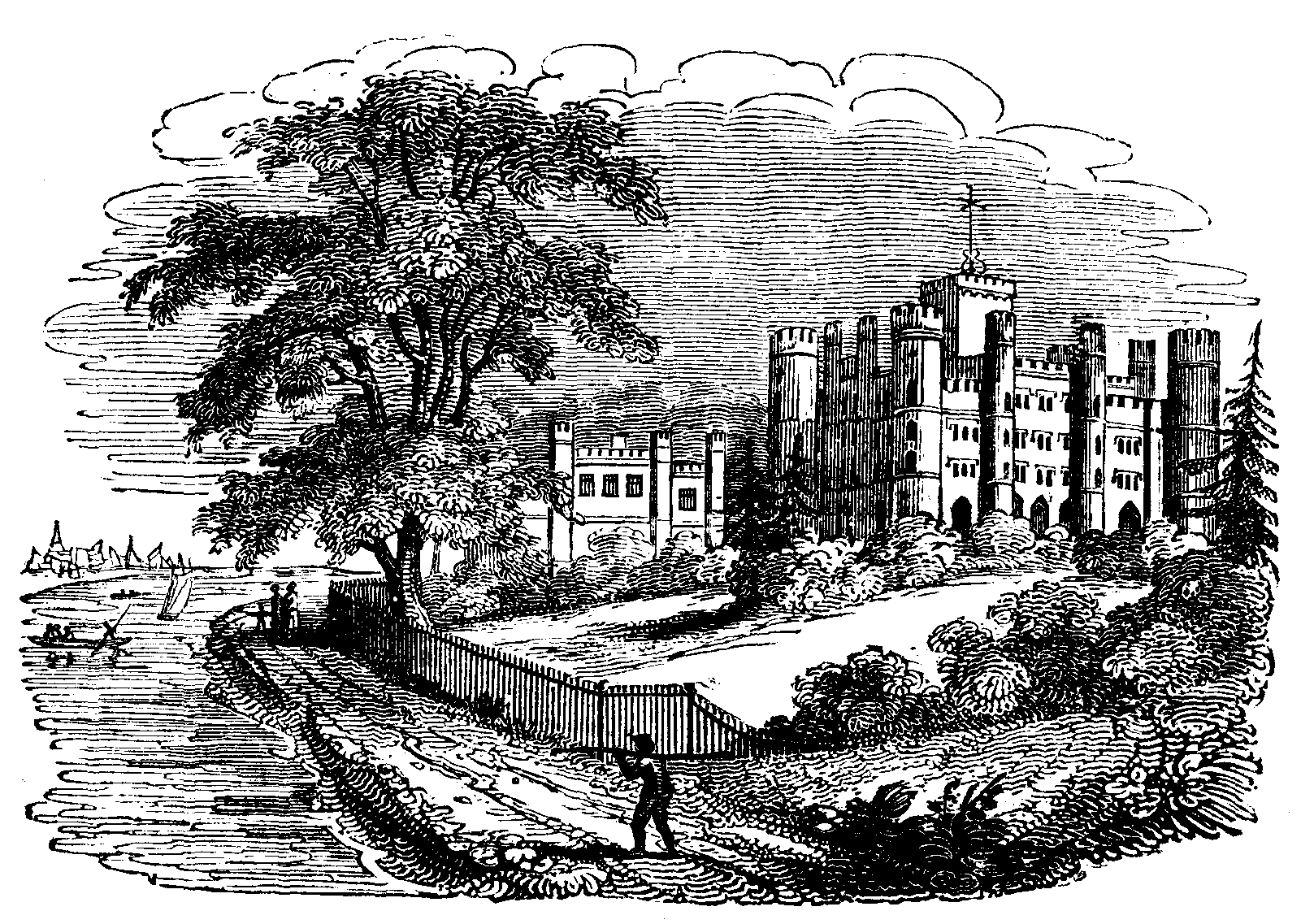
The Castellated Palace (1827 woodcut)

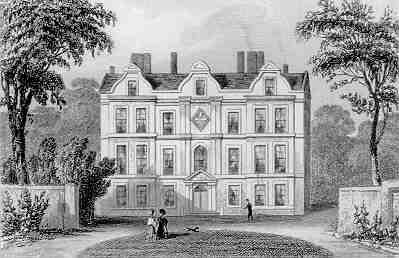
The Dutch House in 1835, showing Queen Charlotte's funeral hatchment hanging from its façade; this is now on show in the building.

The king stopped off at the Dutch House in August 1805 to meet with his daughter-in-law Caroline and his granddaughter Charlotte. His family moved back into the Dutch House in October that year until renovation work at the princesses' rooms in Windsor was complete. George made a final visit to Kew in 1806 to view works on the Castellated Palace and never returned, though the Dutch House was refitted in 1809 for his youngest daughter Princess Amelia, who had expressed a wish to move into it to convalesce from her tuberculosis. However, her parents vetoed this and she remained at Windsor, where her death in 1810 probably triggered the king's final bout of 'madness'.

This fourth and final bout of 'madness' also meant that work on the Castellated Palace ceased for good, leaving only a mostly roofed shell. This bout lasted ten years, all of which time he was confined at Windsor rather than Kew. In 1818, Queen Charlotte set out from London to Windsor to see the king and to attend the double wedding of her sons William and Edward. En route she decided to spend a few days at the Dutch House, but since she was ill with dropsy she was unable to continue her journey and so the weddings took place in the drawing room there on 11 July 1818. Later that year, on 17 November, Charlotte died in her bedroom on the first floor of the building.

George died at Windsor in 1820 and his eldest son and successor George IV decided to demolish the Castellated Palace. After studying the project's accounts (its total costs had risen to £500,000 by 1811 (equivalent to £34.9 million in 2025 pounds), as opposed to the initial allocation of £40,000 in 1800 (equivalent to £2.9 million in 2025 pounds)), Parliament approved that decision and ordered that the few fixtures and fittings which had already installed in the Castellated Palace be removed and sent to other royal residences – its staircase was later used at Buckingham Palace. The year before the demolition, an article stated:

Innumerable are the instances of princes having sought to perpetuate their memories by the building of palaces, from the Domus Aurea, or golden house of Nero, to the comparatively puny structures of our own times. As specimens of modern magnificence and substantial comfort, the latter class of edifices may be admirable; but we are bound to acknowledge, that in boldness and splendour of design, they cannot assimilate to the labours of antiquity, much of whose stupendous character is to this day preserved in many series of interesting ruins:—

Whilst in the progress of the long decay,
Thrones sink to dust, and nations pass away.

As a record of this degeneracy, near the western corner of Kew Green stands the [Castellated Palace] ... [its] north front possesses an air of solemn, sullen grandeur; but it very ill accords with the taste and science generally displayed by its nominal architect [George III].

... [Its foundations are] in a bog close to the Thames, and the principal object in its view is the dirty town of Brentford, on the opposite side of the river; a selection, it would seem, of family taste, for [George III's grandfather] George II is known to have often said, when riding through Brentford, "I do like this place, it's so like Yarmany [ie Germany]."

The premature fate of [the new] Kew Palace renders it at this moment an object of public curiosity

=== Opened to the public ===
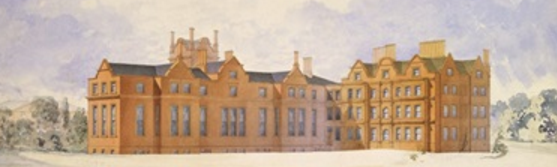
Proposals for an extension to Kew Palace by Jeffry Wyatville for William IV, 1829

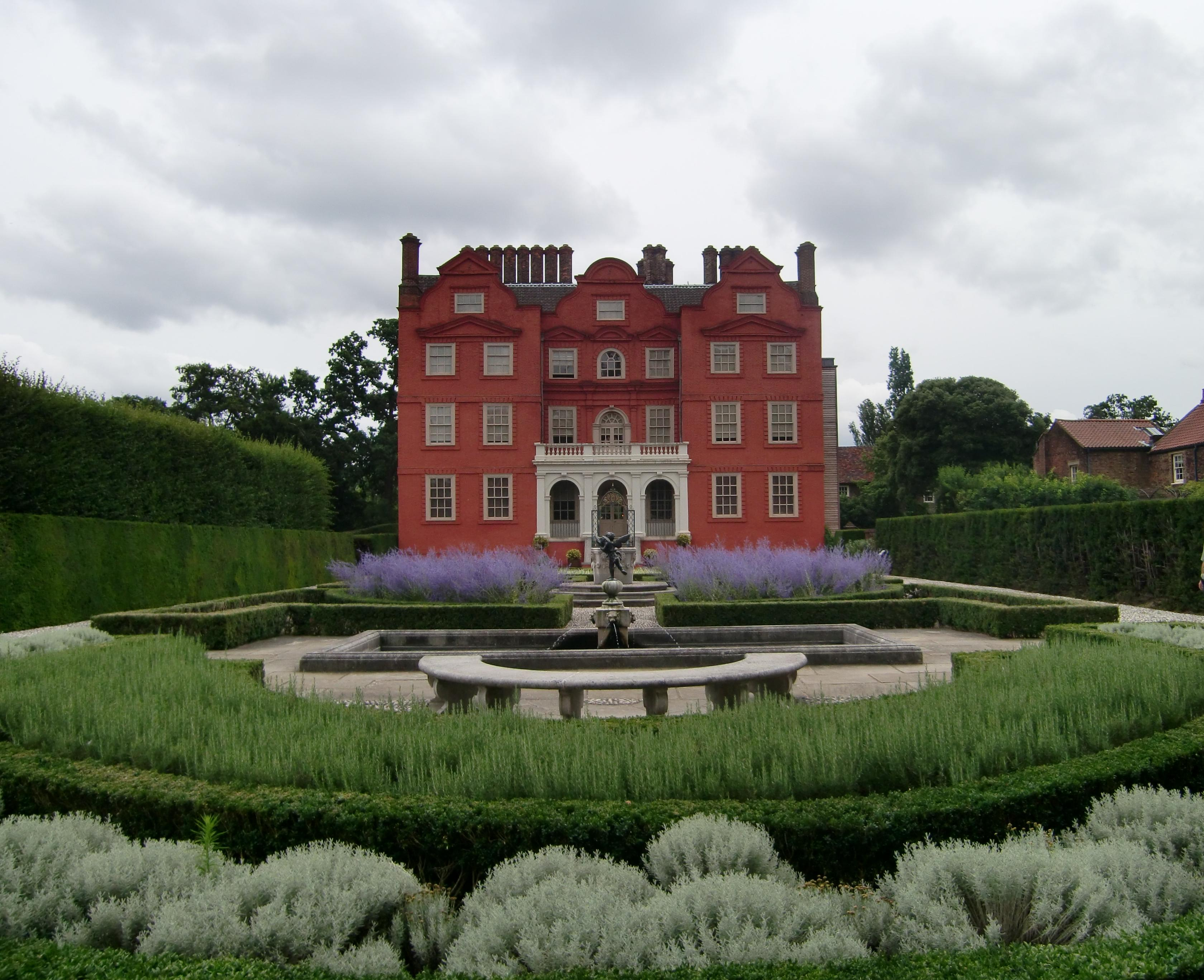
Rear view of Kew Palace from its gardens

George IV also planned to demolish the Dutch House, but this did not come to fruition. Possibly influenced by having been married there in 1818, his brother William IV commissioned plans for adding a west wing to it and bringing it back into use, but this too did not come about. William did offer the Dutch House to his sister-in-law Victoria, Duchess of Kent for her and her daughter (the future Queen Victoria), but she turned it down as "an old house quite unfit for the princess and me to occupy, being very inadequate in accommodation and almost destitute of furniture". Queen Victoria briefly sent three of her own children there in summer 1844, but the following year she and Prince Albert began remodelling Osborne House on the Isle of Wight as their summer residence. The Dutch House thus remained unoccupied until 1898, when she transferred it and Queen Charlotte's Cottage to Kew Gardens to mark her Diamond Jubilee. By this time the palace's stables and most of the Dutch House's service wing had been demolished, probably in 1881. A replica 17th-century Dutch garden was added to the house's rear in 1969.

The Dutch House remained open to the public until 1996, when a major restoration project commenced. This not only included physical restoration to the building, but also weaving of period draperies and other fabric décor carried out by master weaver Ian Dale of Scotland. An external lift shaft was added on the west wing for disabled access, in the place of a privy shaft which had been demolished in the 1880s. The building was used to hold a dinner hosted by Charles, Prince of Wales to celebrate the 80th birthday of Queen Elizabeth II on 21 April 2006 – a few days later it reopened as a visitor attraction. The Palace was featured in the 2006 BBC TV documentary series Tales from the Palaces. It is run by Historic Royal Palaces, which has also taken on responsibility for the Royal Kitchens (reopening them to the public in 2012) and the Pagoda (re-opened to the public in 2018).

== See also ==
- Kew Letters

== Sources ==
- Desmond, Ray (1995). Kew: The History of the Royal Botanic Gardens. London: Harvill. ISBN 978-1-86046-076-0.
- Groom, Susanne; Prosser, Lee (2006). Kew Palace: The Official Illustrated History. Merrell Publishers Ltd. ISBN 978-1-85894-323-7.
