= Helton Cottage =

Historic house in Greensboro, Alabama

The Helton Cottage
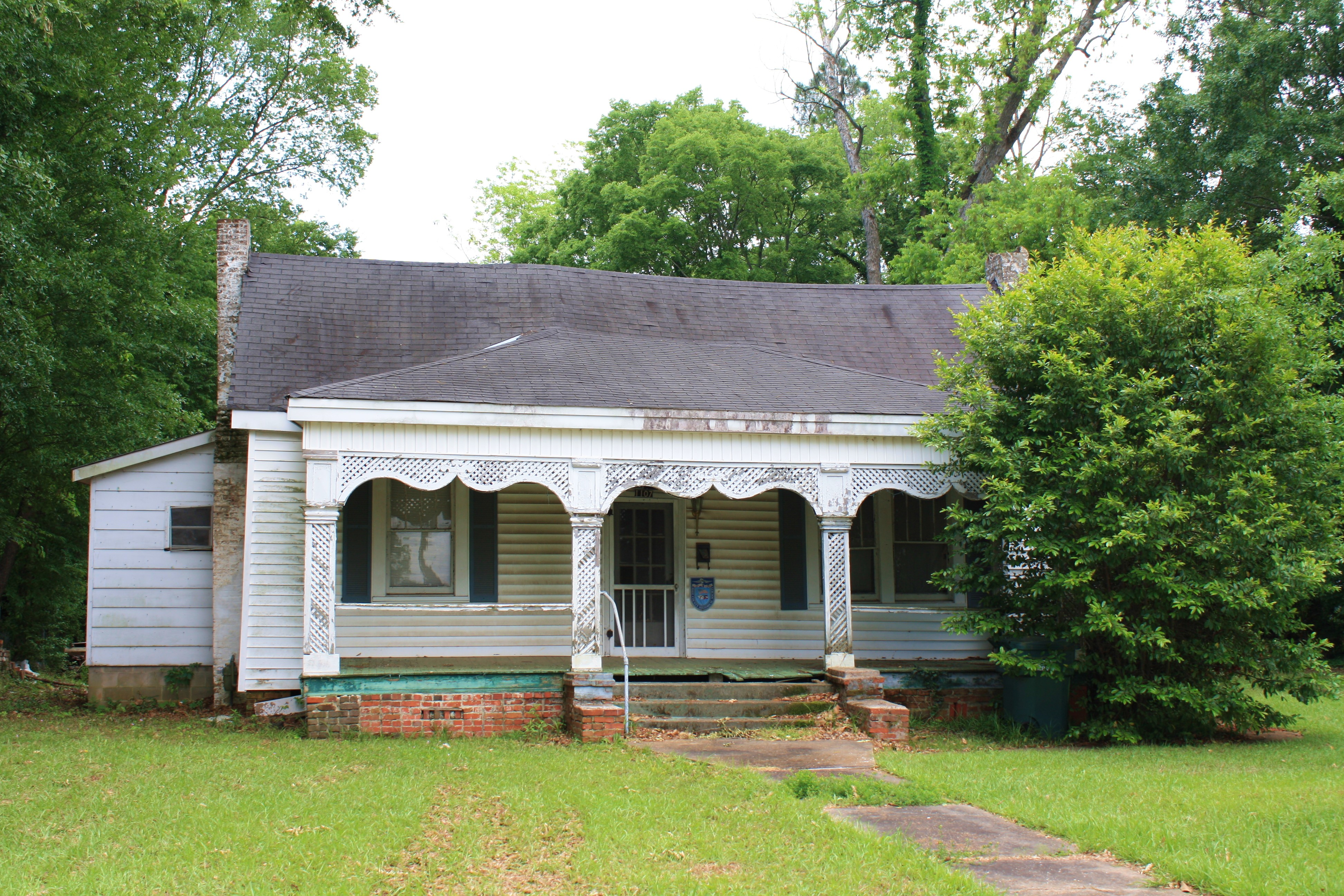
- Coordinates: 32°42′10.1″N 87°35′37.0″W

The Helton Cottage is an early 19th century dwelling located in Greensboro, Alabama. The house is one story with a modified pitched roof and circa 1840s lattice porch. The house began as a single room, possibly an outbuilding of the nearby Johnston-Torbet House. The house was on a parcel belonging to Thomas Johnston in the 1830s. The property was subdivided and given to his daughter Caroline and her husband Dr. William Jones. The Jones's children sold the house to Caleb Jones, a British immigrant who ran a jewelry store and was an amateur astronomer. In 1905, the house was purchased by Mr. and Mrs. John Helton. Their tenure in the house led the community to call the house by its current name.

The house is a rare surviving example of the Cottage orné architecture style seen in rural or semi rural settings. The one level porch features lavish lattice work and raised panels, along with chamfered panels and pierced wooded porch supports.
