= Queen Charlotte's Cottage =

Cottage orné in Kew Gardens, London

Coordinates: 51°28′23″N 0°18′13″W

Queen Charlotte's Cottage is an 18th-century cottage orné within the grounds of Kew Gardens on the banks of the River Thames in London. It is named after Queen Charlotte, who was responsible for its construction. Dating from 1772, the cottage is Grade II* listed. The cottage is maintained by Historic Royal Palaces, and is open to visitors.

== Queen Charlotte at Kew ==
George III's widowed mother, Princess Augusta, lived much of the time at Kew. George III, like his father Prince Frederick before him, had agricultural interests. These two factors led George III and Queen Charlotte to spending summers at Kew, in Richmond Lodge and what is now called Kew Palace. It was from these origins that Queen Charlotte determined to erect the cottage that now bears her name.

== Design ==
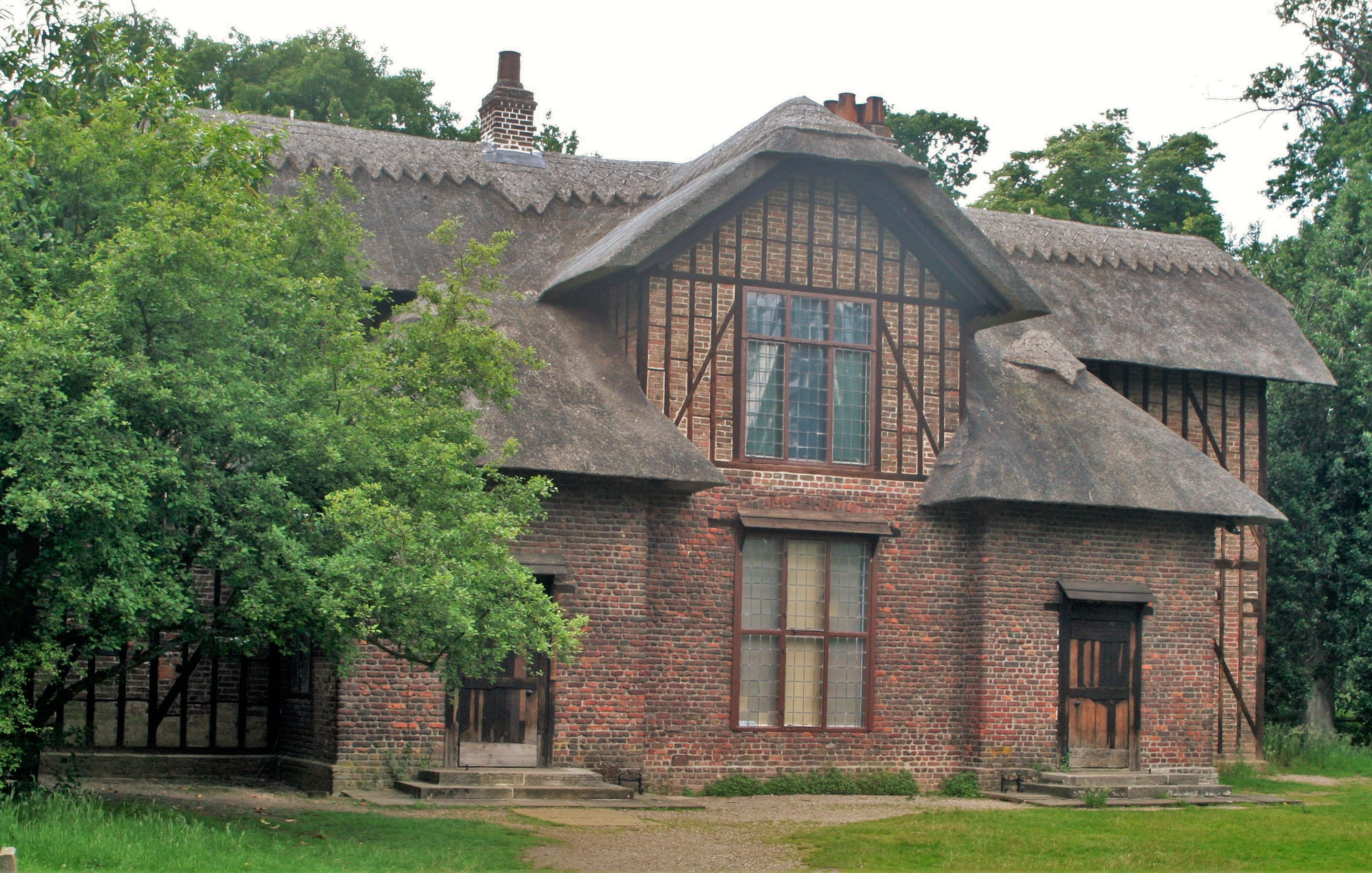
Queen Charlotte's Cottage

The cottage orné dates to a movement of rustic stylised cottages of the late 18th and early 19th-centuries: such a cottage must be in a deliberately rustic style, and typically it features a well-shaped thatch roof with ornate timberwork. A single storey is also typical, although a second storey is not unknown.

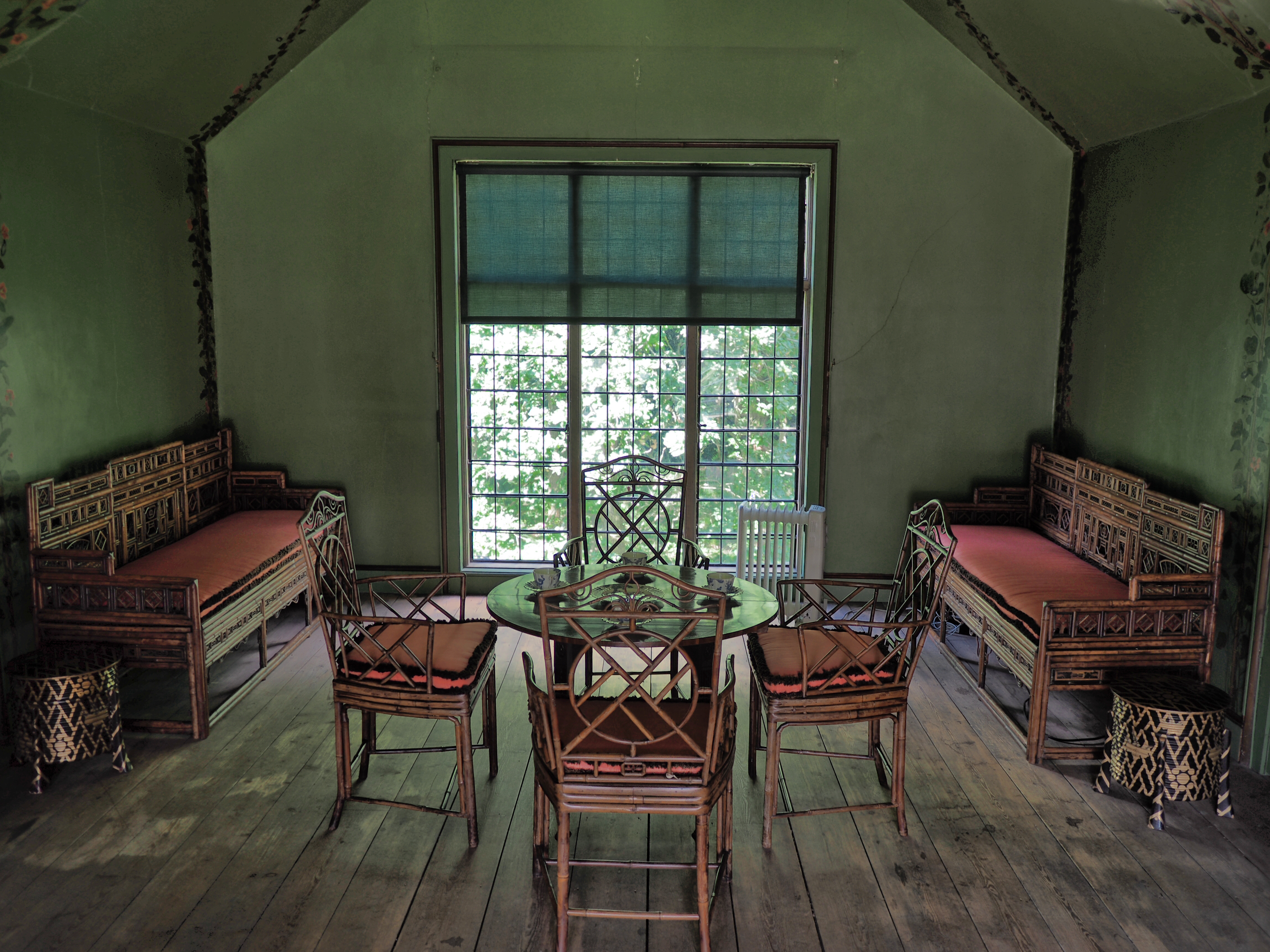
The Picnic Room, with Princess Elizabeth's painting

Queen Charlotte's Cottage dates from 1772, and is one of the earliest examples of a cottage orné. The design is timber-framed with brick infill, which has been attributed to the North German vernacular which the Queen will have recalled from her childhood. The roof is thatched, and the simple doors are made of rough planks with wooden latches. The windows, which are large for a cottage, are recycled 17th-century frames with leaded panes. Inside, the cottage is more elaborate than is usual for a cottage orné. There are two main rooms: the Print Room downstairs and the Picnic Room above it, linked by a cantilevered staircase. The Picnic Room was painted by Princess Elizabeth (who had been taught botanical drawing by Franz Bauer) in the early 19th-century to represent the interior of a bower.

The earliest description of the cottage is from 1774, in which the design is attributed to Charlotte herself. As the Queen paid for the work herself, the records were in her Privy Purse papers, which have not been traced. There is some evidence that Sir William Chambers (who designed the nearby Great Pagoda for Princess Augusta in 1762 and a number of other features at Kew) turned the Queen's ideas into architect's plans. Queen Charlotte's Cottage was extended in 1805 with a half-timbered second storey and a thatched roof.

The thatching is Norfolk reed, which is the original material, with a sedge, patterned ridge. The cottage is fitted with a sprinkler system, and the sprinklers poke through the thatch in places. The most recent thatching was undertaken by Bardsley & Brown Ltd.

== The grounds ==
From 1792 Queen Charlotte kept kangaroos in the rear paddock, until 1806 when it was turned into a flower garden by W. T. Aiton.

== Opening to the public ==
Queen Victoria rarely visited the cottage, but it was maintained by a housekeeper throughout her reign. The writer Sir Arthur Helps lived in the cottage on a grace and favour basis from 1867 until his death in 1875. In 1898 she gave both the cottage and Kew Palace to the public to commemorate her diamond jubilee the previous year. The gift of the cottage was conditional upon the grounds being left in an uncultivated state. Both the cottage and Kew Palace, as well as the Pagoda, are now maintained by Historic Royal Palaces and are open to visitors.

In October 2021, the building was one of 142 sites across England to receive part of a £35-million injection into the government's Culture Recovery Fund.
