= Eleri Lynn =

Eleri Lynn (born 1977) is a curator and historian. Her published works have focussed on material culture, fabrics, and fashion at the Tudor and Stuart court.

== Career ==
A fluent Welsh speaker, Eleri Lynn worked as a curator at the Victoria and Albert Museum and Amgueddfa Cymru – Museum Wales. She gained a PhD from Kingston University on the use of textiles and dress in the projection of magnificence at the Tudor court. Lynn was appointed Chief Curator at Historic Royal Palaces in February 2025.

Eleri Lynn is a trustee of the Royal School of Needlework.

== Publications ==
- "Canopied with Flowers: Adorning Court Spaces with Floral Tapestries and Hangings", in Susannah Lyon-Whaley (ed.) Floral Culture in the Tudor and Stuart Courts (Amsterdam University Press, 2024). doi:10.1017/9789048557356.003
- Tudor Textiles (Yale University Press, 2020).
- "The Bacton Altar Cloth: Elizabeth I's 'long-lost skirt'?", Costume 52:1 (March 2018), pp. 3–25. doi:10.3366/cost.2018.0045
- Tudor Fashion (Yale University Press, 2017).
- Underwear: Fashion in Detail (London: V&A, 2010).

== Exhibitions ==
- The Lost Dress of Elizabeth I, Hampton Court, 2019–2020.
- Diana: Her Fashion Story, Kensington Palace, 2017–2019.
