= Susanne Groom =

British historian and author

Susanne Jean Groom (13 October 1945 – 13 July 2023) was a British historian, an author and a former curator at Historic Royal Palaces. She lived in Kew in the London Borough of Richmond upon Thames.

== Publications ==
- The Story of the Gardens at Hampton Court Palace, Historic Royal Palaces, 2016 ISBN 9781873993378
- At the King's Table: Royal Dining Through the Ages (with a foreword by Heston Blumenthal), Merrell Publishers Ltd in association with Historic Royal Palaces, 2013 ISBN 9781858946139
- (with David Souden, Jane Spooner and Sally Dixon-Smith) Discover the Banqueting House, Historic Royal Palaces, 2011 ISBN 978-1873993187
- Discover the Gardens: Official Guidebook (Hampton Court Palace), Historic Royal Palaces, 2008 ISBN 9781873993088
- (with Brett Dolman, Richard Fitch and Mard Meltonville) The Taste of the Fire: The Story of the Tudor Kitchens at Hampton Court Palace, Historic Royal Palaces, 2007 ISBN 978-1873993033
- (with Lee Prosser) Kew Palace: The Official Illustrated History, Merrell Publishers Ltd, 2006 ISBN 9781858943237
- (with Simon Thurley and Susan Jenkins) The Banqueting House, Historic Royal Palaces, 1997 ISBN 978-6000364236
- (with Simon Thurley) Kew Palace, Official Guidebook, Historic Royal Palaces, 1995.
