= Historic Royal Palaces =

Charity that manages some UK royal palaces

- Abbreviation: HRP
- Formation: 1989
- Legal status: Royal Charter Body
- Headquarters: Hampton Court Palace
- Location: United Kingdom
- Region served: England and Northern Ireland
- Members: 160,622 (2025)
- Chair: Nicholas Coleridge
- Chief Executive Officer: John Barnes
- Main organ: Board of Trustees
- Revenue: £138.6 million (2025)
- Staff: 910 FTE (2025)
- Website: www.hrp.org.uk

Historic Royal Palaces is an independent charity that manages the United Kingdom's unoccupied royal palaces:

- The Tower of London
- Hampton Court Palace
- The State Apartments and Orangery at Kensington Palace
- The Banqueting House, Whitehall
- Kew Palace with Queen Charlotte's Cottage and Great Pagoda at Kew Gardens

Historic Royal Palaces is also responsible for Hillsborough Castle in the north-west of County Down, the King’s official residence in Northern Ireland.

Historic Royal Palaces has managed the London palaces since 1989, and Hillsborough Castle since 2014. Occupied royal palaces, such as Buckingham Palace and Windsor Castle, are maintained by the Royal Household Property Section, and some are open to the public.

== Constitution ==
Historic Royal Palaces is established as a Royal Charter Body with charitable status.

The objectives of Historic Royal Palaces, as set out in its Royal Charter are, for the benefit of the nation:

- to manage, conserve, renovate, repair, maintain and improve the Palaces to a high standard consistent with their status as buildings of Royal association and historic and/or architectural importance.
- to help everyone to learn about the Palaces, the skills required for their conservation and the wider story of how monarchs and people together have shaped society by providing public access, by exhibition, by events and education programmes, by the preparation of records, by research and by publication and by such other means as are appropriate.

Historic Royal Palaces is a Public Corporation but receives no funding from either the Government or the Crown, with all of its costs met by self-generated income.

The London palaces themselves are owned by the King in right of the Crown, and Historic Royal Palaces is contracted by the Secretary of State for Culture, Media and Sport to manage the five London palaces on his behalf. Hillborough Castle is owned by the Government and its management is contracted to Historic Royal Palaces by the Secretary of State for Northern Ireland.

Historic Royal Palaces' trading arm, Historic Royal Palaces Enterprises Limited, is a company wholly owned by Historic Royal Palaces responsible for running the charity's commercial activities.

=== Governance ===
The Board of Historic Royal Palaces consists of a Chair and eleven Trustees, all non-executive and unpaid. The Chair is appointed by the King on the advice of the Secretary of State for Culture, Media and Sport. Four Trustees are also appointed by the King, three as ex-officio appointments: the Director of the Royal Collection, the Keeper of the Privy Purse and the Lord Chamberlain. The remaining Trustees are appointed by the Secretary of State, two ex-officio: the Constable of the Tower of London and the Chairman of the Campaign Board. (Note: A specialist fundraising committee.) The Chief Executive is granted a general delegation to act on behalf of Trustees, save for reserved matters.

The current Chief Executive is John Barnes, who has been in place since 2017. Eleri Lynn (Note: Lynn was previously Curator of Collections from 2013-2021.) succeeded Lucy Worsley (Note: Worsley held roles at Historic Royal Palaces for 21 years.) and Tracy Borman as Chief Curator in February 2025. Borman remains Chief Historian.

== Palaces and collections ==
=== Palaces ===
==== Tower of London ====
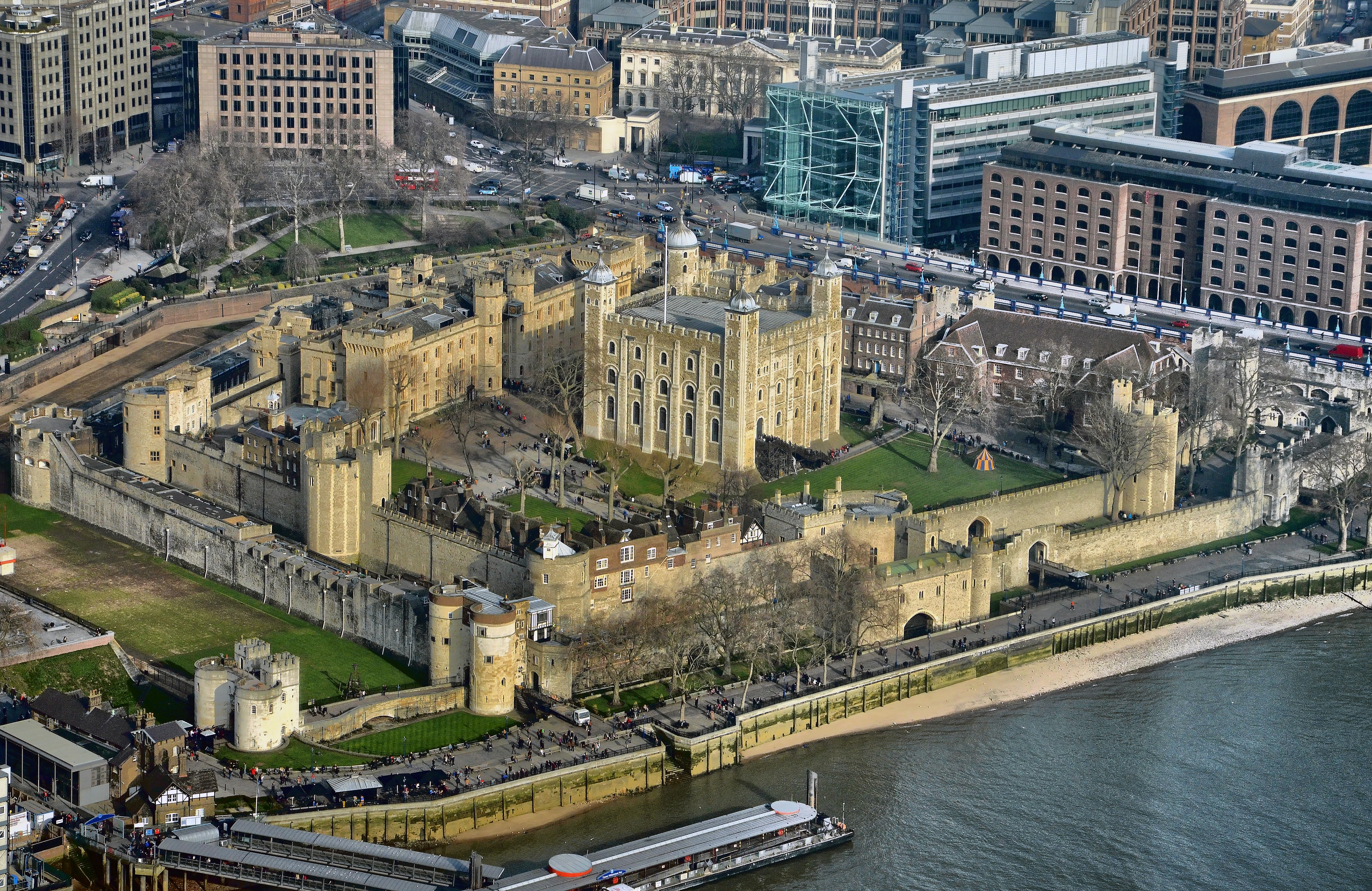
Tower of London

The Tower of London is a historic castle on the north bank of the River Thames in central London, founded toward the end of 1066 as part of the Norman Conquest. The White Tower, which gives the castle its name, was built by William the Conqueror in 1078. The Tower of London has played a prominent role in English history, serving variously as an armoury, a treasury, a prison, a menagerie, the home of the Royal Mint, a public record office, and the home of the Crown Jewels of England. The Tower is a complex of several buildings set within two concentric rings of defensive walls and a moat.

The chief attractions advertised by Historic Royal Palaces at the Tower include the Crown Jewels, the Tower Ravens, the White Tower and surrounding battlements, and St John's Chapel.

==== Hampton Court Palace ====
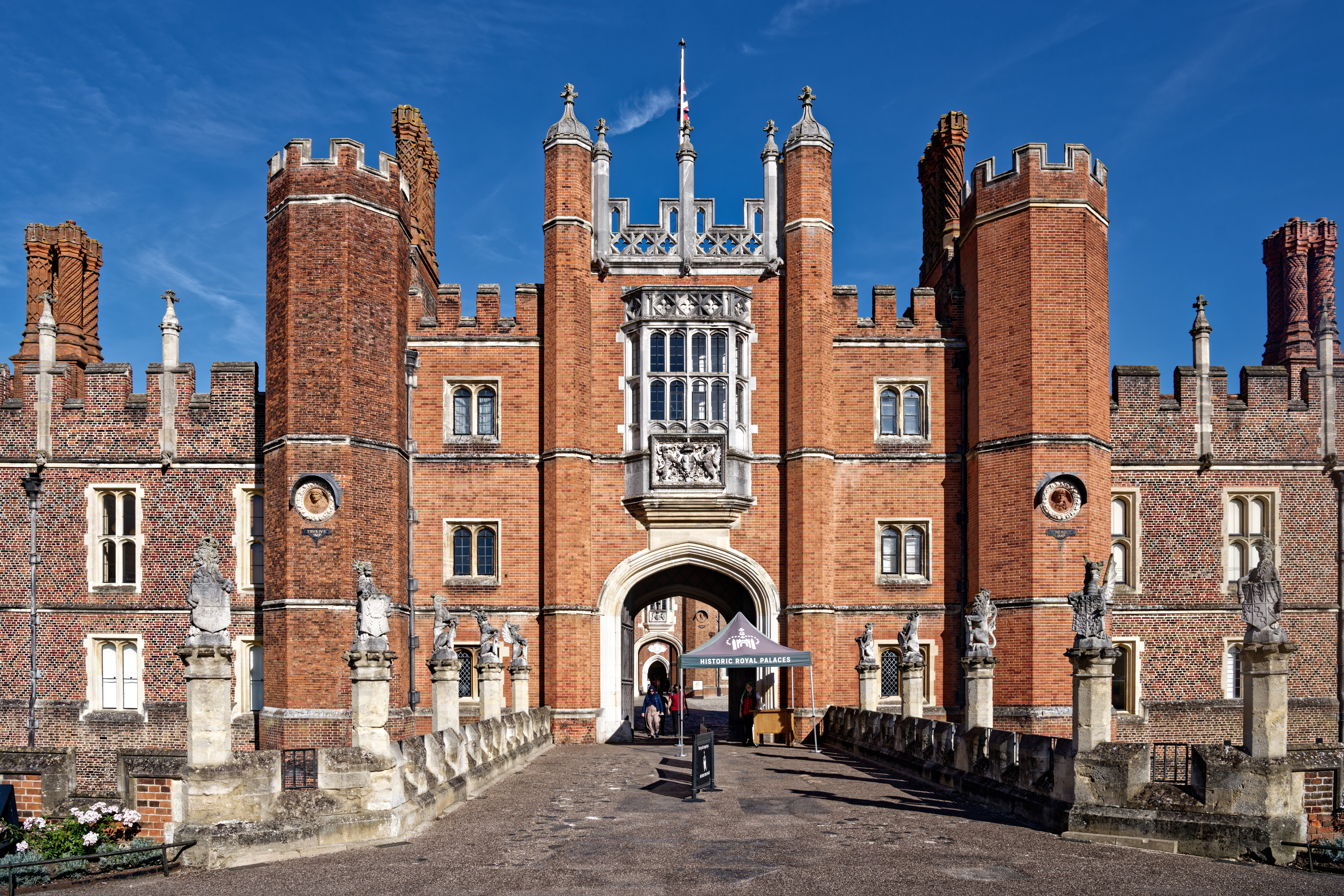
Hampton Court Palace

Hampton Court Place is a historic palace located on the north bank of the River Thames near Hampton in Greater London, in the London Borough of Richmond upon Thames. Cardinal Wolsey began construction in 1514 of a royal palace, which was continued and expanded by Henry VIII after Wolsey's demise in 1530. Hampton Court Palace went on to become a centre of royal power in the Tudor period. The palace underwent extensive renovation in the Baroque style during the reign of William III, designed by Christopher Wren. Queen Victoria opened the palace to the public in 1838.

Historic Royal Palaces advertises Hampton Court Palace as the "home of Henry VIII", focussing on the dramas and lives of Henry VIII, his wives and their children in the world of the Tudor court. The baroque palace built for William III and Mary II, 60 acres of gardens and Magic Garden adventure playground are key attractions.

==== The State Apartments and Orangery at Kensington Palace ====
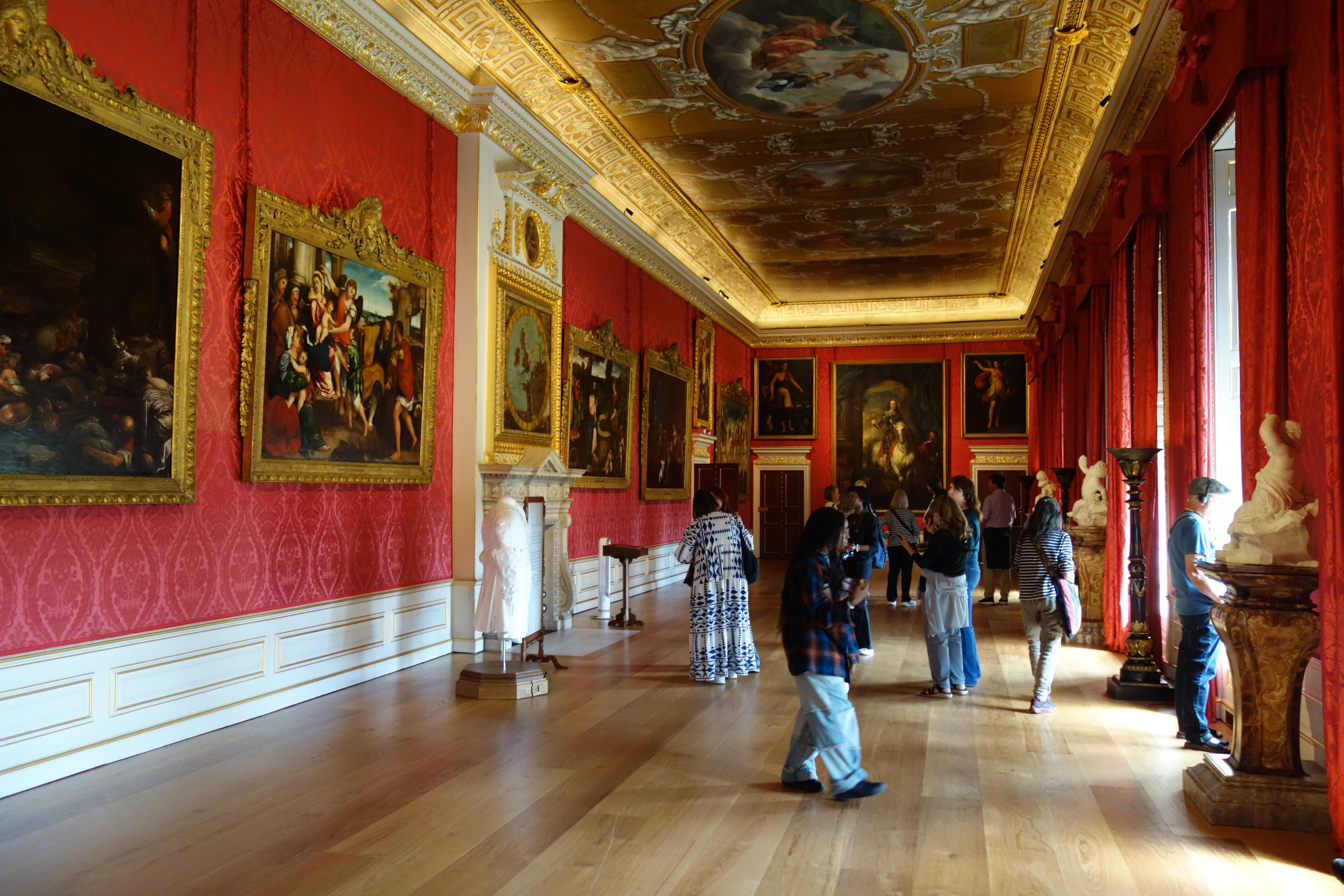
State Apartments, Kensington Palace

Kensington Palace is a royal residence (Note: Currently the official London residence of the Prince and Princess of Wales, the Duke and Duchess of Gloucester, the Duke and Duchess of Kent, Prince and Princess Michael of Kent and Princess Eugenie and her husband Jack Brooksbank and their two sons.) set in Kensington Gardens, in the Royal Borough of Kensington and Chelsea in London. The State Apartments were renovated in late 19th century and opened to the public (see History).

Historic Royal Palaces advertises Kensington Palace as the birthplace and childhood residence of Queen Victoria, with the Jewel Room (containing jewellery commissioned by Queen Victoria) and the Queen's and King's State Apartments as key attractions. The Orangery is managed as a cafe and restaurant.

==== The Banqueting House, Whitehall ====
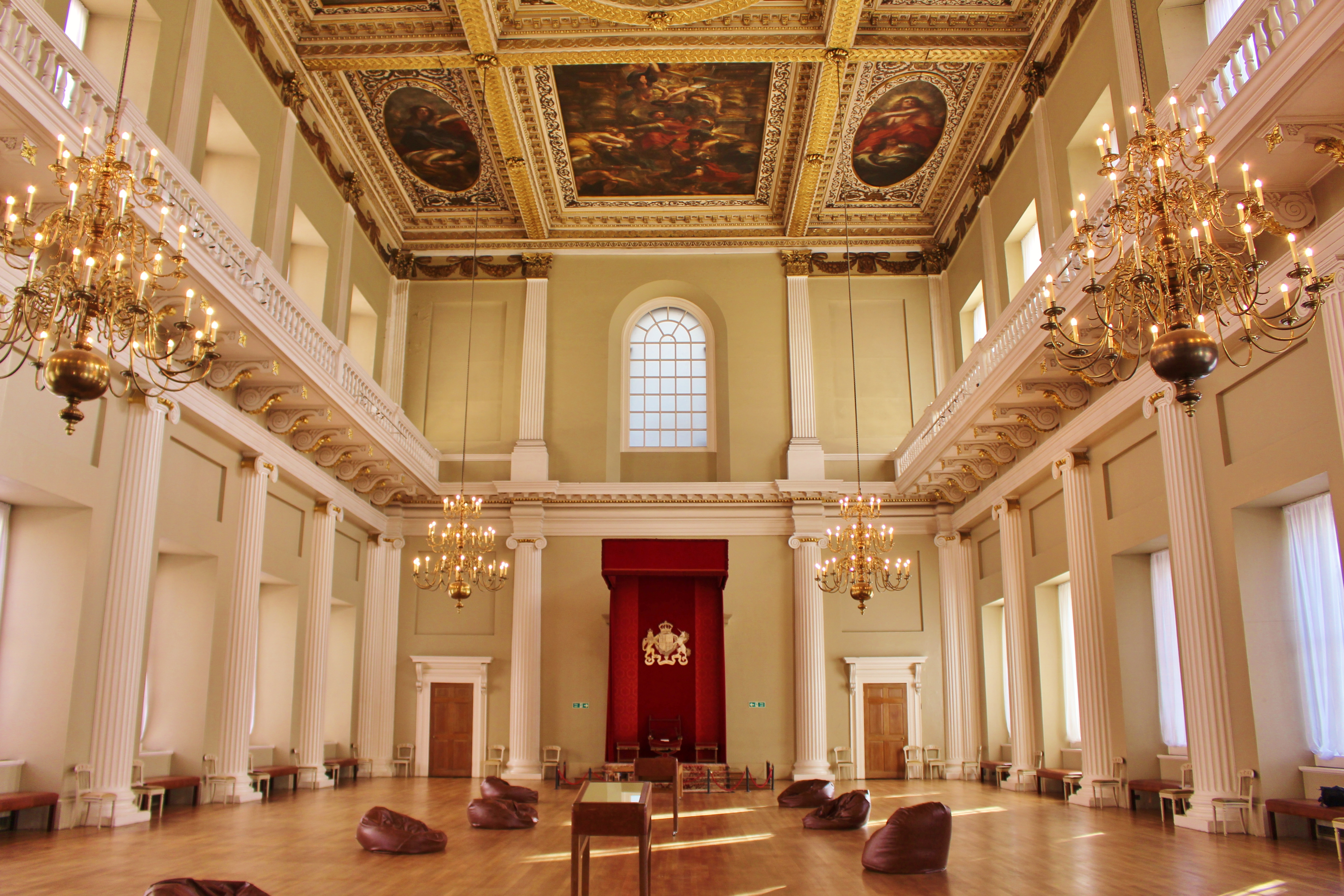
Banqueting House at Whitehall

The Banqueting House, on Whitehall in the City of Westminster, central London, is the only large surviving component of the Palace of Whitehall, being one of grandest surviving examples of the architectural genre of banqueting houses in the classical style of Palladian architecture.

The key attraction of the Banqueting House is the opulent decoration of the Banqueting Hall, including the ceiling painting by Rubens commissioned by Charles I. Historic Royal Palaces highlights Banqueting House as the execution site of Charles I.

==== Kew Palace with Queen Charlotte's Cottage and Great Pagoda at Kew Gardens ====
Kew Palace is a historic palace within the grounds of Kew Gardens on the south bank of the River Thames, near Kew in Greater London, in the London Borough of Richmond upon Thames. Queen Charlotte's Cottage is an 18th-century cottage orné within the grounds of Kew Gardens. The Great Pagoda was built in 1761 by Sir William Chambers as a present for Princess Augusta, the founder of the Kew Gardens.

Historic Royal Palaces advertises Kew Palace as the home of George III and Queen Charlotte. The Royal Kitchens are a key attraction.

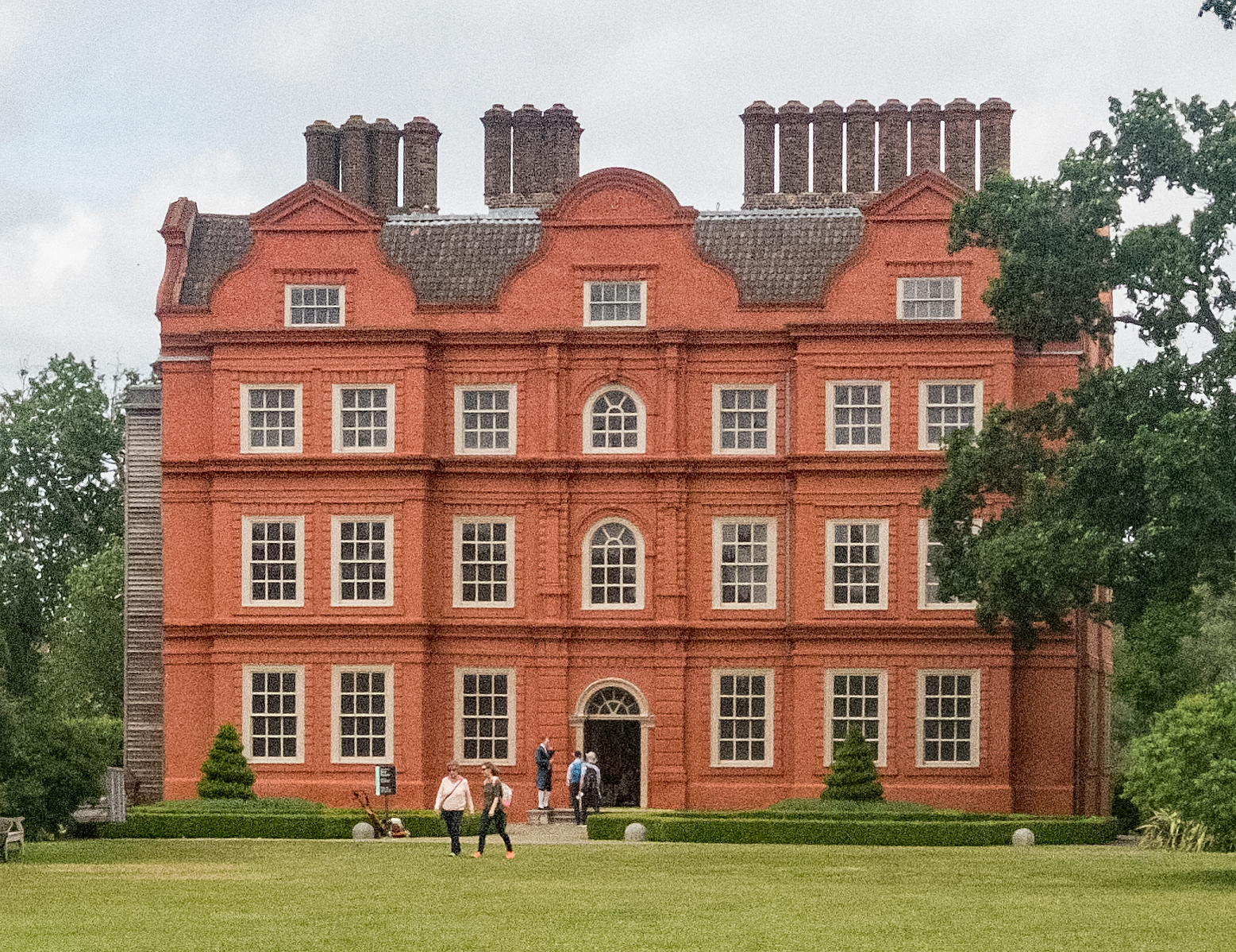
Kew Palace

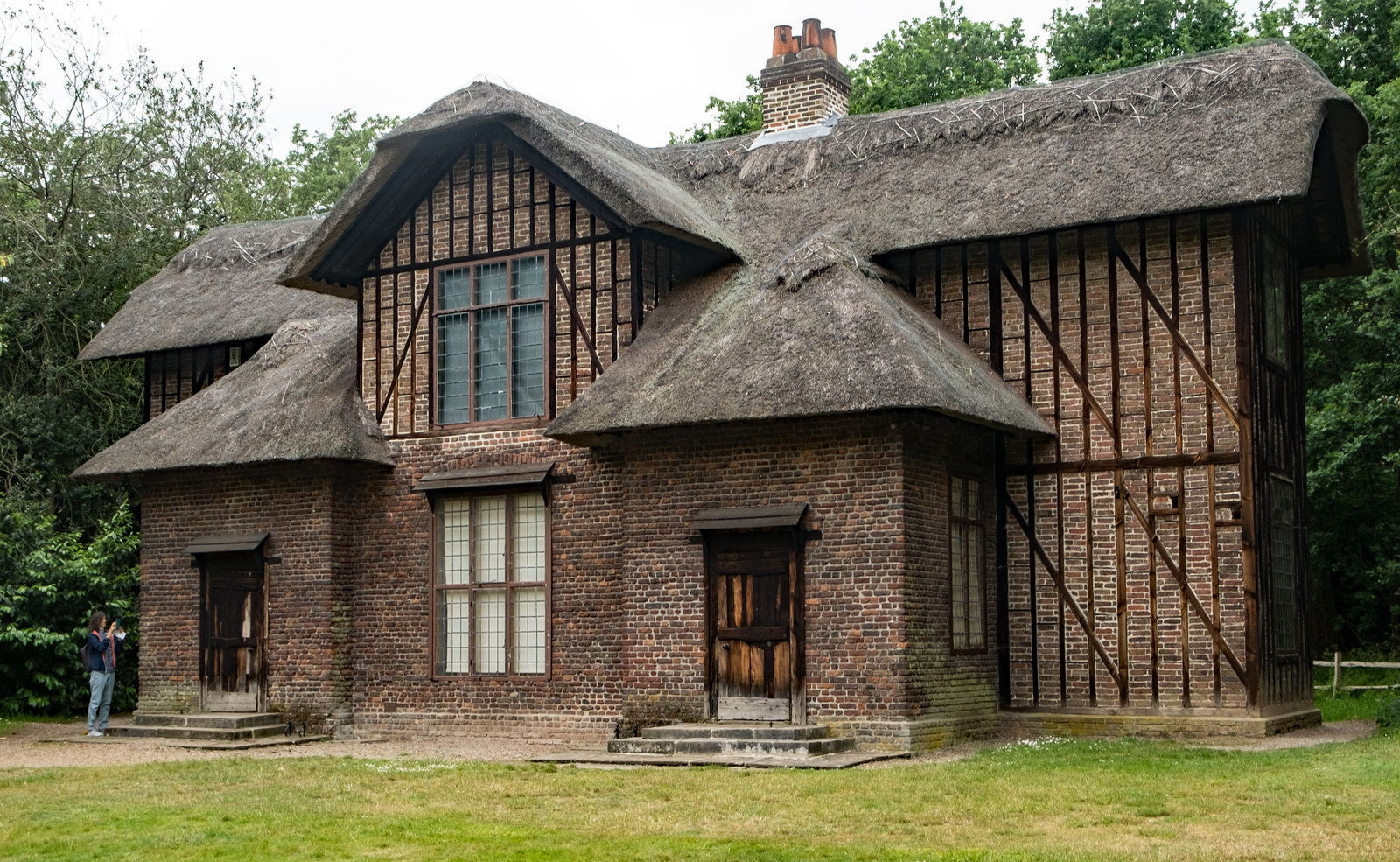
Queen Charlotte's Cottage, Kew Gardens

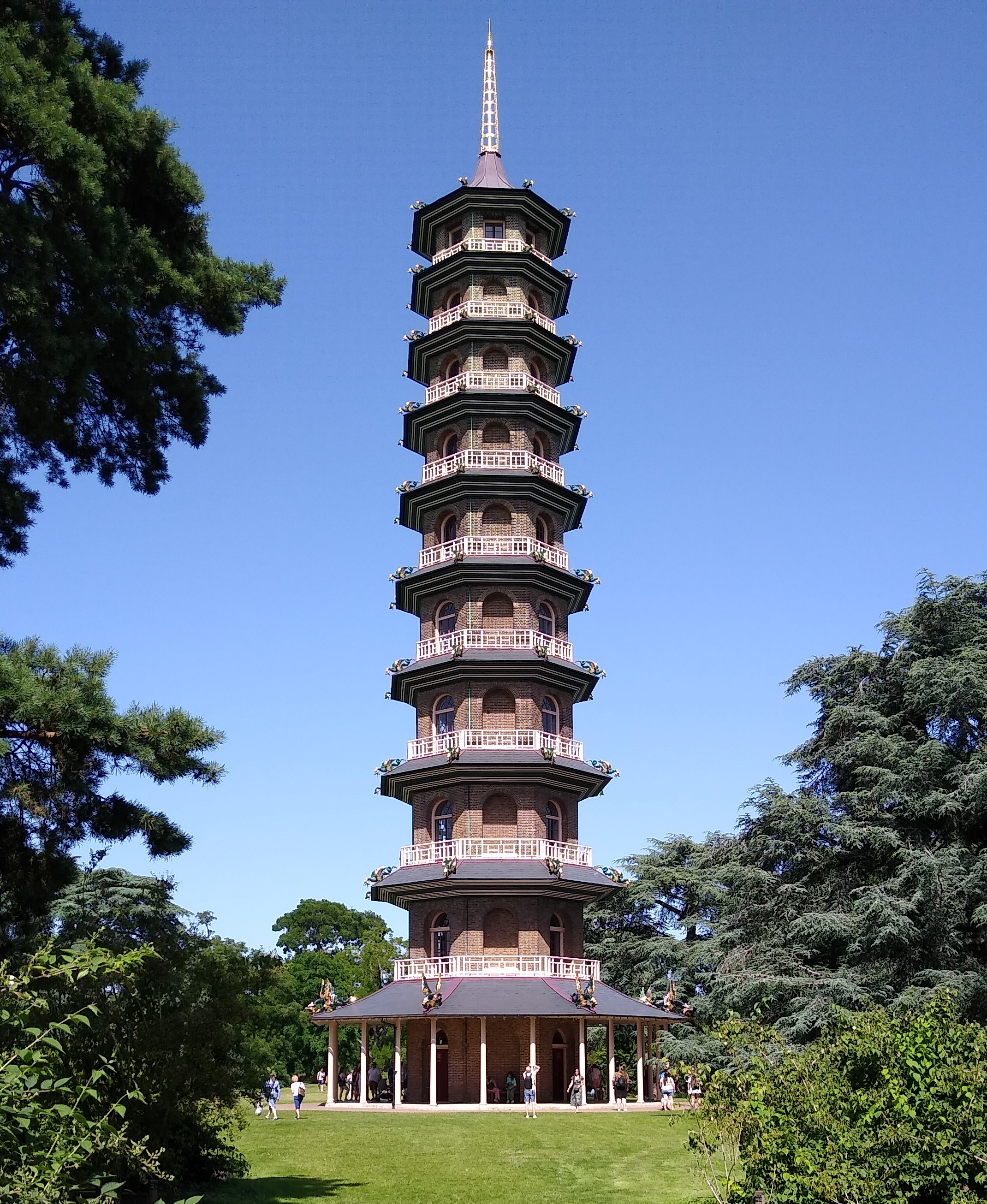
Great Pagoda, Kew Gardens

==== Hillsborough Castle ====
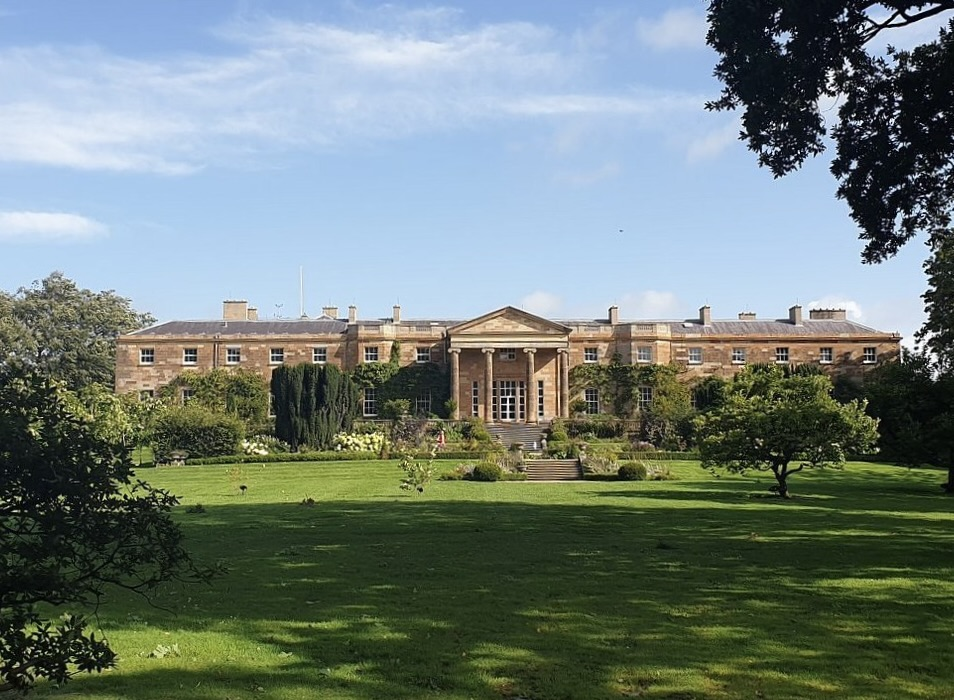
Hillsborough Castle

Hillsborough Castle is a castle located in Royal Hillsborough, County Down, Northern Ireland. The castle is the official residence in Northern Ireland of the Secretary of State for Northern Ireland, and of the British monarch and other members of the British royal family when they visit the region, as well as a guest house for prominent international visitors.

Historic Royal Palaces cites the 100 acres of picturesque gardens and castle State Rooms as attractions.

=== Collections ===
The main categories of accessioned heritage assets held by Historic Royal Palaces are:

- The Royal Ceremonial Dress Collection (~11,000 items), a collection of largely British royal and court ceremonial dress (including the Rockingham Mantua and the Travolta Dress), established at Kensington Palace in 1984.
- The general collection (~10,000 items), consisting of paintings, drawings, prints, furniture, sculpture, furnishing textiles, decorative arts and social history objects, chiefly displayed as part of the historic furnished interiors at the palaces.
- Architectural drawings archive (~22,000 items), containing both modern and historic drawings and copies. In addition Historic Royal Palaces curates ~30,000 architectural un-accessioned drawings in an archive of historic and modern drawings detailing the architectural histories of the palaces in the late 19th and 20th centuries. The drawings are a public record and held as an Architectural Drawings Collection under a place of deposit status at the Tower of London.
- Architectural and archaeological materials salvaged or excavated from the palaces, primarily used as a research archive. (~10,000 items).

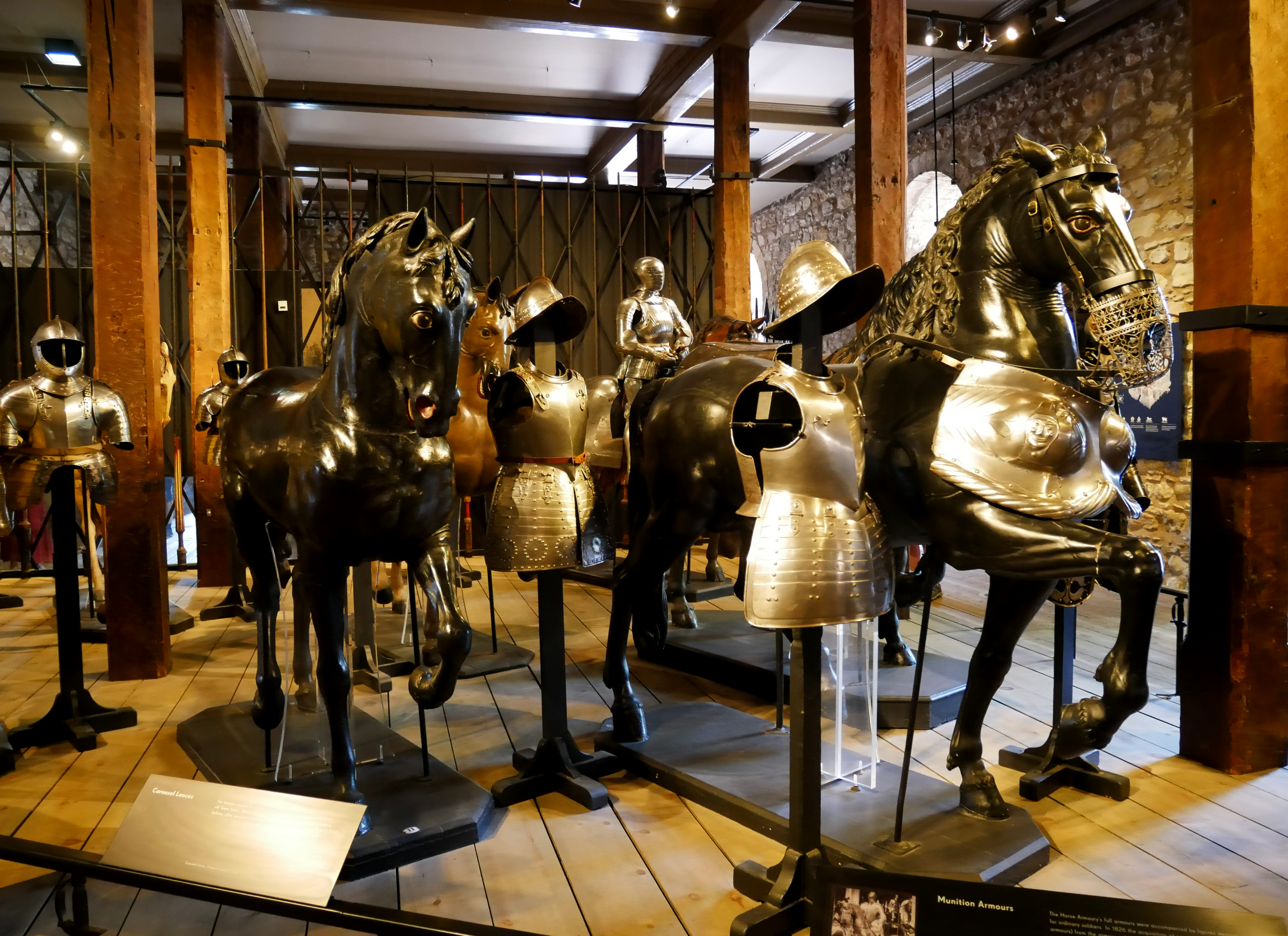
Horse Armour at the White Tower

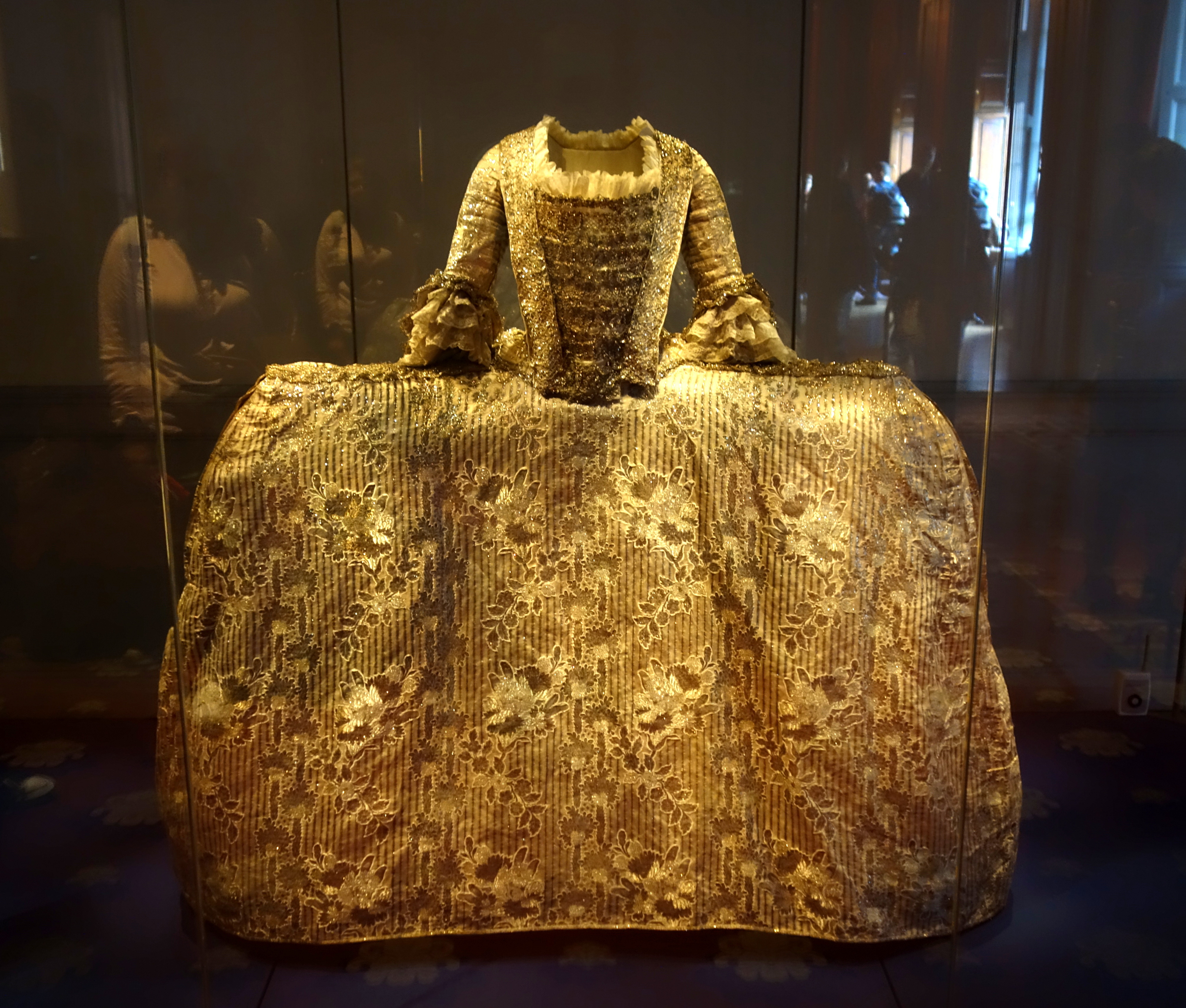
Court gown (mantua), owned by Lady Mary Rockingham, Kensington Palace

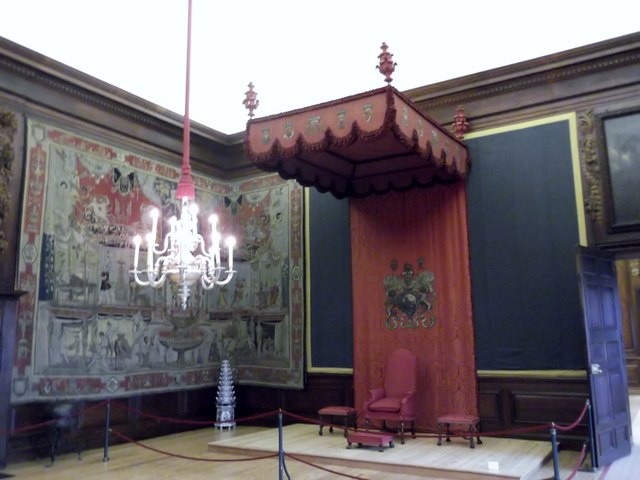
William III's Throne Room, Hampton Court Palace

Historic Royal Palaces also displays items on short and long-term loan, including:

- The works of art displayed and stored at the palaces form part of the Royal Collection, owned by HM The King on behalf of the nation and administered by The Royal Collection Trust (~8,000 items).
- The displays of arms, armour and related material at the Tower of London belong to the Royal Armouries (~900 items).
- The artwork collection and other items on display at Hillsborough Castle (~1,500 items).
- Collection of jewellery associated with Queen Victoria from a private owner on display at Kensington Palace.

== Finances and commercial activities ==
Historic Royal Palaces is a Public Corporation but receives no funding from either the Government or the Crown, with all of its costs met by self-generated income.

Historic Royal Palaces Visitor figures 2025
Tower of London	2,817,852
Hampton Court Palace	782,780
Kensington Palace	429,025
Kew Palace	158,038
Hillsborough Castle	129,021
Banqueting House	(Note: Banqueting House was closed in June 2024 for a conservation and maintenance project.)

The charity primarily generates income from a combination of admissions and memberships, grants and donations, retail sales and other trading activities, and investment income. In the year to 31 March 2025, Historic Royal Palaces total income was £138.6m, more than half of which (£84.7m) coming from ticket admissions to the various sites, £68.3m (81%) of which was collected at the Tower of London. (Note: £7.6m and £6.1m admissions income was raised at Hampton Court Palace and Kensington Palace respectively, and the remainder from the other sites.) Membership income from the 160,622 members totalled £6.4m. Retail income from the site gift shops and online sales totalled £20m, and functions and events raised £7.8m.

The charity's expenses are classified under the principal headings of 'Costs of raising funds' and 'Expenditure on charitable activities', comprising the direct expenditure (including staff (Note: Total staff costs for 910 FTE employees was £47.2m) and support costs) attributable to each activity. Total expenditure in the year to 31 March 2025 was £108.4m, of which £91.3 m was allocated to expenditure on charitable activities, including £36.3m on Palaces (conservation work on both the buildings and collections; research; acquisitions; and maintenance of buildings and grounds), £45.8m on Experiences (exhibitions; special events; online activities; schools projects and programmes; and community events); £6.3 m on costs attributable to fund-raising, membership and sponsorships; and £2.8m on workplace Culture. The remaining £17.4m allocated to costs of raising funds included £12.4m on retail activities.

Tower of London 'Superbloom' 2022

Hampton Court Palace Food Festival

Hampton Court Palace Festival in the Base Court

Kensington Palace 'Crown to Couture' 2023

Promotional imagery used in Historic Royal Palaces marketing materials for Experiences

== History ==
=== Management of the unoccupied Royal palaces in the 19th and 20th centuries ===
Management of the unoccupied Royal palaces in London was consolidated in the Office of Works over the course of the 19th and early 20th centuries.

Informal tours of Hampton Court Palace had been available since the Elizabethan era, and by the 18th century access to the Palace and tours of the Royal Collection were arranged for small groups by the housekeeper, and included in tourists' guide books. Hampton Court Palace was officially opened to the public in November 1838, and the Office of Works made responsible for opening the Palace from Sunday to Thursday (closing Friday for cleaning).

The War Office and its predecessor bodies (Note: e.g. The Board of Ordnance) had managed the Tower of London since the 15th century, using the White Tower as its headquarters and surrounding buildings for storage. Responsibility for the repair and restoration of the external elevations of 'buildings of historical or national interest in the charge of the War Office was transferred to the Office of Works in 1898, with the War Office retaining operational control of the active sites. (Note: The Tower of London, Edinburgh Castle and Dover Castle.) The Tower, along with all its military buildings, staff and tourist income, (Note: Circa £2,500 per annum.) was fully transferred to the Office of Works in 1903.

Kew Palace and Queen Charlotte's Cottage in Kew Gardens were transferred to the Office of Works in a deal brokered by its Permanent Secretary, Lord Esher, whereby in exchange the dilapidated Kensington Palace would be renovated as a residence for Queen Victoria's children, and its State Apartments opened to the public.

=== The formation of Historic Royal Palaces ===
In 1970, the Ministry of Public Building and Works (Note: Successor to the Office of Works) was absorbed into the Department of the Environment, (Note: Along with the Ministry of Housing and Local Government and Ministry of Transport.) a super-ministry created by the newly elected Heath government. The Ancient Monuments Department was amalgamated with the listed buildings section of the former Ministry of Housing in 1972 to create the Directorate of Ancient Monuments and Historic Buildings (DAMHB) as a specialised and autonomous body overseeing English heritage monuments and buildings.

The Historic Buildings and Monuments Commission (soon to be known as English Heritage) was created in 1984 (Note: Under the terms of the National Heritage Act 1983) by the Thatcher government to move the management of historic buildings from DAMHB outside of direct government control. The government did not think it appropriate however that the unoccupied royal palaces be included in the transfer (for fear of the appearance of privatisation (Note: See e.g. Lord McIntosh of Haringey (5 February 1998). "Contracting Out (Functions in relation to the Management of Crown Lands) Order 1998". Parliamentary Debates (Hansard). Parliament of the United Kingdom: House of Lords. col. 844.)), and the regulatory status of the palaces remain split across several bodies (Note: Including English Heritage (advisory), the Property Services Agency (buildings and maintenance), and the Department of Environment (management).) until a catastrophic fire at Hampton Court Palace in 1986 highlighted the deficiencies in the buildings' management. (Note: During an October 1986 site visit a delegation including Secretary of State for the Environment Nicholas Ridley and his wife became trapped in a lift for nearly two hours.)

After several changes in management and oversight, the unoccupied palaces were transferred out of the Department of the Environment to a dedicated executive agency called Historic Royal Palaces on 1 October 1989, to be run as a commercial businesses under a chief executive. In 1998 Historic Royal Palaces became an independent charity contracted by the Secretary of State for Culture, Media and Sport to manage the London palaces on behalf of The King in Right of Crown, and in 2014 by the Secretary of State for Northern Ireland to manage Hillsborough Castle.

=== Historic Royal Palaces during the COVID-19 pandemic ===
Following the confirmed outbreak of COVID-19 in the UK in early 2020, visitor numbers to sites operated by Historic Royal Palaces began to decline from mid-February. On 20 March all Historic Royal Palaces were closed (along with other public venues) and the organisation effectively 'put into hibernation'. The majority of staff were 'furloughed' and the Board of Trustees released reserves to fund the financial survival of the charity. Historic Royal Palaces successfully applied to the Culture Recovery Fund for a £3m grant for conservation projects and in January 2021 received a further £40m repayable loan. (Note: The loan has a 4-year repayment holiday, but is otherwise repayable in instalments by March 2035.) Income for the 2020-21 financial year fell to £12m, a reduction of 89% against budget, and ultimately 284 staff were made redundant.

=== University of Manchester Study ===
In 2023, Historic Royal Palaces partnered with the University of Manchester to support a doctoral research project on the British monarchy's link to slavery, with full access to the Royal Archives and the Royal Collection. The study is expected to be completed by 2026.

== See also ==
- Collections maintenance
- Conservation and restoration of historic gardens
- Cultural heritage management
- Cultural property exhibition
- List of British royal residences
- Tales from the Palaces

== Notes and references ==
=== Sources ===
Davis, John R. (2024). "An Act of 'Queenly Beneficence'? A Historical Investigation of the Opening of Hampton Court Palace to the Public in the Nineteenth Century". The Court Historian. 29 (1): 17–32. doi:10.1080/14629712.2024.2321780.

Historic Royal Palaces (31 March 2020). Trustees' Report and Financial Statements for the year ended 31 March 2020 (Report).

Historic Royal Palaces (31 March 2021). Trustees' Report and Financial Statements for the year ended 31 March 2021 (Report).

Historic Royal Palaces (31 March 2022). Trustees' Report and Financial Statements for the year ended 31 March 2022 (Report).

Historic Royal Palaces (31 March 2023). Trustees' Report and Financial Statements for the year ended 31 March 2023 (Report).

Historic Royal Palaces (31 March 2024). Trustees' Report and Financial Statements for the year ended 31 March 2024 (Report).

Historic Royal Palaces (31 March 2025). Trustees' Report and Financial Statements for the year ended 31 March 2025 (Report).

Historic Royal Palaces (2025b). Historic Royal Palaces 2024/25 Annual Review (Report).

Impey, Edward; Parnell, Geoffrey (2000). The Tower of London: The Official Illustrated History. Merrell Publishers in association with Historic Royal Palaces. ISBN 978-1-85894-106-6.

Thurley, Simon (2013). Men from the Ministry: how Britain saved its Heritage. London: Yale University Press. ISBN 9780300195729.

Thurley, Simon (2003). Hampton Court: A Social and Architectural History. London: Yale University Press. ISBN 0300102232.
