= Richmond Lodge =

Historic building in Richmond, Surrey

Coordinates: 51.4705°N 0.3066°W

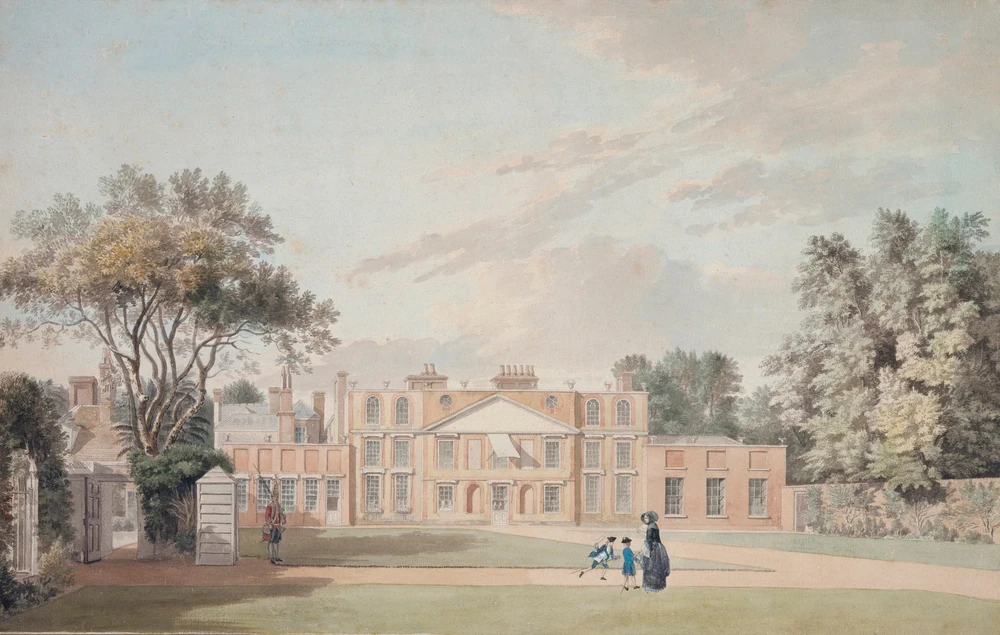
Painting of Richmond Lodge by Thomas Sandby c. 1770

Richmond Lodge was a historic property located near the River Thames in Richmond, London, in what is now known as Old Deer Park, lands belonging to the historic Richmond Palace. It was located close to the King's Observatory. It should not be confused with Pembroke Lodge or the White Lodge, both in Richmond Park, or a variety of other similarly named properties.

It was owned from 1704 by the Irish aristocrat the James Butler, 2nd Duke of Ormonde, who completely rebuilt the house. It was known at the time as Ormonde Lodge. Ormonde was a leading Tory politician and soldier who was appointed Captain-General in 1711 to replace the Duke of Marlborough in command of Anglo-Dutch forces in the War of the Spanish Succession. Following the Hanoverian Succession in 1714 he was dismissed by the new regime. In 1715, facing impeachment by Parliament, Ormonde fled to Paris, where he joined the Jacobite pretender to the throne James. He was attainted and all his properties including the Lodge were seized by the government.

In 1718 the estate was purchased by George, Prince of Wales, who later became George II. Following a dispute with his father George I, part of the wider Whig Split, the Prince and his wife Caroline of Ansbach were forced to leave St James's Palace. During the winter months they established a separate court at Leicester House, Westminster, but their summers were spent at Richmond. The writer, cleric and satirist Jonathan Swift visited the couple there in 1726 and 1727 but was saddened by memories of happier early times spent there with his friend Ormonde.

George III inherited the property, and spent part of his honeymoon with Charlotte of Mecklenburg-Strelitz there in 1761. In July 1766 George met at Richmond Lodge with William Pitt and invited him to form a government. From 1764 to 1771 it became the main country residence of the royal family where they would spend June to October, but the rapidly growing size of the family meant it was too small. It was merged into the Kew Gardens estate, and was demolished in 1772, being replaced eventually as the main royal residence in the Gardens by Kew Palace.

== Sources ==
- Black, Jeremy. George III: America's Last King. Yale University Press, 2008.
- Brown, Peter Douglas. William Pitt, Earl of Chatham: The Great Commoner. George Allen & Unwin, 1978.
- Dennison, Matthew. The First Iron Lady: A Life of Caroline of Ansbach. HarperCollins, 2017.
- Desmond, Ray. Kew: The History of the Royal Botanic Gardens. Random House, 1998.
- Hammond, Eugene. Jonathan Swift: Our Dean. Rowman & Littlefield, 2016.
