= Cottage orné =

Rustic style of domestic architecture

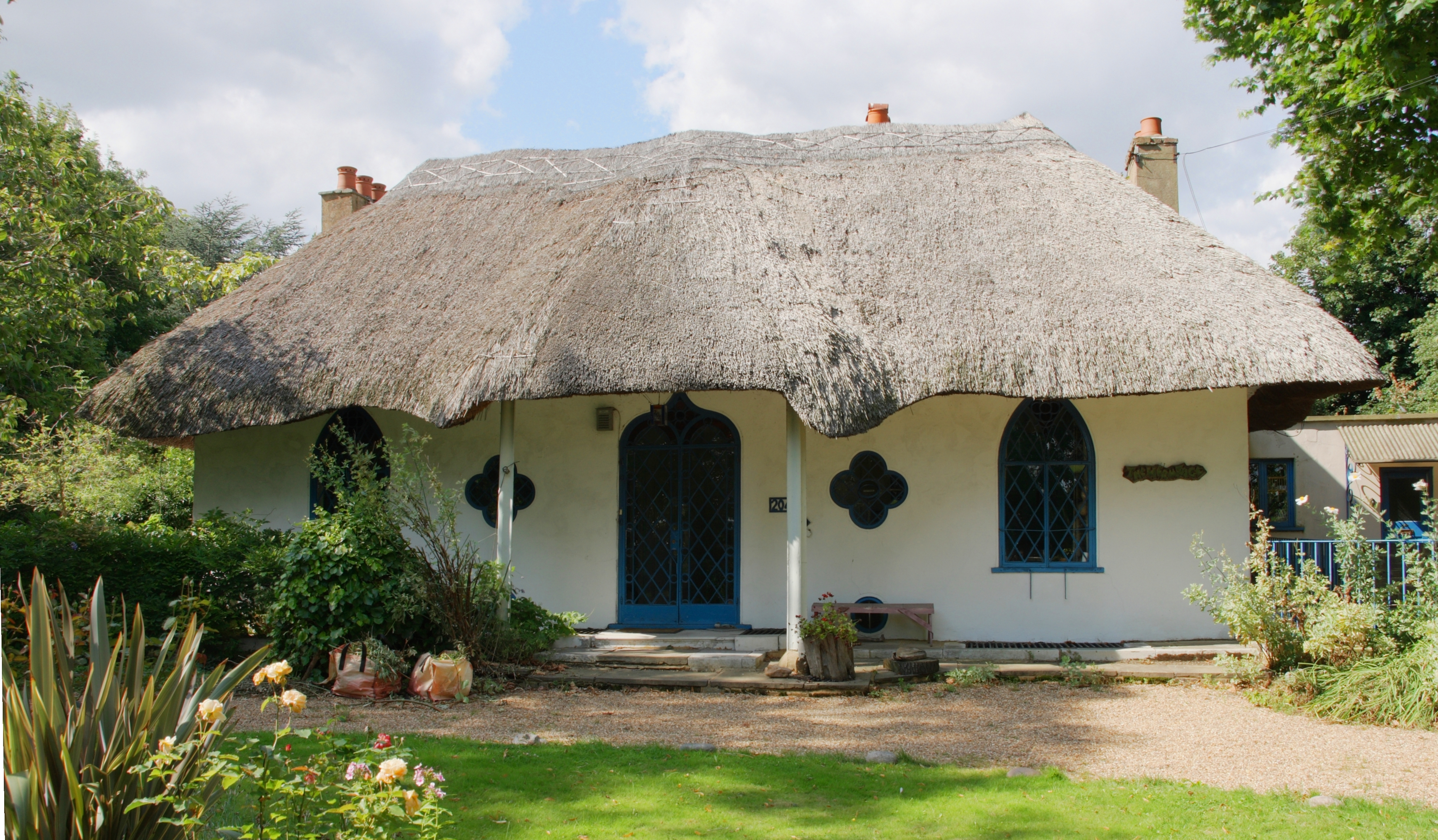
An example of the cottage orné – The Hermitage, Hanwell, in Ealing, west London

Cottage orné (French for 'decorated cottage') dates back to a movement of "rustic" stylised cottages of the late 18th and early 19th centuries during the Romantic movement, when some sought to discover a more natural way of living as opposed to the formality of the preceding Baroque and Neoclassical architectural styles. English Heritage defines the term as "A rustic building of picturesque design." Cottages ornés often feature well-shaped thatch roofs with ornate timberwork.

== England ==
In England cottage orné were often built by the landed wealthy either as rustic retreats for themselves or as embellishments for their estates. They were not necessarily cottages in the usual sense of a small dwelling for the rural poor: examples range from the cluster of retirement cottages built by a Bristol banker for his retired staff at Blaise Hamlet to the expansive Royal Lodge, built by king George IV for his own use. Houghton Lodge, Hampshire, is a fine example with beautiful gardens.

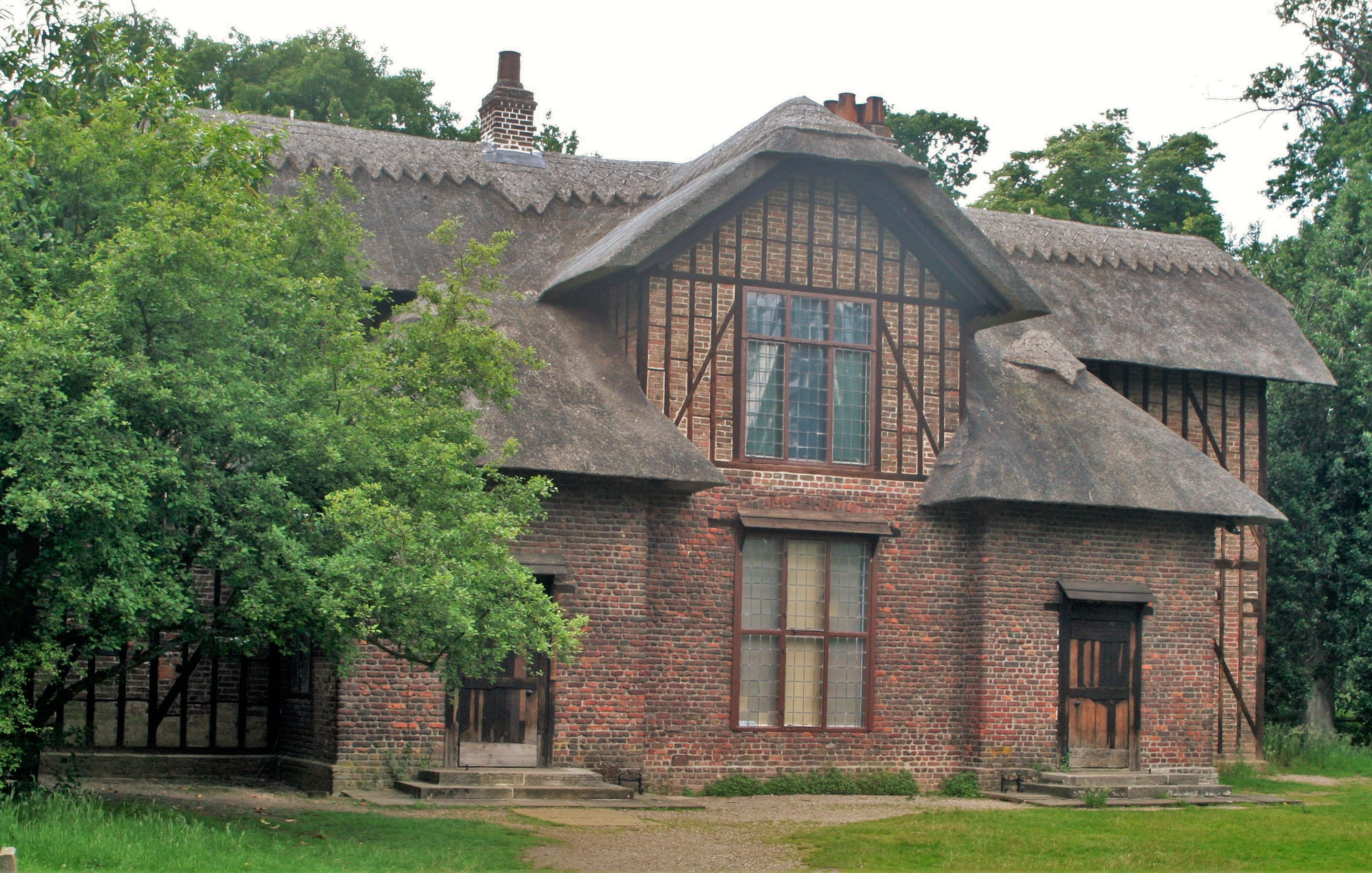
Queen Charlotte's Cottage, Kew Gardens

The cottage orné is the archetypal "chocolate box" cottage, but many chocolate box cottages are attractive cottages of conventional purpose, in no way associated with the Romantic era cottage orné.

An early cottage orné is Queen Charlotte's Cottage in Kew Gardens, built to an idea by Queen Charlotte in 1772, and possibly executed by Sir William Chambers. Originally a single storey, the cottage was extended in 1805 with a half-timbered second storey and a thatched roof.

== United States ==
In the United States the cottage orné was characterized by the use of rustic motifs with a picturesque use of lattice/trellis, fancy scrollsaw work, and lightweight porch supports.

== See also ==
- Bungarribee Homestead
- Ferme ornée
