= North Korean Postal Service =

National postal operator of North Korea

- 조선민주주의인민공화국 우편

Agency overview
- Jurisdiction: North Korea
- Parent department: Ministry of IT Industry

Korean name
- Hangul: 조선의 체신체계
- Hanja: 朝鮮의 遞信體系
- RR: Joseonui chesinchegye
- MR: Chosŏnŭi ch'esinch'egye

Korean Post
- Hangul: 조선 우편
- Hanja: 朝鮮郵便
- RR: Joseon upyeon
- MR: Chosŏn up'yŏn

The North Korean Postal Service (Korean: 조선의 체신체계) or Korean Post (조선 우편) is operated by the Ministry of IT Industry (previously Ministry of Posts and Telecommunications), which oversees postal communications, telegrams, telephone services, TV broadcasts, newspapers and other related matters.

== History ==
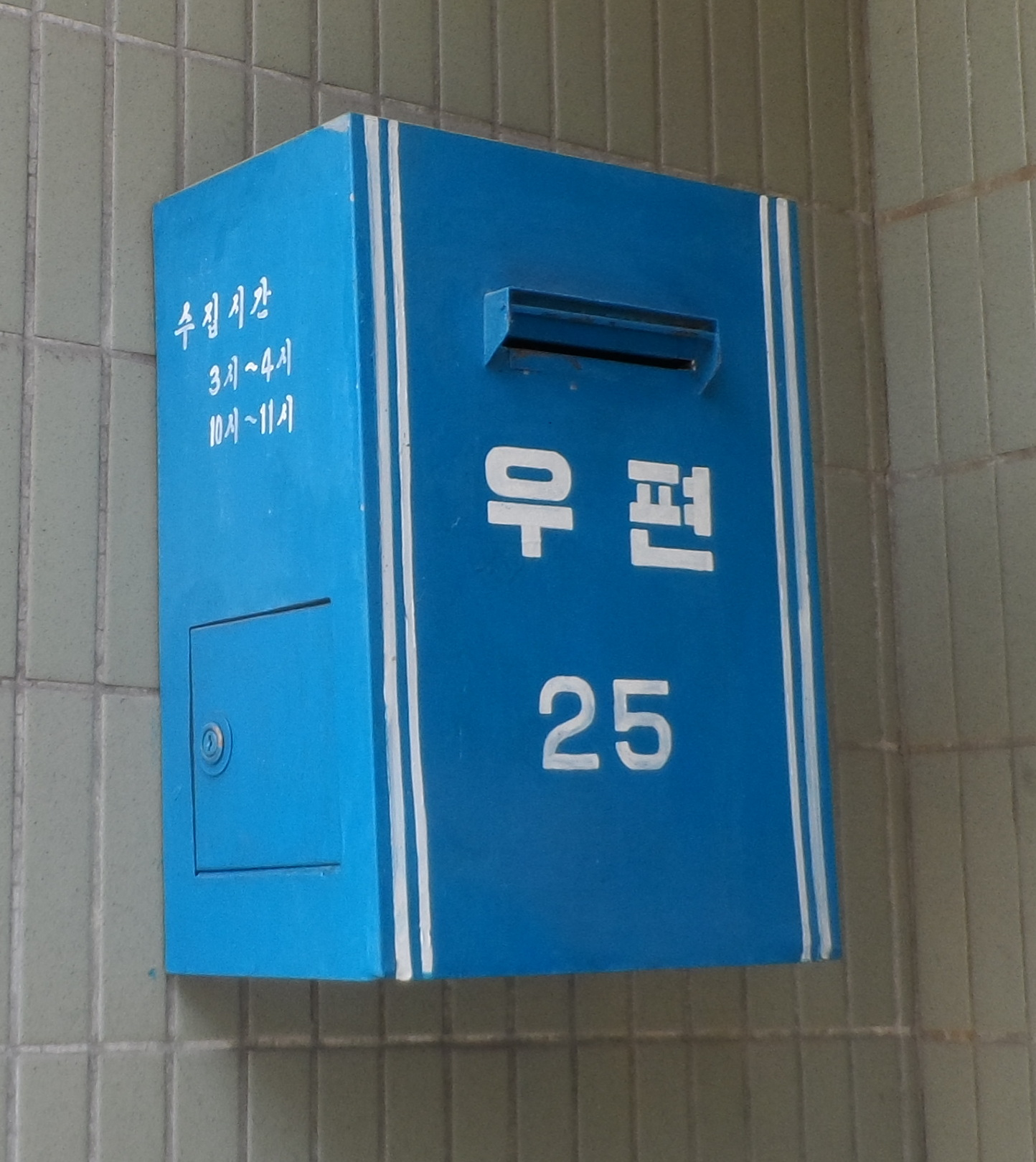
Letter box in Pyongyang

=== Background ===
As with much of North Korea, internal information regarding the Postal Service is difficult to come by and what is learned usually comes from stories of North Korean defectors, the limited number of international business activities and a handful of North Korean research institutes.

As reported by Minju Chosun in 1947, the staff of Ch'ongjin Post Office and Haeju Post Office were commended by the 20th Presidium of the Supreme People's Assembly of the DPRK for their contributions to advancing people's economic, political and cultural causes.

As of 15 May 1952, the Central Post Office of North Korea was the only government building remaining intact and standing in the area, and it was then housed in a private residence with an iron-plated roof. It was relocated in June.

Prior to the famine in the 1990s, the telegram service usually took less than a week and the government provided bicycles to the offices to ensure delivery. However, during the famine (also called the "Arduous March"), postal delivery became more and more sporadic due to food, electricity and fuel shortages. In some cases it took over a month for a letter to be sent from the north of the country to Pyongyang, which is only a few hundred kilometres away and, at times, it is rumoured that postal train employees would burn the letters in order to keep warm.

In 1992, all higher-level officials were fired, with the minister and vice-minister and their families being arrested and sent to prison camps for embezzlement, and wasting funds buying worn out fibre optic-producing equipment from the UK.

Since 1993, there has been a fibre optic telephone service available in places, which residents call the "light telephone". This has reduced the reliance of citizens on telegrams and letters.

=== Modern developments ===
On May 24, 2003, in order to "putting the nation's post and telecommunications on a modern it basis", Huichon University of Technology in Jagang Province was reorganized into Huichon University of Post and Telecommunications, using modern post and telecommunications and broadcasting equipment, including computers and satellite TV link-up equipment, in education.

On October 2, 2003, Meeting of Officials in Field of Post and Telecommunications and Exhibition of Achievements in Post and Telecommunications were held. Kim Jong Il sent vehicles to different post offices and communication factories and enterprises across the country, and a ceremony of conveying the vehicles was held at the People's Palace of Culture.

On April 19, 2016, Naenara reported that the Soho branch of the post office in Mundok County, South Phyongan Province, has established a post and telecommunications service system powered by wind turbines and solar panels.

On May 5, 2020, Voice of Korea reported that Officials of the Ministry of Posts and Telecommunications are benefiting from the photovoltaic power system in Pyongyang, and the Jungsan County Post Office in South Phyongan Province has established the photovoltaic power system and completed the electric power generation system by methane, providing sufficient electricity needed for its operation.

During the COVID-19 pandemic, KCNA reported that the Pyongyang Post Office and the Central Post Office "intensify the disinfection work to rapidly control the spread of the malignant epidemic" on December 25, 2020 and May 22, 2022, respectively.

== Postal system ==
Each province has a branch of the Ministry of Post and Telecommunications and each "Ri" (village) has a postal service office to deliver letters, packages and telegrams. Agents of the North Korean Ministry of State Security are stationed at the Ministry's office to inspect mail and monitor residents. Despite having a postal system and other state-run communications organizations, word of mouth remains the most common way information is spread throughout the country.

The delivery time of mail in North Korea has always been a mystery, but some information can still be gleaned from the available public information. On November 24, 2025, the Chinese Embassy in DPRK announced that it had received a registered letter from a Chinese citizen testing the operation of the China-DPRK's border surface postal route. According to the logistics tracking information extracted from the attached image, the letter left China from Dandong on November 9th and handed over to the carrier for Sinuiju, North Korea. (Note: Therefore, it can be calculated that the mail transportation time between Sinuiju and Pyongyang at this time was no more than 15 calendar days.) Meanwhile, the postal service of North Korea did not return any logistics tracking information for its transportation within DPRK.

== International ==
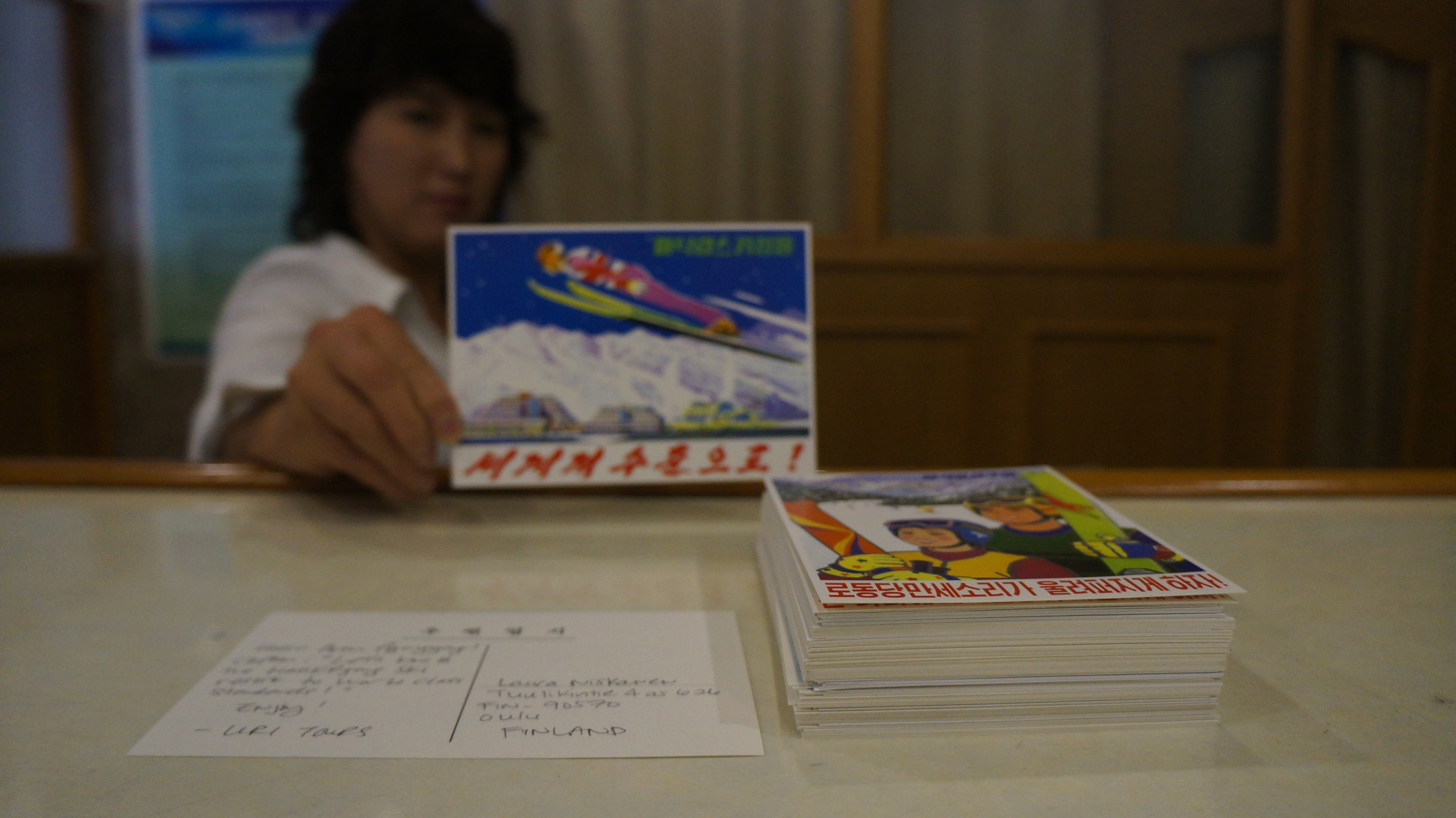
Sending DPRK postcards from the Yanggakdo International Hotel, Pyongyang, shot in 2014

During the Cold War, international postal service was available to all countries of the Communist bloc and to some non-Communist countries as well (but not South Korea). However, its international postal services were gradually severely restricted under subsequent sanctions imposed by the United Nations and other countries. In the United States, any mail is regulated by the Office of Foreign Assets Control and limits mail to first-class letters/postcards and matter for the blind. All merchandise, currency, precious metals, jewellery, chemical/biological/radioactive materials and others are prohibited.

North Korea joined the Universal Postal Union (UPU) on June 6, 1974. Their only registered international mail processing center (IMPC) at UPU, named "Pyongyang International Post Service Center", went into effect from August 1, 2015, with the assigned IMPC code "KPFNJA".

=== With South Korea ===
On March 7, 1946, on the eve of the first meeting of United States-Soviet Joint Commission, Lieutenant General Chistyakov, Commander of the Soviet Army in northern Korea, and Lieutenant General Hodge, Commander of the U.S. Army in southern Korea, jointly signed an agreement announcing that "starting from March 15, mailbags will be exchanged through Kaesong Station, and the circulation of first-class mail (sealed letters and postcards) between the north and south of the 38th parallel will be restored. Both sides will respect each other's stamps and mail markings, and at the request of the authorities stationed in both places, the mail exchange will continue." On March 15, the first exchange of mail between the northern and the southern along the 38th parallel was held at Kaesong Station, witnessed by liaison officers from the US and Soviet militaries. The exchange included first-class and second-class mail. (Note: Of these, 10,000 first- and second-class mail items and 250 documents were sent from North Korea to South Korea (only the Pyongyang postal area accepts mail sent to South Korea); and 300,000 first- and second-class mail items and 10,000 documents were sent from South Korea to North Korea.) Representatives from both sides also signed a memorandum of understanding regarding the exchange of mail. (Note: 第1條 交換種類, 第1·2種郵便物과 書類 第2條 交換場所, 開城驛 第3條 次期交換時日, 3월 29일 오전 12시 정각 第4條 交換方法, 自動車로 할 것 第5條 責任者數, 遞信局員 1명 兩郵便局員 2·3명 第6條 區分方法, 各道別 第7條 行囊交換, 행낭의 差數를 第2次時에 반환 第8條 送達方法, 正副 2통을 작성하여 상대방이 날인함 第9條 事故發生時에는 상대방 遞信局長에게 문의할 것 本協定에 이의가 있을 시에는 兩代表協調下에 처리함.) After that, the two sides exchanged mail irregularly.

On May 5, 1946, the Soviet official Chistyakov accepted the American proposal to change the north-south mail exchange to once a week. According to a news report on December 19, the two sides exchange mail at Kaesong Station every two weeks.

In late July 1946, the Soviet garrison command notified the United States that mail exchange was temporarily suspended due to the highly contagious nature of cholera; the US garrison command would be notified separately when conditions permitted to resume. About 3 months later, the exchange of mail between the two sides resumed, but was shortened to once a week on Thursdays at Ryohyon station, still witnessed by liaison officers from the US and Soviet militaries.

Starting April 15, 1948, the mail exchange was changed from once a month to once a week on Thursdays; on December 25 (or 26), after exchanging mail more than eighty times, the US and Soviet liaison officers were both recalled. At the same time, the US military commander in South Korea notified the South Korean Ministry of Posts and Telecommunications that “from now on, the mail exchange will be under the jurisdiction of the South Korean government, and the US military will not need to participate in related matters or interfere as before.” The situation of the North-South postal route along the 38th parallel attracted much attention. On the 30th, the day the mail was originally scheduled to be exchanged, three North Korean military and political representatives and three South Korean representatives, led by Postmaster General Choi Jae-ho, reached an agreement at Ryohyon to confirm that the mail exchange every Thursday would continue as usual. However, due to Choi Jae-ho’s proposal, the exchange of printed matter between the two sides was forced to stop. As of December 16, 1948, 2 years and 9 months after the two sides began exchanging mail, a total of 314,523 pieces of mail had traveled north and 1,091,678 pieces of mail had traveled south.

On April 27, 1950, at an Interdepartmental Meeting on the Far East held by the United States, it was mentioned that "at the present time the only public intercourse between North and South Korea is the delivery of mail every two weeks", which is also the latest verifiable record date for the exchange of mails between North and South Korea.

On June 25, 1950, the exchange of mail between North and South Korea was interrupted due to the outbreak of the Korean War. A total of 165 exchanges had taken place before the interruption. After the war, South Korea has opposed establishing formal postal relations with North Korea due to concerns about a potential flow of subversive materials.

As indicated above, although an official postal route briefly existed between North and South Korea between 1946 and 1950, it eventually ceased to exist as North Korea–South Korea relations deteriorated sharply and even escalated into war. However, there is an unofficial channel of postal mail sent between both countries via third countries, with more than 80,000 pieces of mail being sent through this system from the North to the South in 1960.

During the April 2018 inter-Korean summit, members of the 20th National Assembly of South Korea proposed 12 amendments to the Inter-Korean Exchange and Cooperation Act. The amendments stipulated that "South Korean residents can report any contact they have with North Korean residents via telephone, letter, telegram, fax, or email to the Minister of Unification afterward, rather than reporting it in advance." However, due to the upcoming local elections, fierce confrontations between the conservative opposition and the ruling party, and the downplaying of the summit's outcome, the bill failed to pass.

On July 30, 2025, South Korean Unification Minister Chung Dong-young approved the abolition of the Guidelines for Handling Reports of Contact Between Civilians and North Korean Residents. These guidelines stipulated the standards by which the Ministry of Unification would refuse to accept reports of contact with North Korea submitted by civilians under the Inter-Korean Exchange and Cooperation Act. Their abolition provides a legal basis for South Korea to resume private exchanges with North Korea, including mail exchanges.

=== With the Soviet Union and Russia ===
As early as August 16, 1946, Posts and Telecommunications Bureau of the Provisional People's Committee of North Korea signed the Provisional Agreement between the Union of Soviet Socialist Republics and North Korea on Postal and Telegraphic Communication with USSR in Pyongyang.

In 2020, postal and communication services between North Korea and Russia were suspended due to the COVID-19 pandemic. In June 2025, Russian Post announced that it had resumed accepting parcels destined for North Korea, with a weight limit of 20 kg and a delivery time of approximately 15 days. Parcels are first airlifted from Moscow to Vladivostok, and then transported from there to Pyongyang by North Korean airlines.

=== With Japan ===
There is no direct postal route between North Korea and Japan, and the exchange of mail between the two countries has long relied on transit via China or the Soviet Union. Between 1978 and 1983, airmail between the two countries increased in frequency, from roughly 90,000 items per year to about 180,000 items per year, with almost no complaints of non-delivery reported.

Since 2006, the Ministry of Finance of Japan has on several occasions imposed economic sanctions—whether to implement or respond to relevant United Nations Security Council resolutions, in coordination with the United States and the European Union, or in the interest of world peace—on individuals and organizations deemed to be stakeholders in North Korea's nuclear program, weapons of mass destruction program, and ballistic missile program, prohibiting the sending of mail to the sanctioned entities.

On July 6, 2009, the Cabinet of Japan issued a file that regulates the export and import of mail containing cash or other payment instruments or securities for the purpose of assisting North Korea's nuclear program is subject to the license system of the Minister of Finance. Without a license, the mail will be refused acceptance or returned.

On March 11, 2016, in order to implement United Nations Security Council Resolution 2270, the Ministry of Finance of Japan took financial-related measures, providing that the export and import of mail containing precious metals for the purpose of assisting North Korea's nuclear program is subject to the license system of the Minister of Finance. Without a license, the mail will be refused acceptance or returned.

=== With China ===
A series of agreements between North Korea and China in the postal sector
| North Korea | China | Place | Date | Name of Agreement | Basic Content | Effective from | Expire at |
|---|---|---|---|---|---|---|---|
| Posts and Telecommunications Bureau of the People's Committee of North Korea | General Post and Telecommunications Administration of the Northeast Administrative Committee of the Republic of China | Pyongyang | Dec 18, 1947 | Provisional Agreement on Postal and Telecommunications Services Between the Northeast Liberated Area of the Republic of China and North Korea | The types of mail handled include ordinary letters, postcards, newspapers, printed matter, and single-registered mail. The Chinese exchange offices are located in Andong, Ji'an, and Tumen. The accessible locations in North Korea include Pyongyang, Uiju, Sinuiju, Hwangju, Haeju, Wonsan, Pukchong, Chongjin, Hoeryong, Rajin, and other places. | Jan 1, 1948 | Feb 1, 1950 |
| Posts and Telecommunications Bureau of the People's Committee of North Korea | General Post and Telecommunications Administration of the Northeast Administrative Committee of the Republic of China | Pyongyang | Dec 18, 1947 | Rules for the Implementation of the Provisional Agreement on Postal and Telecommunication between the Northeast Liberated Area of the Republic of China and North Korea | The types of mail handled include ordinary letters, postcards, newspapers, printed matter, and single-registered mail. The Chinese exchange offices are located in Andong, Ji'an, and Tumen. The accessible locations in North Korea include Pyongyang, Uiju, Sinuiju, Hwangju, Haeju, Wonsan, Pukchong, Chongjin, Hoeryong, Rajin, and other places. | Jan 1, 1948 | Feb 1, 1950 |
| Ministry of Post and Telecommunications of the Democratic People's Republic of Korea | Ministry of Posts and Telecommunications of the People's Republic of China | Beijing | Dec 25, 1949 | Agreement on Postal Services Between the Ministry of Posts and Telecommunications of the People's Republic of China and the Ministry of Post and Telecommunications of the Democratic People's Republic of Korea | Opening up the exchange of ordinary (Chinese: 普通) and special (Chinese: 特种) mail. The two countries' mail exchanges are designated to be exchanged by the post offices of Tumen and Namyang, Ji'an and Manpo, plus Andong and Sinuiju, with each party sending staff to the other party's post office every other day. The time for exchanging mail is set from 8:00 a.m. to 12:00 p.m. every day. | Feb 1, 1950 | Jul 1, 1957 |
| Ministry of Post and Telecommunications of the Democratic People's Republic of Korea | Ministry of Posts and Telecommunications of the People's Republic of China | Beijing | Dec 25, 1949 | Additional Protocol to the Agreement on Postal Services Between the Ministry of Posts and Telecommunications of the People's Republic of China and the Ministry of Post and Telecommunications of the Democratic People's Republic of Korea | Since there is currently no exchange rate for the currencies of the two countries, the compensation amount shall be temporarily handled in accordance with the compensation rules for lost domestic items. | Feb 1, 1950 | Jul 1, 1957 |
| Ministry of Post and Telecommunications of the Democratic People's Republic of Korea | Ministry of Posts and Telecommunications of the People's Republic of China | Beijing | May 31, 1952 | Appendix: Protocol on the Addition, Revision and Amendment to the Agreements on Postal Services, Telegram Communication and Wired Telephone Communication Between the Ministry of Posts and Telecommunications of the People's Republic of China and the Ministry of Post and Telecommunications of the Democratic People's Republic of Korea, and Their Additional Protocols | Further clarify the rate standards and handling methods | Jul 1, 1952 | Jul 1, 1957 |
| Ministry of Post and Telecommunications of the Democratic People's Republic of Korea | Ministry of Posts and Telecommunications of the People's Republic of China | Beijing | Mar 30, 1954 | Agreement on the Exchange of Postal Parcels Between the Ministry of Posts and Telecommunications of the People's Republic of China and the Ministry of Post and Telecommunications of the Democratic People's Republic of Korea | Opening up the exchange of ordinary postal packages | May 1, 1954 | Jul 1, 1957 |
| Ministry of Post and Telecommunications of the Democratic People's Republic of Korea | Ministry of Posts and Telecommunications of the People's Republic of China | Pyongyang | Jun 7, 1957 | Postal Agreement Between the Ministry of Posts and Telecommunications of the People's Republic of China and the Ministry of Post and Telecommunications of the Democratic People's Republic of Korea | It specifies the exchange methods for standard-compliant mail items (including letters, postcards, newspapers, printed paper, literature for the blind, commercial samples, and official documents), insured letters, parcels, as well as the details of rate allocation and settlement insured parcels. | Jul 1, 1957 | Effective |
| Ministry of Post and Telecommunications of the Democratic People's Republic of Korea | State Post Bureau of the People's Republic of China | Beijing | May 26, 2000 | Agreement on Strengthening Cooperation in the Postal Field Between the State Post Bureau of the People's Republic of China and the Ministry of Post and Telecommunications of the Democratic People's Republic of Korea | Handle the mail exchange business between the two countries in accordance with the Beijing Universal Postal Convention of 1999 and its letter and parcel regulations; to set up additional exchange offices in Hunchun and Won-jeong; to open postal remittance business; to use special drawing rights for settlement; and to study the feasibility of launching international express mail service (EMS). | May 26, 2000 | Effective |

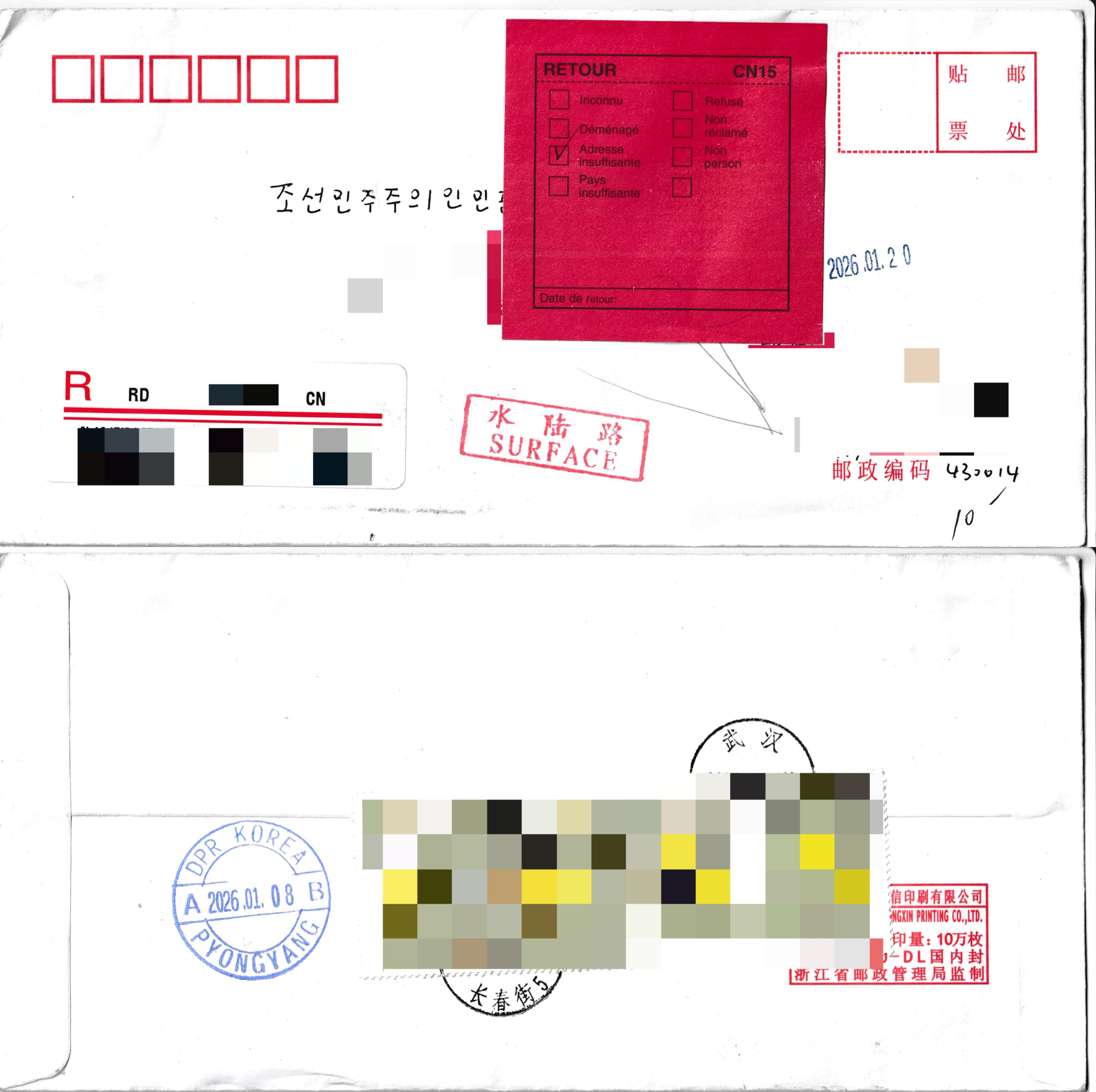
A registered surface letter retoured from Pyongyang, DPRK to the post of origin (Hubei, China)

As approved by China Post Group Corporation and the Ministry of Posts and Telecommunications of DPRK, the Hunchun Postal Bureau and the Rason Postal Operation Bureau signed a border mail exchange agreement. Both sides agreed to open the Hunchun (China) ~ Rason (DPRK) postal route on March 3, 2014, ending the previous history where mails had to be transshipped via Beijing, China and Pyongyang, DPRK. Initially, it was planned to operate two fixed exchanges per week, and later the frequency and number of exchanges would be gradually increased according to the business volume. The main types of mail are letters and parcels, covering daily necessities and all kinds of commodities permitted by the state to be exported by mail. The rate is 10 CNY per letter and 2.5 CNY per kilogram for parcels. However, all mail exchanges were suspended during the COVID-19 pandemic.

As announced by China's State Post Bureau and the Chinese Embassy in DPRK, on September 25, 2025, "following coordination between the governments of the two countries, China-DPRK's border surface postal route (Dandong ~ Sinuiju) has been officially resumed." (Note: In fact, only parcels by surface were restored as of the announcement, while mails (postcards, letters, printed matter, mail for the blind, etc.) by surface from China to North Korea were not fully restored until November 3.) Although the postal route between the two countries had been intermittently opened and closed since the COVID-19 pandemic disrupted it, this was the first time the Chinese government had explicitly announced the official resumption of the postal route.

== See also ==
- Korea Stamp Corporation
- Korea Stamp Museum
- Postage stamps and postal history of North Korea
- Telecommunications in North Korea
- Censorship in North Korea
- Media of North Korea
- Sanctions against North Korea
- Vietnam Post Corporation
- Brunei Postal Services Department
- Mongol Post
