= Korea Stamp Museum =

Postal museum in Pyongyang, North Korea

- 조선우표박물관
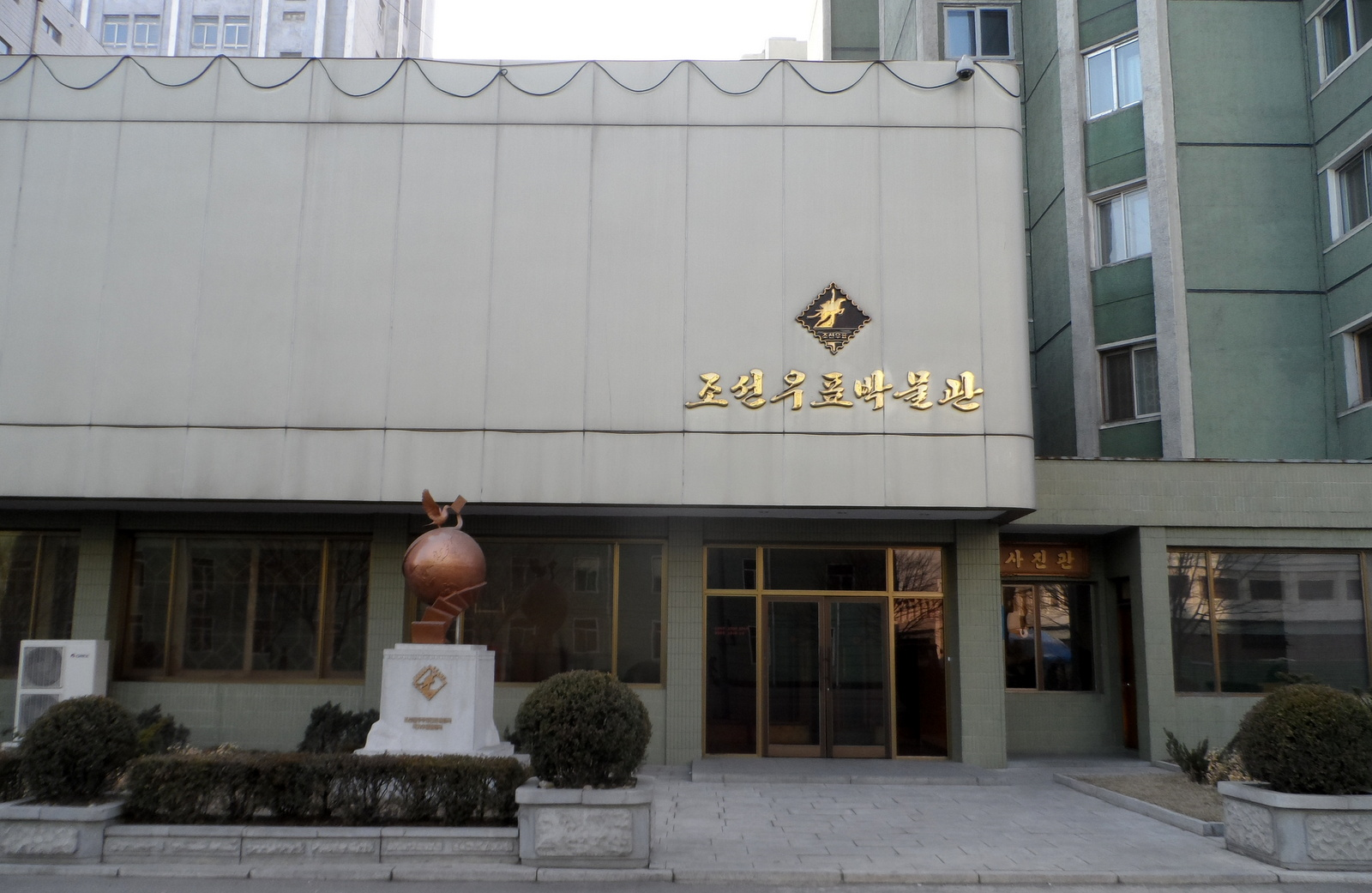
- Established: 9 April 2012
- Location: Changgwang Street, Chung-guyŏk, Pyongyang, North Korea
- Coordinates: 39.007461°N 125.736722°E
- Type: Postal museum
- Owner: Korea Stamp Corporation

The Korea Stamp Museum (Korean: 조선우표박물관) is a postal museum in the Central District of Pyongyang, North Korea.

== History ==
The Korea Stamp Museum opened on April 9, 2012 as part of the centennial celebration of the birth of Kim Il Sung after being upgraded to a museum from an exhibition hall for the Korea Stamp Corporation. The museum closed for renovations in 2018 as part of an expansion project and reopened on February 11, 2019.

== Description ==
Located in between the Koryo Hotel and Pyongyang station, the Korea Stamp Museum is situated in a three floor building with awards from philatelic exhibitions housed in the ground level, a souvenir shop on the second floor, and an exhibition hall on the third floor. The exterior of the museum after its renovation was built to resemble a postage stamp and has a bronze statue of a dove holding a postcard while flying above the Earth located outside the building. The museum functions more as a shop than a museum to attract international tourists and philatelists despite the limitations of international sanctions.

== Collection ==
The Korea Stamp Museum houses over 6,000 stamps, envelopes, and postcards. In this collection, the museum contains relics from the ancient times and artifacts from the postal system established at the end of the Joseon dynasty, as well as relics since the establishment of the North Korean Postal Service including the first stamps created by the service. The museum also houses an album of stamps collected by Kim Jong Il. The stamps displayed highlight events in the country's history, flora and fauna, and world events including the launch of Sputnik, the birth of Prince William, and the 2018 North Korea–United States Singapore Summit.

== In popular culture ==
The museum appeared on the ninth episode of The Amazing Race Vietnam 2019 as the site of a task where the competing teams had to search for a commemorative stamp of Kim Jong Un's goodwill visit to Vietnam in 2019.

== See also ==
- Korea Stamp Corporation
- List of museums in North Korea
- List of tourist attractions in Pyongyang
- Postage stamps and postal history of North Korea
