= Navy News =

UK newspaper

- Front cover, December 2009
- Type: Monthly newspaper
- Format: Online and compact
- Publisher: Ministry of Defence
- Editor: Lorraine Proudlock
- News editor: Richard Hargreaves
- Founded: 1954
- Headquarters: HMS Excellent
- City: Portsmouth
- Country: UK
- Circulation: 35,000 copies per month (as of July 2017)
- Readership: c.100,000
- ISSN: 0028-1670
- OCLC number: 70249744
- Website: www.royalnavy.mod.uk/navynews

Navy News is the official newspaper of the British Royal Navy, produced by a small team of editorial and support staff and published by the Ministry of Defence on a monthly basis.

The content of the newspaper is varied, ranging from information for all serving personnel of whatever rank or specialisation to Sea Cadets and former shipmates. Members of the public with an interest in the Royal Navy, Royal Marines and the Fleet Air Arm also have access to the newspaper.

The newspaper is distributed free to serving personnel (ratio 1:5), and is available to members of the public through subscription or through a newsagent. Up to 35,000 copies are printed each month.

Navy News includes sections on news; special features; sport; book reviews; association news; people; charity work; Fleet Focus (where the ships are deployed); 2-6 (for serving personnel); letters and the very popular noticeboard (on which readers can search for old shipmates, notify deaths and reunions or ask a question).

In 1998 it was decided to create a website which has been running ever since. It always includes regularly updated news stories as well as notifying readers about reunions; people searches and other features.

In April 2007, the first free digital edition of Navy News was launched on the website, and each edition since then has appeared giving free access to readers worldwide; to date over 300 editions have been uploaded.

Another popular innovation is the recording of sections of the Navy News, initially recorded onto 90-minute tapes, but now recorded digitally onto memory sticks with no restriction on length of time. This is then distributed by the Portsmouth Area Talking News to visually impaired persons for free, through the ‘Articles for the Blind’ scheme all over the world.

== History ==
The paper was founded in 1954 (with £300 from the then Victory Barracks (now HMS Nelson) pigswill fund, the proceeds of 'gash' food from the mess sold to local farmers!) purely to serve the Portsmouth Command, after all Plymouth had its own 'Guzz Gazette' and Chatham had its own 'Chats'. Within a few months Navy News' success allowed it to expand to cover the whole of the Senior Service. Today it is estimated to have more than 100,000 readers worldwide, possibly many more, as there is evidence of how individual copies are passed around whole ship's companies, ex-pat communities and ex-Service associations who use its columns to keep in touch with present developments and old shipmates. Not to mention wives and families and, most of all perhaps, people who are just interested in the Navy and what it does.

Embassy attachés and media correspondents scan its pages, regularly picking up items they have missed through official lines of communication. There have been some notable scoops over the years including the cancellation of the rum issue ordered by First Sea Lord Admiral Sir Michael 'Dry Ginger' Le Fanu in 1970 and the full integration of the WRNS into the Naval Service in 1993.

The newspaper is published on the first of each month and the production run is up to 35,000 copies monthly.

== See also ==
- RAF News
