= Japanese post in Korea =

1876–1905 foreign postal system

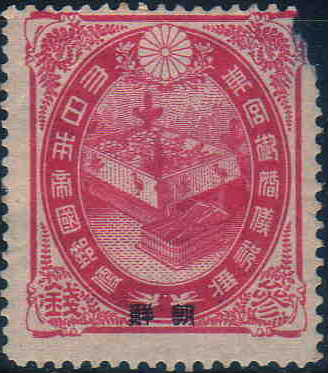
1900 Japanese stamp overprinted for use in Korea

The Japanese post office in Korea (在朝鮮日本郵便局, Zai-Chōsen-Nippon Yūbin Kyoku) was a postal administration established by the Meiji period Empire of Japan in late Joseon dynasty Korea.

== History ==
The first Japanese post office in Korea was established in 1876 under the terms of the Japan–Korea Treaty of 1876 in Japanese consulate district within the open port of Busan. Post offices in Wonsan and Incheon (Chemulpo), ports which had also been opened to foreign trade by the treaty, were established in 1880 and 1883, respectively. A post office was also established in the capital of Seoul in 1888. Additional Japanese post offices/agencies were opened from 1896, particular from 1899, first in other treaty ports including Masan and Gunsan, then other inland places, predominantly as a political measure, as few initially made a profit.

Initially, these post offices used stamps of Japan; however, from January 1, 1900 through April 28, 1900, stamps of Japan were overprinted with the kanji for Korea (朝鮮, Chosen) .

== Inauguration ==
The inauguration of a Korean postal system initially was attempted in November 1884, but soon was interrupted by the Gapsin Coup half a month later, and officially terminated. Korea resumed its own postal service in 1895, domestic business only in the beginning. By 1 January 1900 Korea became a full member of the Universal Postal Union, with its own foreign postal service, which was able to compete against the Japanese post system. Many foreigners resident in Korea, including many Japanese, preferred to use the Korean postal service to write overseas, as the depreciated Korean silver currency resulted in somewhat cheaper postal rates. However, following the Russo-Japanese War and the annexation of Korea in 1905, the entire Korean Empire postal services became amalgamated with the Japanese postal services, and Japanese post stamps continued to be used in Korea until the end of World War II.

== See also ==
- Postage stamps and postal history of Korea
- Keijō Post Office – 1915–1957 post office in colonial Korea and early South Korea
