= Postage stamps and postal history of Korea =

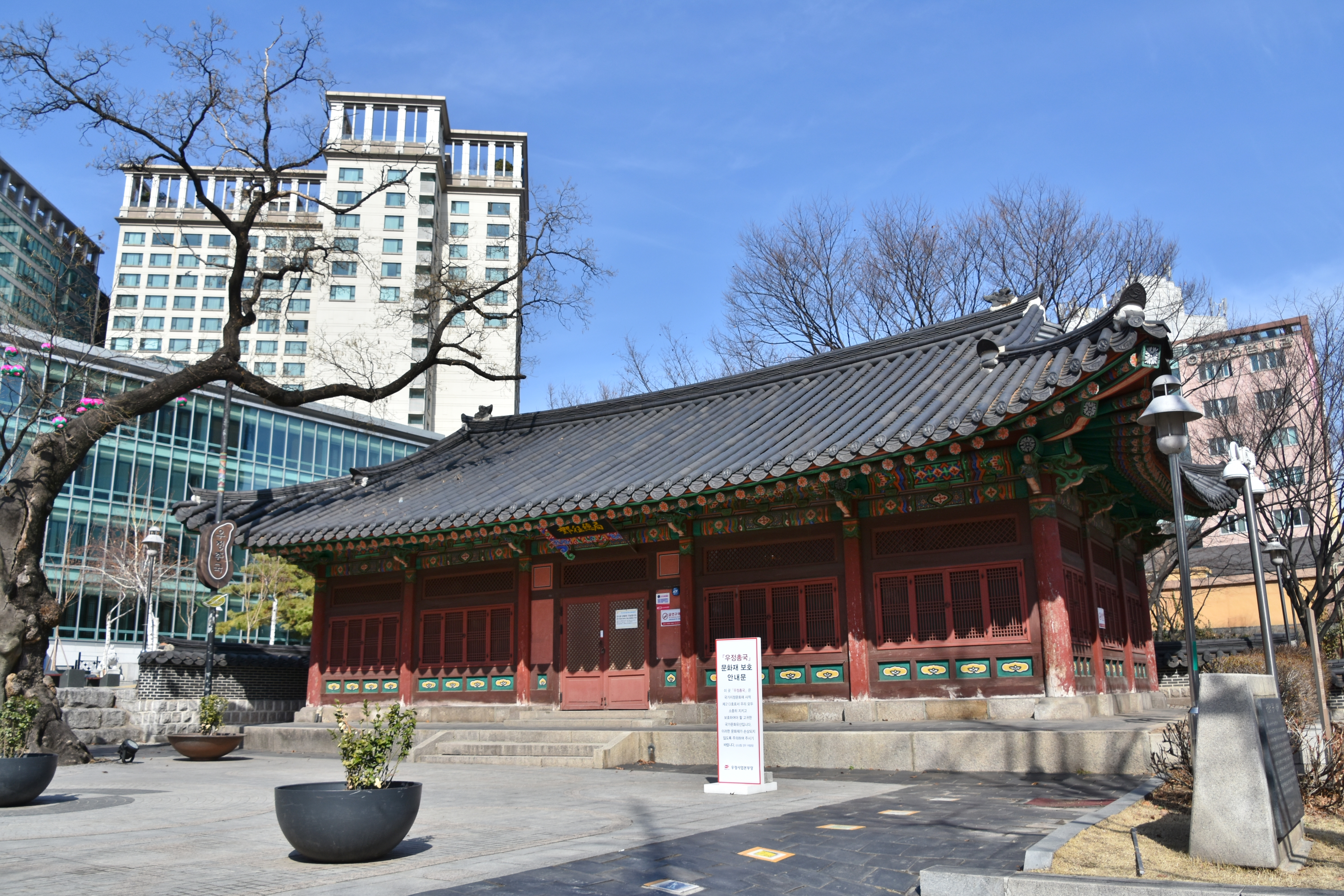
The first post office of Korea, Ujeongchongguk (우정총국)

This is a survey of the postage stamps and postal history of Korea. Before a strict isolationist country, Korea began to open up in the second half of the 19th century.

Following the Japan–Korea Treaty of 1876, the Empire of Japan established the first post office in Japanese consulate district within the open port of Busan. Hong Yeong-shik, a reformist official during the late Joseon dynasty, remonstrated that the Japanese government is operating postal services in Busan without consent. At the same time, Hong also had an interest in postal services and whilst visiting Japan and the United States as a diplomatic delegation, he chose to inspect local post offices and learn the workings of postal system. On April 22, 1884, the first Korean post office, Ujeongchongguk (우정총국), was set up in Seoul and Hong became the first Postmaster-General.

Prior to the beginning of postal services, Korea signed postal treaties with Japan and British Hong Kong, and further intended to join Universal Postal Union. Postal services in Korea officially began on November 18, 1884, when a service was established between Seoul and Incheon. After Korea was annexed by Japan in 1910, the Japanese government took over postal services and brought Japanese stamps for use in Korea.

== Stamps of Joseon dynasty ==
Korea issued its own stamps on November 18, 1884, when the first postal service was created. 5, 10, 25, 50 and 100 mun values were printed for the first time, but only the 5 and 10 mun stamps were issued. Theses stamps were printed by the Japanese Paper Money Bureau of Ministry of the Treasury. Decoration of the background and empty space of these stamps include geometrical circle, lotus petal, bat, cloud, peony, lattice, flowering plant and arabesque design.

Nearly 3 million of these stamps were printed, but these saw little use as the post office was burned down during the Gapsin Coup in December 1884. In early 1886, unused stamps were granted to the Heinrich Constantin Eduard Meyer & Company, a German company based in Hamburg, to make payment for the cost of printing stamps to Japan.

First stamps

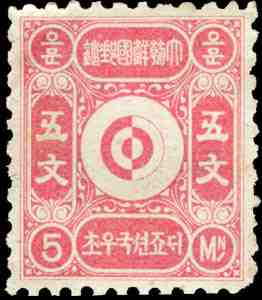
5 mun

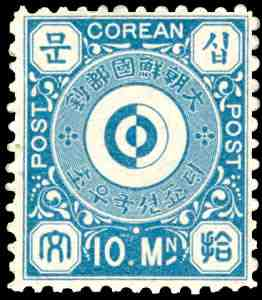
10 mun

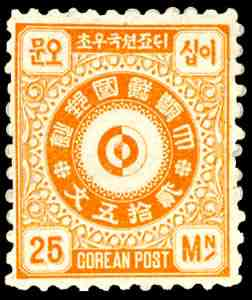
25 mun (unissued)

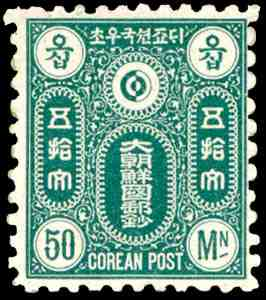
50 mun (unissued)

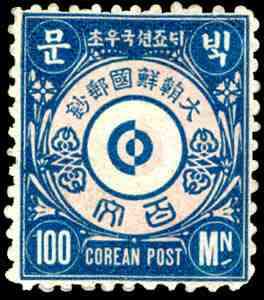
100 mun (unissued)

The next series of stamps did not appear until 1895 when the postal service was reintroduced. The stamps of the 1895 series consisted of four values: 5, 10, 25 and 50 poon. All these stamps were printed by the Andrew B. Graham Co., a company based in Washington, D.C., and featured a taegeuk symbol. They were overprinted "Dae Han" in 1897, in accordance with the proclamation of the Korean Empire, and surcharged to 1 poon in 1900.

1895 Series

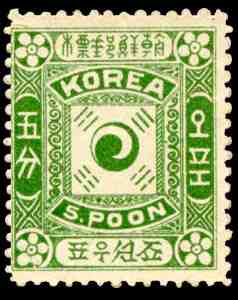
5 poon

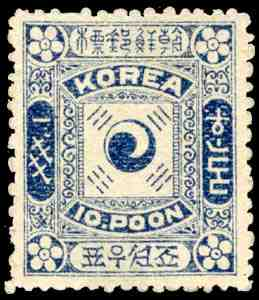
10 poon

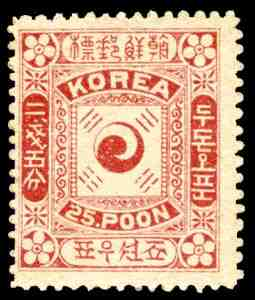
25 poon

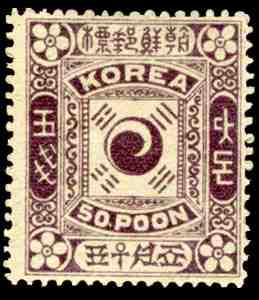
50 poon

== Stamps of Korean Empire ==
On January 1, 1900, Korea became a member of the Universal Postal Union. It was also in 1900 that the Korean Empire introduced a series of 13 stamps, with values ranging from 2 re to 2 won. These stamps are the first stamps printed in Korea and known to collectors as the "Plum Blossom stamps" because all the designs have a common theme of the plum blossom and taegeuk symbol. The frames are different for each value, and the three highest values are printed in two colours each. At that time, the plum blossom was adopted as a royal emblem, but the plum blossom emblem was used widely not only for a symbol for royal families but also for a national symbol. In 1902 five of these stamps were surcharged using black handstamps.

1900 Series

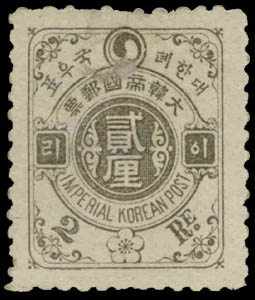
2 re

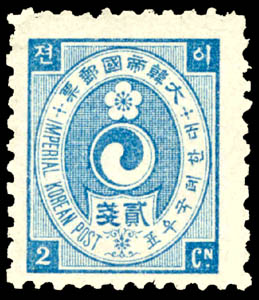
2 chon

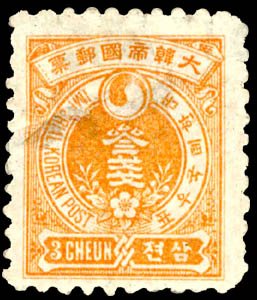
3 chon

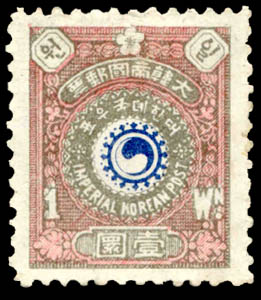
1 won

Korea issued its first and last commemorative stamp on 18 October 1902, marking the 40th anniversary of the reign of Emperor Gojong. The orange stamp depicted the emperor's crown.

In 1903, Korea issued a set of 13 stamps depicting a vulture or falcon symbol. Issuing these stamps were promoted by Jean Victor Emile Clemencet, a French postal service advisor to the government of Korea, and they were printed in Paris. When considering the bird emblem holding a globe and a sword, the design was possibly influenced by the Russian ruble banknotes or Japan's 1875 stamp depicting Northern goshawk.

However, in 1910, Japan assumed administrative control of Korea, and subsequently all mail used Japanese Chosēn stamps. This state of affairs continued until early 1945 after liberation.

== Stamps of Korea under Japanese rule ==
Before the annexation of Korea by Japan, some Japanese stamps were already used by Japanese post offices in Korea. From January 1, 1900, through April 28, 1900, Japanese stamps were overprinted with the kanji for Korea (朝鮮, Chosen). After Japan formally annexed Korea in 1910, the entire Korean postal services became a part of Japanese postal services, and Japanese stamps were used in Korea until the end of World War II.

After the liberation of Korea, former Japanese stamps were temporarily overprinted "Joseon stamp" by the United States Army Military Government in Korea. These overprinted stamps were in circulation in 1946. Soon the first stamps of liberated Korea were issued, commemorating the first anniversary of the independence.

Japanese stamps in Korea

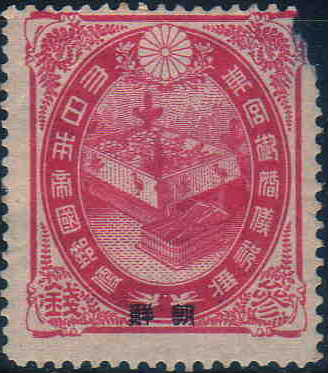
Japanese 3 sen stamp overprinted for use in Korea, 1900

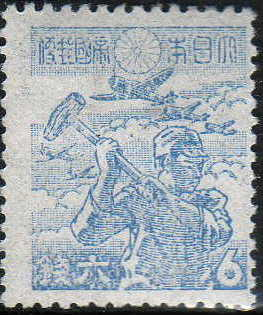
Japanese 6 sen stamp, 1944

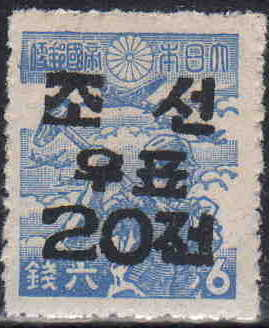
Japanese 6 sen stamp overprinted for use in United States Army Military Government in Korea, 1946

== See also ==
- Postage stamps and postal history of North Korea
- Postage stamps and postal history of South Korea
- Japanese post in Korea
- Keijō Post Office – 1915–1957 post office of colonial Korea and early South Korea
