= Korea Post =

South Korean postal service

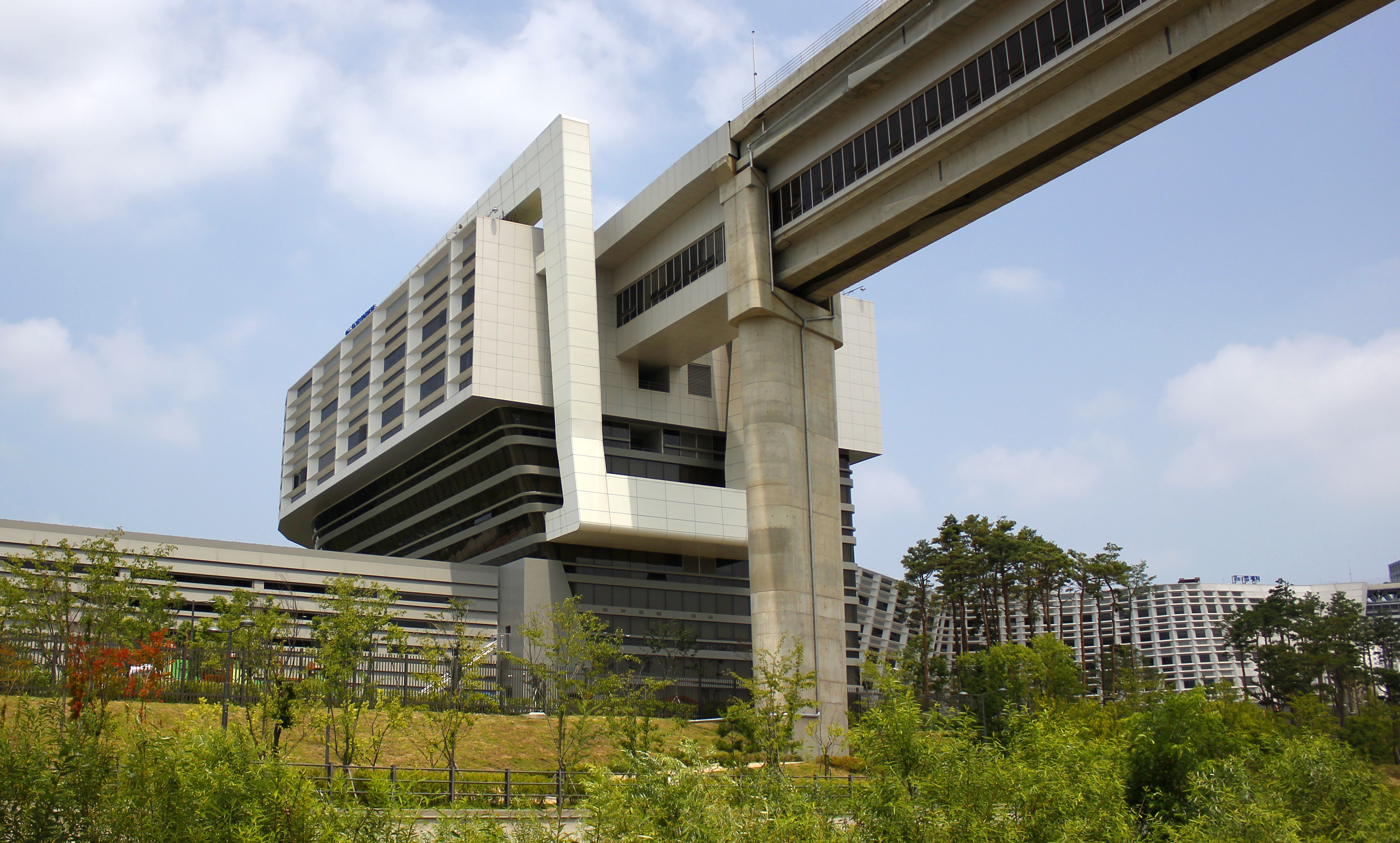
- Headquarters in Sejong City, South Korea (2016)
- Type: Government statutory agency
- Industry: Postal services; Retail; E-Commerce; Logistics; Printing services; Finance; Banking; distribution; Insurance; E-Commerce
- Founded: March 27, 1884; 142 years ago (as Department of Postal Administration); July 1, 1946; 80 years ago (as Ministry of Postal Services); July 1, 2000; 26 years ago (as Korea Post)
- Headquarters: Sejong City, Chungnam, South Korea
- Key people: Kang Seong Ju (President of Korea Post)
- Products: National and International mail; delivery and special handling; third-party logistics; insurance, banking and postal savings; E-commerce; Retail; Parcel Delivery
- Revenue: 2,333,583,000,000 KRW (2013)
- Parent: Ministry of Science and ICT
- Website: koreapost.go.kr Korea Post in English; Korea Post Shopping Mall

- Korea Post
- Hangul: 우정사업본부
- Hanja: 郵政事業本部
- RR: Ujeong saeop bonbu
- MR: Ujŏng saŏp ponbu

Korea Post is the national postal service of South Korea, under the authority of the Ministry of Science and ICT, formerly Ministry of Knowledge Economy until 2013. Korea Post is in charge of postal service, postal banking, E-commerce and Parcel Delivery and insurance services. Its headquarters are in Sejong City of Chungnam.

== Functions ==
Korea Post is charged with providing the following postal and financial services at post offices:

- Basic postal service (handling and delivering mail and parcels)
- Additional postal services (registered mail, customer pickup, P.O. Box, sales of local products by mail order and postal errand service)
- Postal savings, money orders and postal giro
- Postal insurance.
- Postal E-Commerce
- Parcel Delivery

== Organisation ==
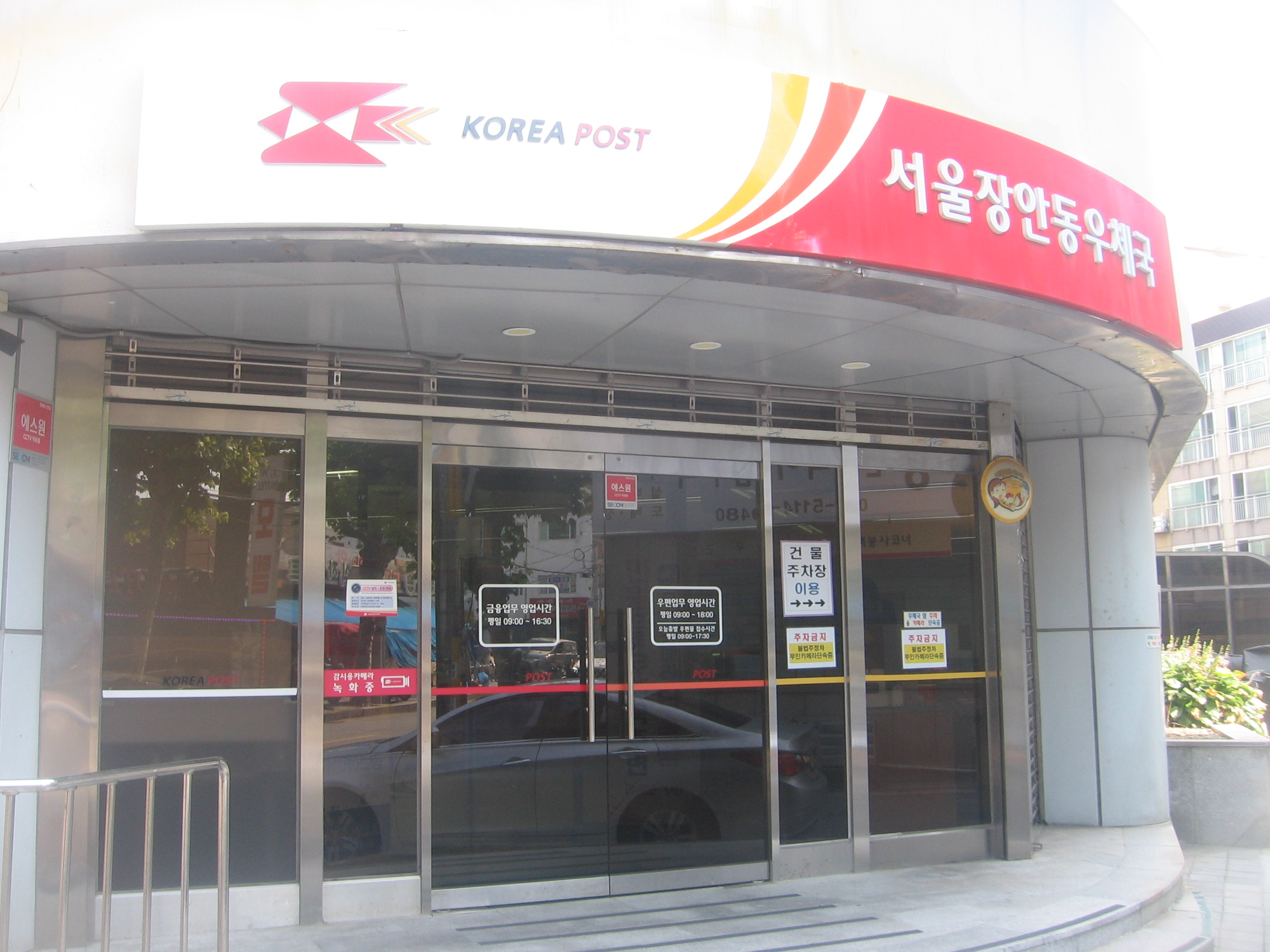
Korea Post Jangan-dong Post Office in Seoul, South Korea.

- Two divisions with four bureaus
- Affiliated agencies:
  - Korea Post Officials Training Institute
  - Korea Post Information Centre
  - Supply and Construction Office of Korea Post
  - Regional Communications Offices in Seoul, Gyeongin, Busan, Chungcheong, Jeonnam, Gyeongbuk, Jeongbuk, Kangwon, Jeju
  - 3,631 post offices
    - Incheon International Mail Centre
    - Busan International Mail Centre

== Investments ==
Korea Post invests in a wide variety of assets. In 2016, Korea Post invested in its first French property.

== See also ==
- Postage stamps and postal history of South Korea
- List of banks in South Korea
