= Postage stamps and postal history of North Korea =

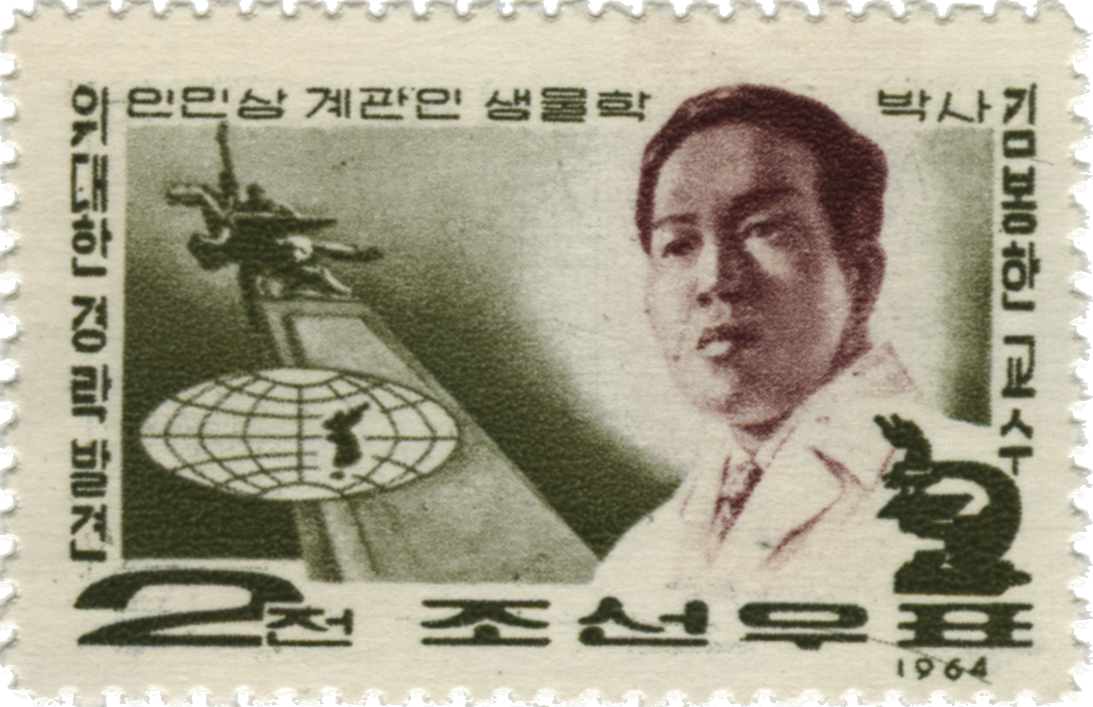
Kim Bong-han stamp issued in 1964

Postage stamps are issued by the Korea Stamp Corporation. North Korea issues copious amounts of stamps. Since the 1970s, the country has outproduced South Korea in terms of issuance. The stamps tend to portray patriotic and nationalist themes and are used as a form of propaganda, but some of them have little connection with the country. The country has been a member of the Fédération Internationale de Philatélie since 15 June 1965. There is a museum, the Korea Stamp Museum, dedicated to philately in the country.

== History ==
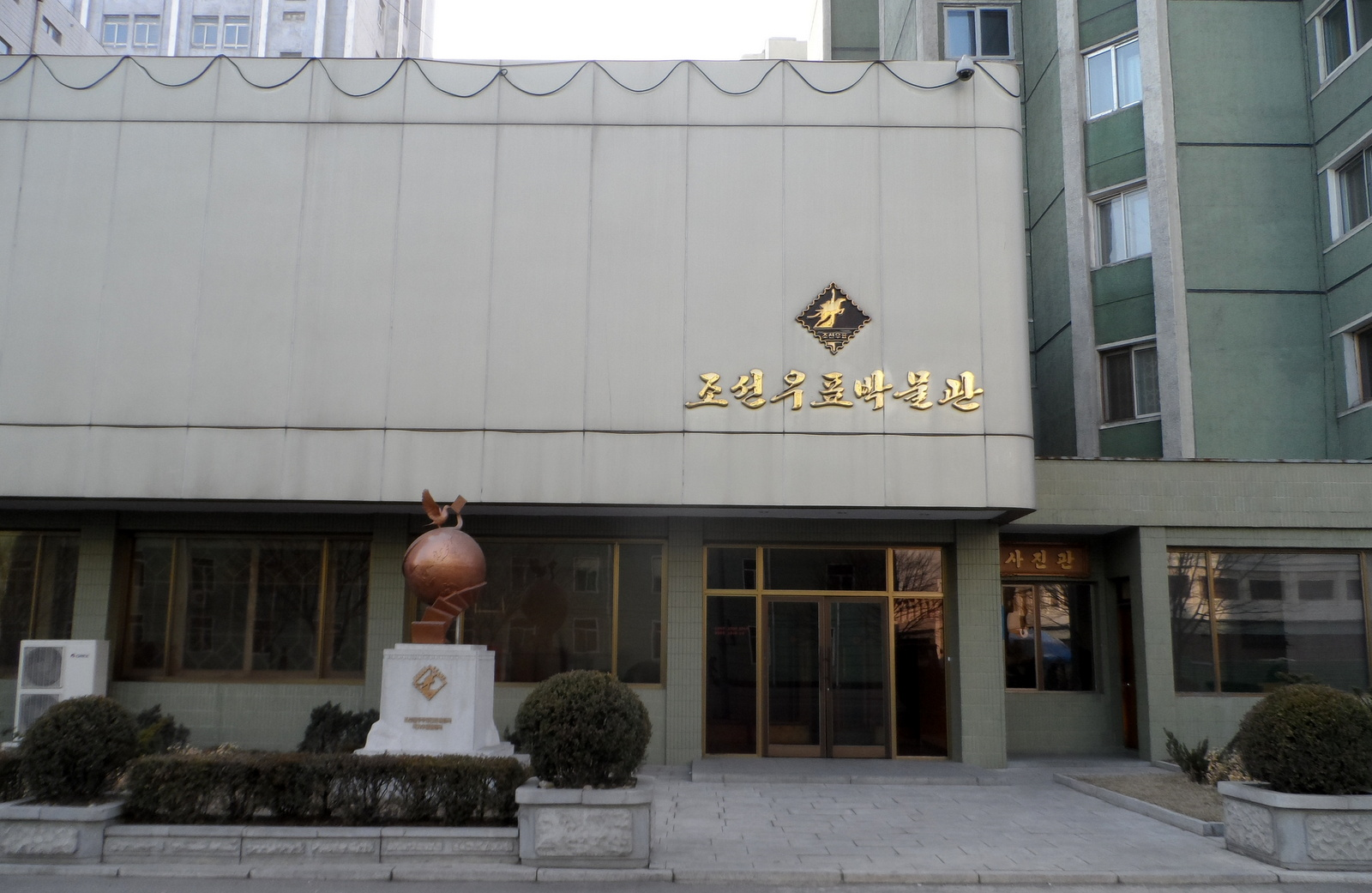
Korea Stamp shop in Pyongyang

The first stamps of North Korea were issued on 12 March 1946: Rose of Sharon and Samson Rock. Stamps prior to 1974 dealt primarily with subjects relating specifically to North Korea, its foundation, Kim Il Sung and other patriotic themes. After 1974, in a bid to bring more hard currency into the country, North Korea began issuing stamps with wide-ranging themes (such as Joan of Arc, airships, sports and wildlife) and using English descriptions.

Wording on the stamps is mostly in Korean. The term "DPR Korea" is written in English.

== See also ==
- North Korean Postal Service
- Postage stamps and postal history of South Korea
- Postage stamps and postal history of Korea
