= Korea Stamp Corporation =

Issuing authority of postage stamps in North Korea

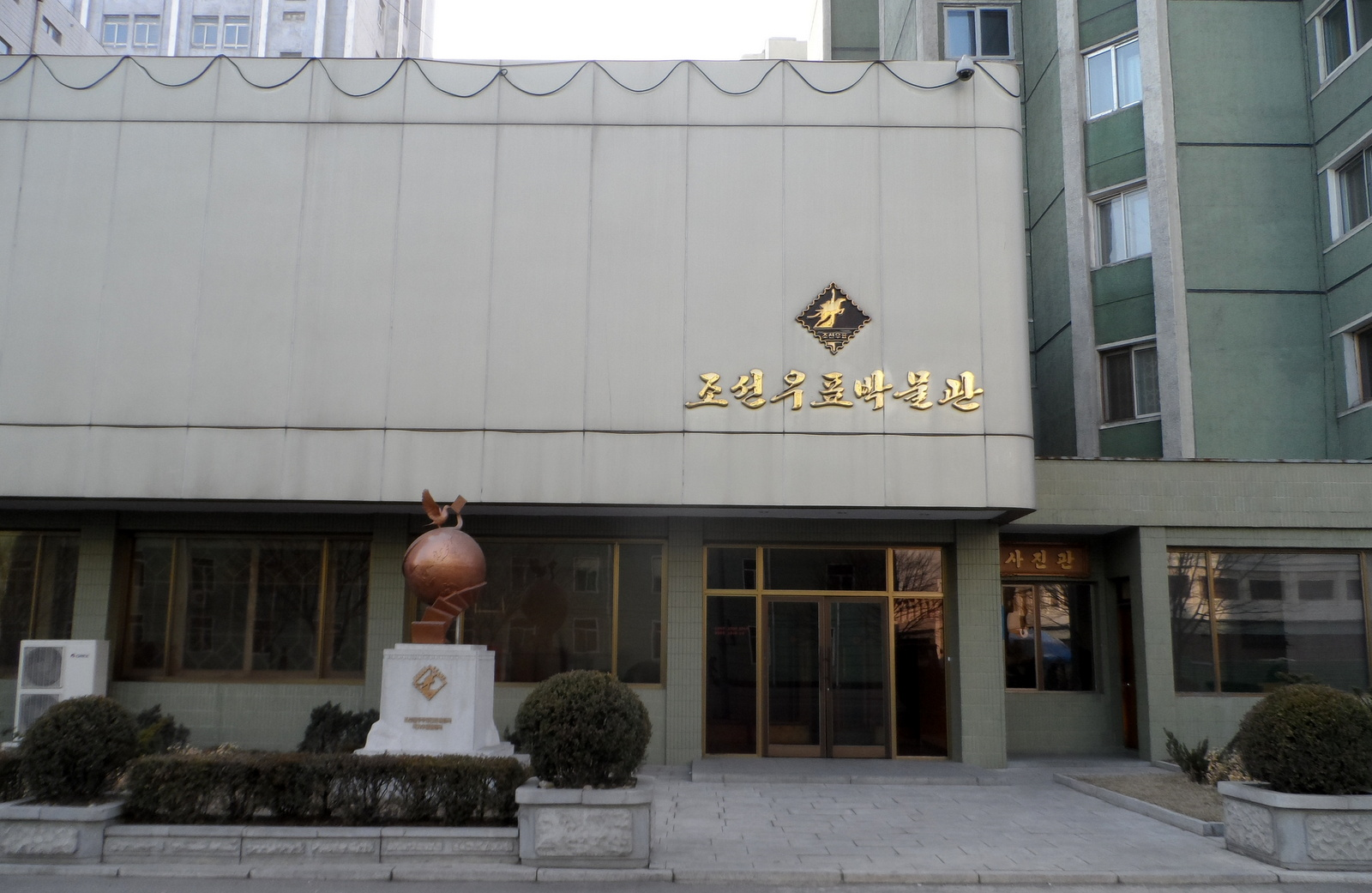
- Outside View of Pyongyang Stamp Shop
- Native name: 조선우표사
- Founded: 12 March 1946
- Headquarters: Yonggwang Street, Central District, Pyongyang, North Korea
- Number of locations: 3 offices (2026)
- Products: Stamps, First Day Covers and Postmark Cards
- Owner: Government of North Korea
- Website: www.korstamp.com.kp

The Korea Stamp Corporation (Korean: 조선우표사) is the issuing authority of postage stamps in North Korea. It is headquartered in the capital Pyongyang and has overseas offices in China (Beijing) and Russia (Moscow). It printed its first stamps on 12 March 1946. It had created over 7,200 stamp designs by March 2026.

In 2022, Lee Sang-hyun, a member of the South Korean Council for Reconciliation and Cooperation as well as a North Korean stamp expert, told Yonhap News Agency that "commemorative stamps bearing the portraits of the three supreme leaders and priced exorbitantly are limited to collectors, while it seems that only commemorative stamps used for regime propaganda (such as ordinary stamps or party founding badges) are used in mail." Yonhap News Agency believes that North Korea uses commemorative stamps for propaganda or to strengthen loyalty to the supreme leader, and also as a means of obtaining foreign exchange. Yonhap News Agency also cited a Kyodo News report as evidence that North Korea began requesting Japanese travel agencies to sell commemorative stamps worth 20,000 Japanese yen (approximately 220,000 Korean won) to Japanese citizens around August 2020.

In 2025, The Korea Times reported that the Corporation published a release notice for new stamps - for the first time - included Russian alongside English, Chinese, and Korean.

== See also ==
- Korea Stamp Museum
- Postage stamps and postal history of North Korea
- Wikibooks:International Postage Meter Stamp Catalog/Korea, Dem. Rep. (North)
- North Korean Postal Service
