= Postage stamps and postal history of South Korea =

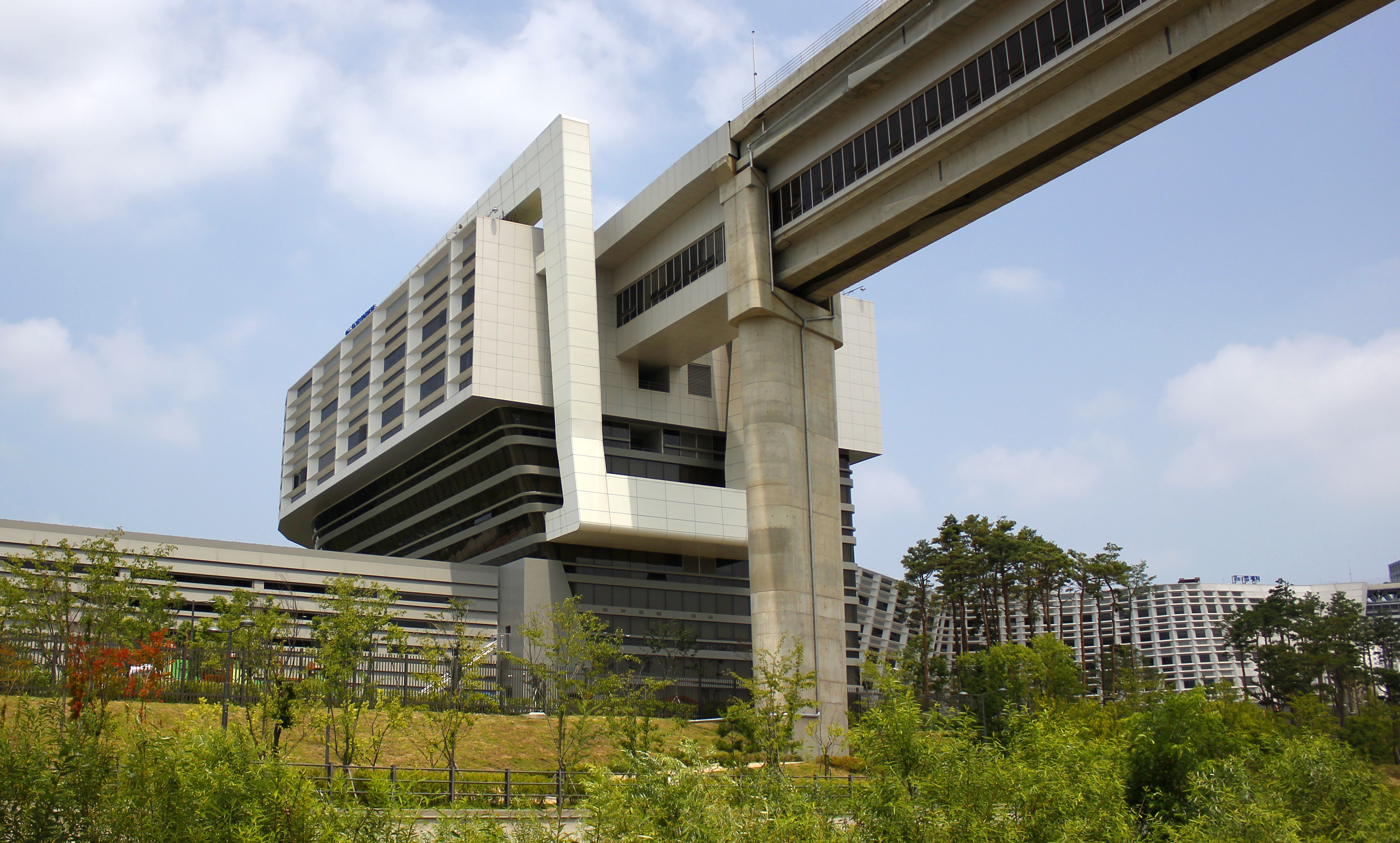
Korea Post headquarters in Sejong City, South Korea

This is a survey of the postage stamps and postal history of South Korea.

In 1945, Korea was liberated from Empire of Japan's colonial rule at the end of World War II, but soon divided into North and South Korea. South Korea began to issue its own stamps from 1946. Korea has been represented in the Universal Postal Union since 1900, and though Korea was under Japanese rule from 1910 to 1945, Korean membership was overseen by Allied military representatives after the World War II and resumed by South Korea on December 17, 1949.

Korea Post is a government agency responsible for providing postal service in the South Korea.

== Post–World War II ==
After the Surrender of Japan, United States Army Military Government in Korea was set up in the southern half of the Korean Peninsula. United States Armed Forces officers were assigned to military government jobs, and Lieutenant colonel William J. Herlihy was appointed director of the Bureau of Communications. In these years, the postal service was in turmoil that delivering posts and newspapers usually took nearly a month, and it was not until early 1947 that parcels were delivered restrictively. In the meanwhile, the cost of postage continued to rise. On August 12, 1946, the cost of postage was increased fivefold, and it doubled on April 1, 1947.

Since no stamps were available, the United States Army Military Government issued stamps on February 1, 1946, by temporarily overprinting former Japanese stamps. On May 1, the first commemorative stamps in South Korea were issued to celebrate the first anniversary of its independence. On August 15, a 50 chon stamp commemorating the first anniversary of the independence was also issued. On September 10, the United States Army Military Government issued definitive stamps with the name of "Joseon".

Issues of 1946

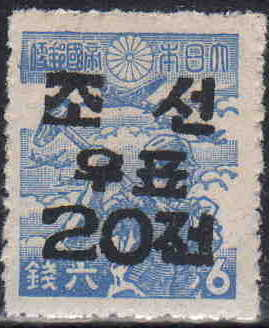
Japanese 6 sen stamp overprinted by United States Army Military Government in Korea, February 1946

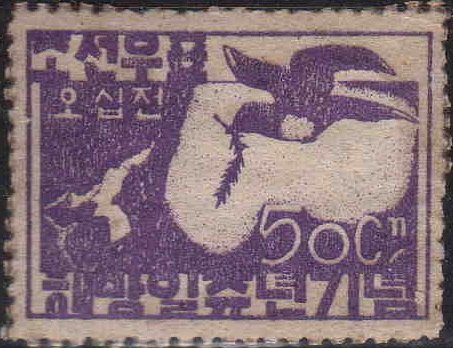
50 chon commemorative stamp, August 1946

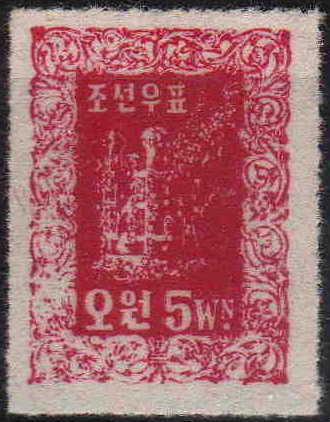
5 won definitive stamp, September 1946

On August 15, 1948, the government of South Korea was formally established. However, the name "Republic of Korea" already began to appear on August 1, on the commemorative stamp celebrating the promulgation of the Constitution of South Korea. A set of 15 definitive stamps were introduced with the name "Republic of Korea" from October 1. In this period, stamps were used as means of creating a nation and reifying national legitimacy. Stamps presented workers, farmers, national infrastructure, Korean Peninsula, census and national symbols such as Flag of South Korea or Hibiscus syriacus, the national flower of South Korea.

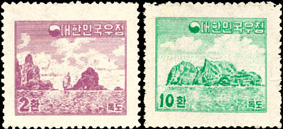
Liancourt Rocks, or Dokdo stamp of 1954

On September 15, 1954, a set of 3 stamps depicting Liancourt Rocks, or Dokdo (독도) in Korean language were issued. The Japanese government opposed South Korea's plan and stated that they would consider all posts with Liancourt Rocks stamps as prohibited goods. South Korean authorities responded that returning posts without proper reasons would be contravening regulations of Universal Postal Union. Eventually posts with Liancourt Rocks stamps were delivered within Japan after stamps were blackened or torn off. Korea Post again officially issued Liancourt Rocks stamps depicting flora and fauna of islets on January 16, 2004, as a part of the Islands of Korea Series. Japanese authorities stated that the issue violates the cooperative spirit of the Universal Postal Union, and Tarō Asō, then-Minister for Internal Affairs and Communications, mentioned about the issue of Japanese version of Liancourt Rocks stamp, or Takeshima stamp, which was not actualised.

== Modern era ==
During the military regime, stamps featuring Presidents of South Korea were frequently issued. When leaders of foreign countries visited South Korea or the President of South Korea visited foreign countries, commemorative stamps depicting flags or leaders' faces appeared. In this period, Park Chung-hee occurred 21 times and Chun Doo-hwan occurred 30 times.

On April 22, 1984, Korea Post issued stamps to commemorate the centenary of the postal service in South Korea. On January 3, 2000, a stamp commemorating the centennial of Korea's accession to the Universal Postal Union was issued.

On September 12, 2018, before the September 2018 inter-Korean summit, Korea Post issued a stamp depicting both leaders of North and South Korea, commemorating the previous April 2018 inter-Korean summit and 2018 North Korea–United States Singapore Summit. This was the first time in Korean postal history the North Korean leader appeared on a South Korean postage stamp.

== See also ==
- Postage stamps and postal history of Korea
- Postage stamps and postal history of North Korea

== Sources ==
- 김영희 (2008). 한국사회의 미디어 출현과 수용: 1880~1980 (in Korean). 커뮤니케이션북스. ISBN 9788984997219.
- 김정석 (2017). "'미군정하 과도기 우편사'의 역사적 의의". In 대한우표회 (ed.). 한국우표 130년 (in Korean). 연인M&B. pp. 10–102. ISBN 9788962532043.
- Lee, Hyesook (December 2018). "우표로 본 한국사회와 상징정치 — 해방부터 한국전쟁 시기까지를 중심으로" [Korean Society and Symbolic Politics of Postal Stamps: From Liberation to the End of Korean War]. 사회와역사 (in Korean). 120: 75–119.
