= RAF News =

UK-based military newspaper

- Type: Biweekly newspaper
- Format: Online and compact
- Publisher: Ministry of Defence (UK)
- Editor: Simon Williams
- News editor: Simon Mander
- Staff writers: Tracey Allen
- Headquarters: High Wycombe, United Kingdom
- ISSN: 0035-8614
- OCLC number: 474096693
- Website: http://www.rafnews.co.uk

The RAF News is the official newspaper of the United Kingdom's Royal Air Force.

Published every two weeks, the paper brings news, features on topical issues and life in the service, developments in military aviation and air power, reviews of significant events, and the history of the RAF. The paper is divided into smaller sections that cover news, cadets, veterans, obituaries, a bi-weekly feature, and a review section covering games, books, music, film, and TV titled "RnR".

== See also ==
- Navy News
