= Keijō Post Office =

Building in Seoul, Korea, 1915 – c. 1957

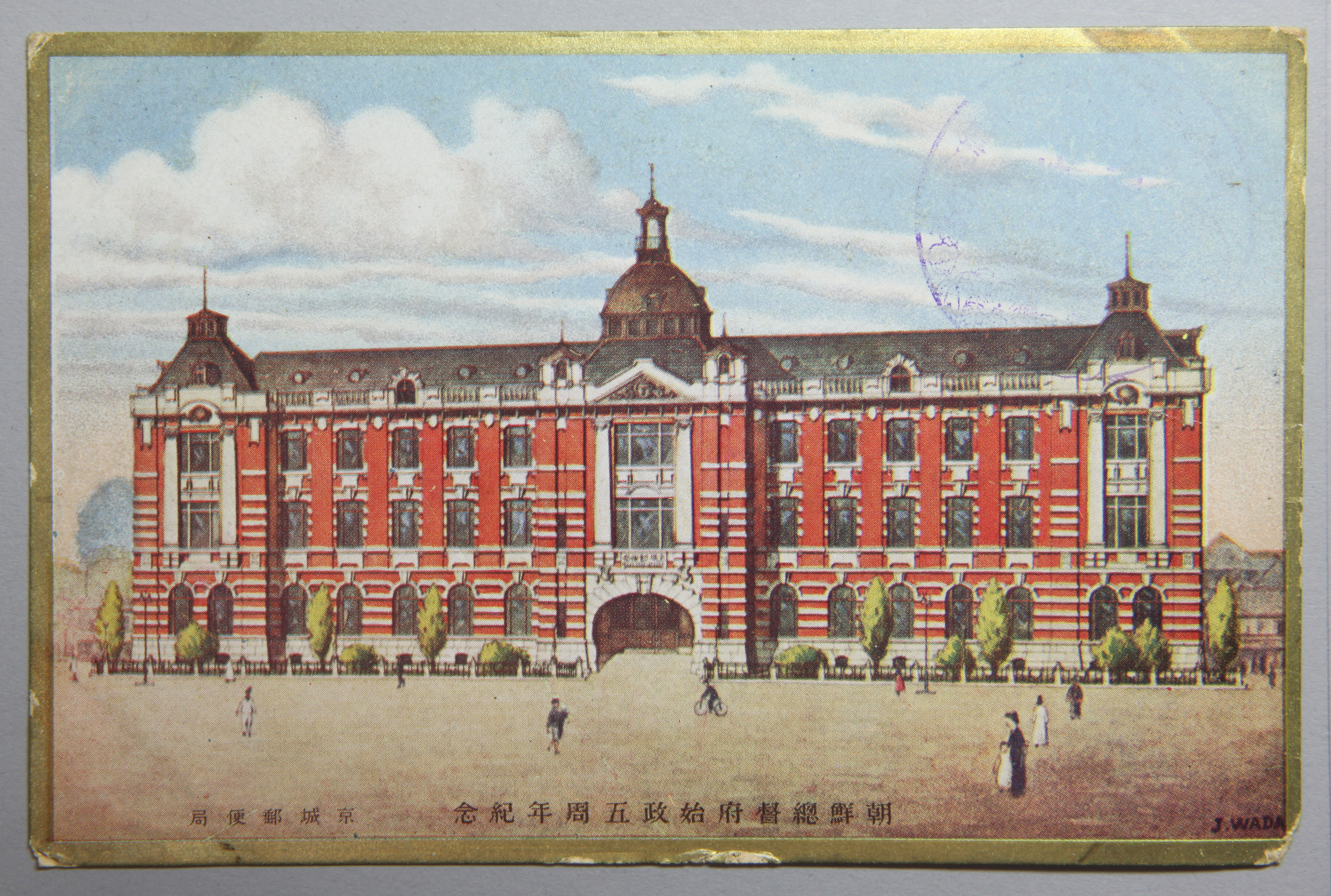
- Color postcard issued on the day of the office's opening (October 1, 1915)
- Interactive map of the Keijō Post Office area

General information
- Location: South Korea (Empire of Japan)
- Coordinates: 37.5615°N 126.9820°E
- Groundbreaking: October 23, 1913
- Completed: September 15, 1915
- Opened: October 1, 1915
- Demolished: 1957

Technical details
- Floor count: 4
- Floor area: 4,400 m^{2} (47,000 ft^{2})

Keijō Post Office (京城郵便局; Korean: 경성우편국) was a post office building in Seoul (Keijō), Korea from 1915 to 1957. It was primarily associated with the 1910–1945 Japanese colonial period in Korea, although it continued to be used by South Korea until its destruction. The building was inherited by the Seoul Central Post Office after the 1945 liberation of Korea, but was significantly damaged during the 1950–1953 Korean War. It was torn down and replaced with a different building around 1957. Seoul Central Post Office still operates on the location of this building today.

== Background ==
Korea developed its first modern postal system in the Joseon period. Hong Gye-hun, who visited the United States with the first ever Korean special diplomatic visit in 1883, began work on developing Korea's postal system after his return. However, he became embroiled in the Gapsin Coup in 1884, which delayed Korea's adoption of a postal system for several years. The post system finally came into effect after the Gabo Reform.

When Japan placed Korea under indirect rule in 1905, the Korean post office system was absorbed into the Japanese. When Japan formally annexed Korea in 1910, they reorganized the postal system, and constructed post office buildings and telegraph infrastructure throughout Korea. The Keijō Post Office was constructed as a part of these efforts, and was the largest and most prominent of such buildings.

== Description ==
Construction on the building began on October 23 1913, and it was completed on September 15 1915. It began operating on October 1, the anniversary of the Japanese Governor-General of Chōsen's establishment. Its designer is unknown. Its style has been described as British-influenced. It was a large brick building with a total floor area of 1,320 pyeong (4,400 m^{2}), with one underground and three above-ground floors. It had a large dome in the center of the building, with arches above its windows. It was located at what is today the intersection of Namdaemunno and Chungmu-ro. The building was very centrally located, with the Bank of Chōsen and a Mitsukoshi shopping mall (now Shinsegae) nearby.

The building played an important role in Korea, and served as a center for communication and finance. An article in the Maeil Business Newspaper wrote that the building served as an arm of economic and political exploitation over Korea.

It operated services for both post and telegraph for much of its history. In September 1939, after the telegraph service was split into a separately-managed service, the name of the building changed its name to Keijō Central Post Office (京城中央郵便局).

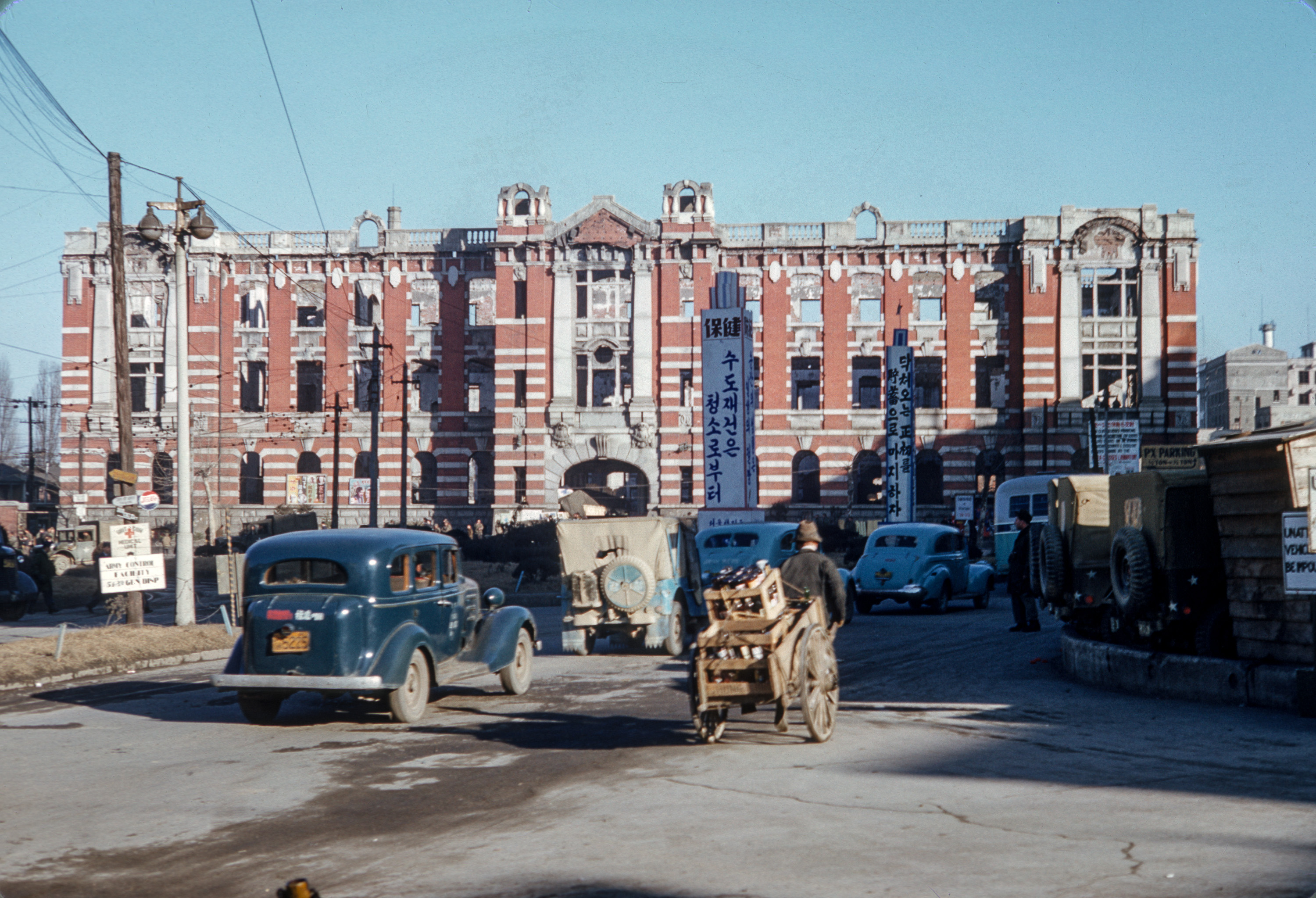
Visible damage to the building (particularly in the roof) from the Korean War (1954)

After the 1945 liberation of Korea, the Seoul Central Post Office inherited the building. The roof of the building was damaged by bombings in the 1950–1953 Korean War. The damaged building was eventually torn down, and in 1957 replaced by a plain three-story concrete building. That building was in turn replaced in the 1980s.

== See also ==
- Japanese post in Korea
- Postage stamps and postal history of Korea
