= Ministry of Post and Telecommunications (China) =

Ministry of Posts and Telecommunications
- 中国人民共和国邮电部
- Logo of the ministry

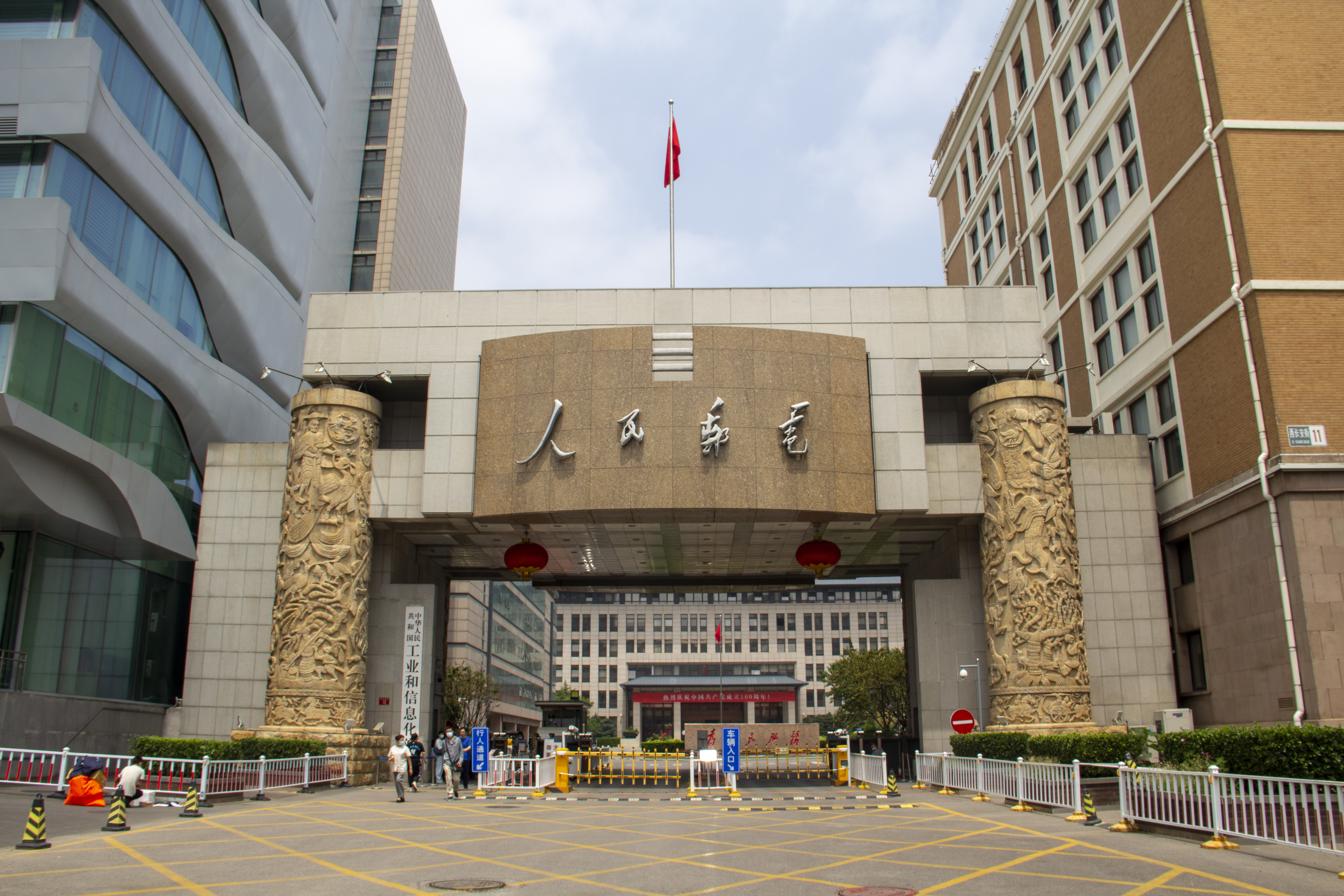
- The headquarters of the Ministry of Post and Telecommunications, No. 13 West Chang'an Street, is now the location of the Ministry of Industry and Information Technology, but it still bears the words "People's Posts and Telecommunications"

Agency overview
- Formed: November 1, 1949
- Dissolved: March 1, 1998
- Superseding agencies: Ministry of Industry and Information Technology; State Post Bureau
- Jurisdiction: China
- Headquarters: Beijing, China
- Parent agency: State Council of China

The Ministry of Posts and Telecommunications of the People's Republic of China (Chinese: 中国人民共和国邮电部) was a constituent department of the State Council of China that managed the postal and telecommunications of the People's Republic of China. It was abolished in 1998.

== History ==
On October 1, 1949, the Central People's Government of the People's Republic of China was established. On November 1, the Ministry of Posts and Telecommunications of the Central People's Government was formally established, with the responsibility of unified management of the postal and telecommunications of the People's Republic of China. Zhu Xuefan, a former postal worker was appointed as Minister and Wang Zheng as Vice Minister. The Ministry of Posts and Telecommunications established the General Postal Administration to manage the national postal work. In 1955 the Beijing Institute of Posts and Telecommunications was established which in 1957 reformed into the Institute of Posts and Telecommunications.

On November 5, 1969, during the Cultural Revolution, The State Council and the Central Military Commission forwarded the opinions of the Ministry of Railways, the Ministry of Communications, the Military Control Commission of the Ministry of Posts and Telecommunications, and the Ministry of Communications on the reform of the postal and telecommunications system, which separated the telecommunications and postal services of the Ministry of Posts and Telecommunications from the central to the grassroots level, and the telecommunications part was placed under the leadership of the military, and the postal part was merged with the transportation department. The postal service merged with the transportation department. The telecommunications department established a telecommunications bureau to manage telecommunications business, which was called the Telecommunications Bureau of the People's Republic of China for the convenience of external contacts; the postal department established a postal bureau to manage postal business.

On May 22, 1973 The State Council and the Central Military Commission issued the "Notice on the Adjustment of the Postal and Telecommunications System": The postal and telecommunications departments were again merged, and the Ministry of Posts and Telecommunications was restored, implementing a two-level postal and telecommunications management system of the central government and provinces, autonomous regions and municipalities directly under the central government. On June 1, the Ministry of Posts and Telecommunications was restored, and the postal and telecommunications departments were merged for the second time.

April 27, 1995 The Ministry of Posts and Telecommunications' General Telecommunications Administration officially registered its corporate legal person status, named "China Post and Telecommunications Administration" which was the predecessor of China Telecom, and the supervisory government functions were transferred to other departments within the Ministry of Posts and Telecommunications.

In March 1998, the first session of the 9th National People's Congress approved the State Council's institutional reform plan, establishing the Ministry of Information Industry on the basis of the Ministry of Post and Telecommunications and the Ministry of Electronics Industry, with the State Post Bureau as the national bureau under its management. The Ministry of Posts and Telecommunications was officially abolished, and its functions were taken over by the Ministry of Information Industry and the State Post Bureau. Later, the Ministry of Information Industry was merged into the Ministry of Industry and Information Technology.

== Organization ==
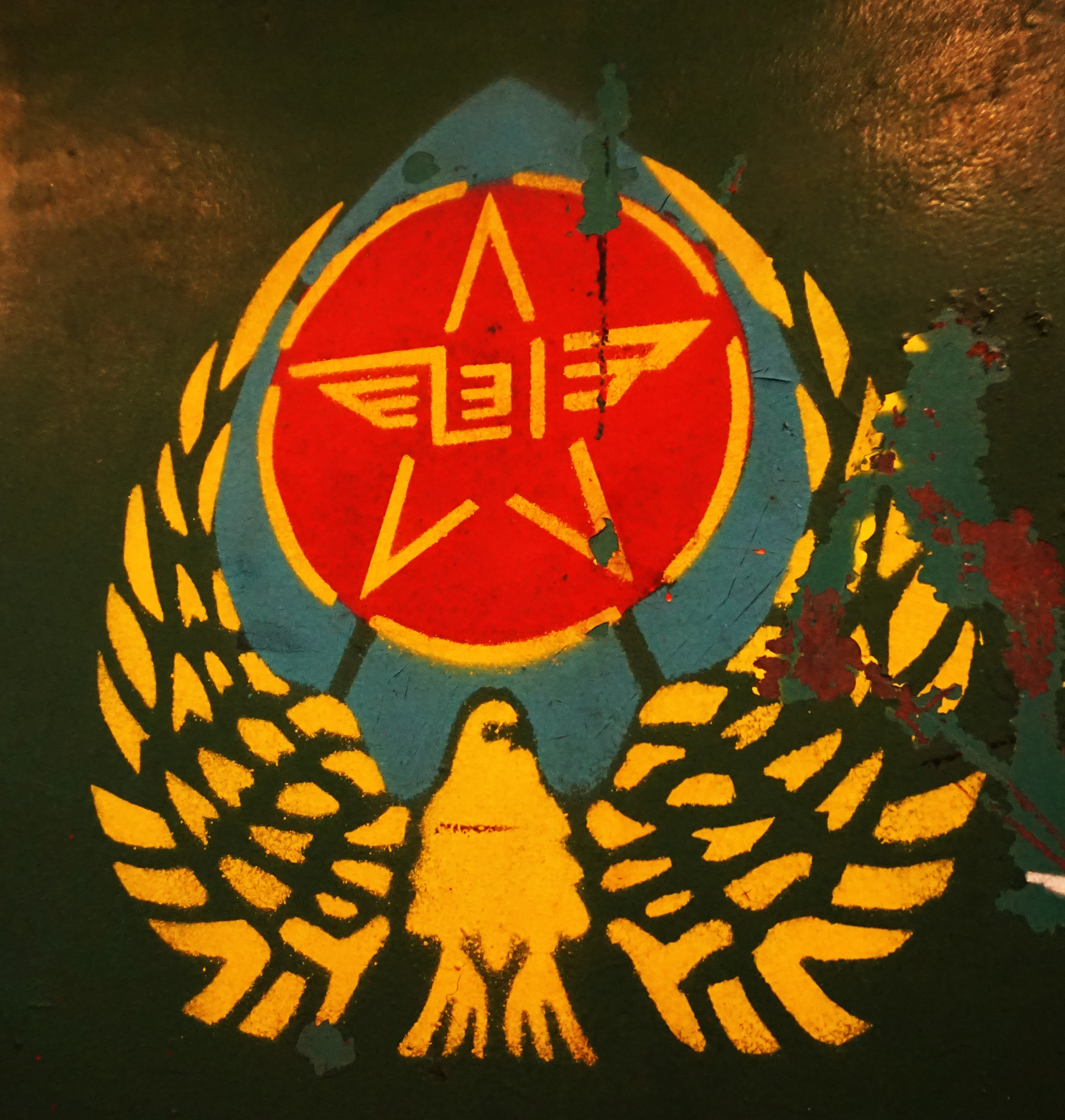
Postal emblem with wild geese used by the ministry

- General Hospital of Posts and Telecommunications under the Ministry of Posts and Telecommunications (later changed into The Xidan campus of Peking Union Medical College Hospital)
- General Office (Office, Minister's Office, News Office, General Office, Document Office, Archives Office, Letters and Visits Office, Confidentiality Office)
- Policy and Regulations Department (General Office, Regulations Office, System Reform Office, Taiwan Affairs Office, Reconsideration and Response Office)
- Personnel Department (General Office, Assessment and Appointment Office, Establishment and Allocation Office, Professional Personnel Office, Institutional Personnel Office)
- Labor and Wage Department (General Office, Labor Organization Office, Wage Office, Labor Insurance Office)
- Security and Protection Department (General Office, First Office, Second Office, Third Office)
- Administrative Department (Office, Planning and Finance Office, Capital Construction Office, General Management Office, Rehabilitation and Health Office, Housing and Assets Office, Reception Office)
- Education Department (General Office, School Education Office, Employee Education Office, Ideological Education Office)
- Communication Department (General Office, Telecommunications Office, Postal Office)
- Planning Department (General Planning Office , Planning Department, Introduction Planning Department, Statistics Department, Fixed Asset Investment Planning Department)
- Business and Finance Department (General Department, Business Department, Capital Asset Management Department, Infrastructure *Finance Department, Accounting Department)
- Science and Technology Department (General Department, Planning Department, Standards Department, Achievement Patent Department, International Cooperation Department)
- Capital Construction Department (General Department, Design and Construction Management Department, Engineering Supervision Department, Earthquake Resistance and Environmental Protection Office)
- Foreign Affairs Department (General Office, International Relations Department, International Postal Organization Department, International Telecommunication Organization Department, Economic and Technical Cooperation Department)
- General Post Office (Office, Inspection Room, Business Department, Domestic Business Department, International Business Department, Confidential Communications Department, Technology Department, Stamp Department)
- General Telecommunications Department (General Office, Business Department, Planning and Engineering Department, Domestic Communications Department, International Communications Department, Confidential Telecommunications Department, Rural Telephone Department, Mobile Communications Department, Radio Management Department, Wired Equipment Maintenance Department, Wireless Equipment Maintenance Department, Switching Equipment Maintenance Department, War Readiness Office)

== Ministers ==
- Zhu Xuefan (1949-1973)
- Zhong Fuxiang (1973-1978)
- Wang Zigang (1978-1981)
- Wen Minsheng (1981-1984)
- Yang Taifang (1984-1993)
- Wu Jichuan (1993-1998)
