= Cecogram =

Package containing items for visually impaired persons

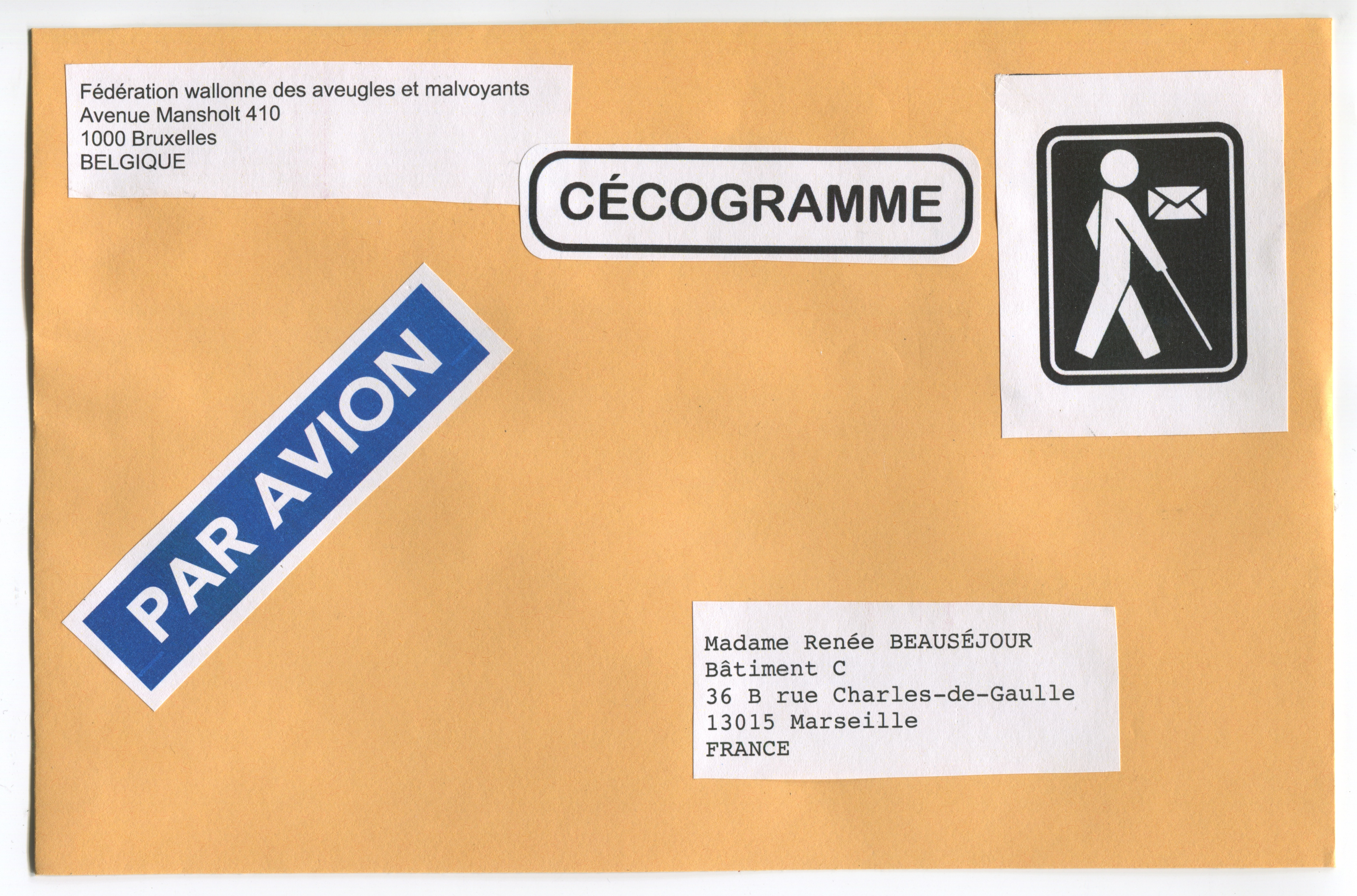
Cecograms do not require postage stamps.

A cecogram (/ˈsiː.koʊ.ɡræm/ SEE-koh-gram), also known as literature for the blind, is a letter or a parcel that contains documents or items intended for visually impaired persons. Cecograms can be sent or received by such persons, as well as by organisations that provide assistance to the visually impaired. Cecograms are either partially or entirely exempt from postage.

== Etymology ==
The word cecogram derives from the French cécogramme. Ultimately, the word originates from the Latin caecus (blind) and the Greek grámma (γράμμα; letter, thing written).

In English, other designations exist. The Universal Postal Union (UPU) uses the term "items for the blind" (formerly, "literature for the blind"), Royal Mail uses "articles for the blind", and the United States Postal Service uses "free matter for the blind".

== Origin ==
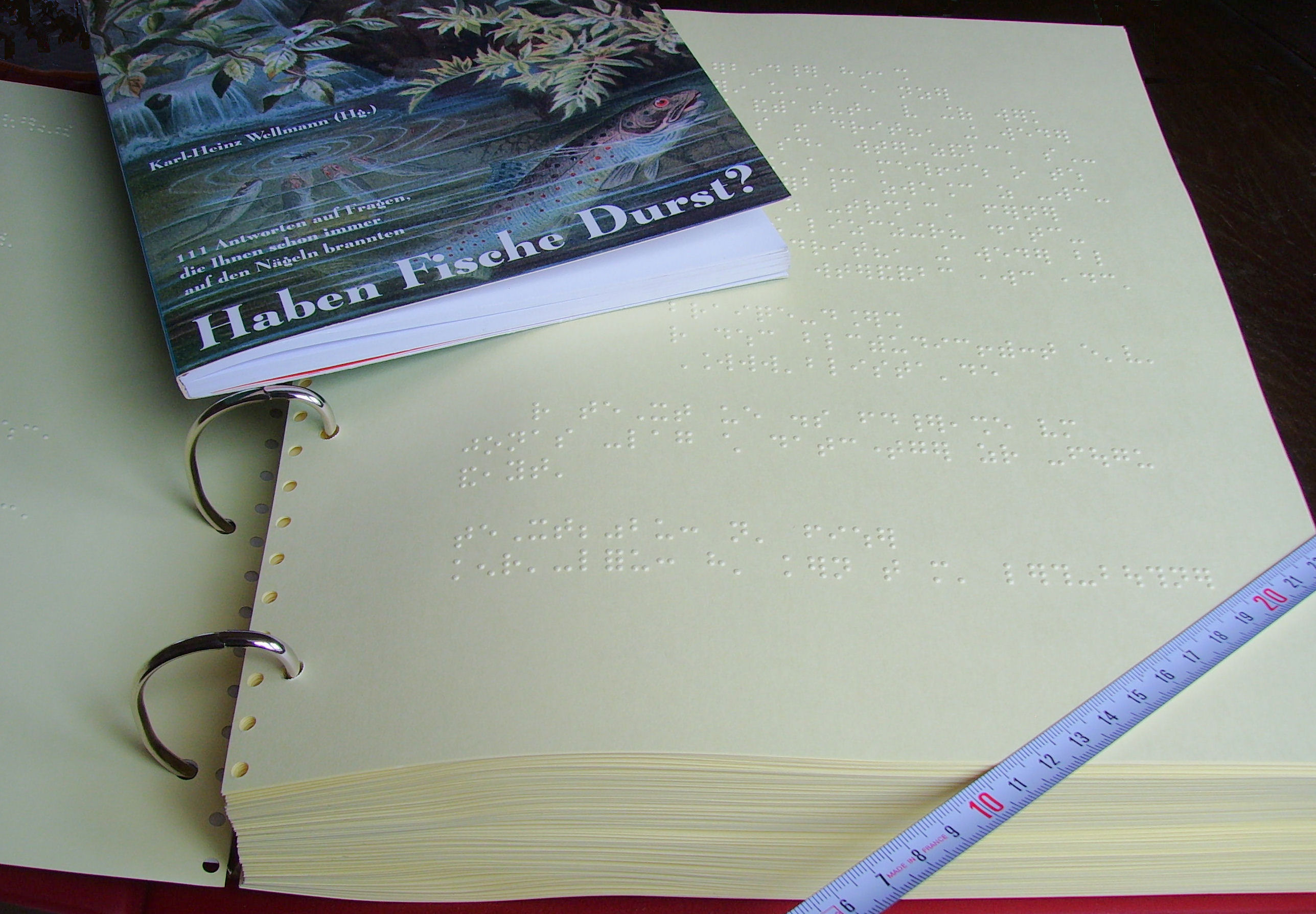
Braille books are much larger than books printed in ink. Pictured above are two versions of the same book; the bottom is printed in embossed braille characters, whilst the top uses Latin characters printed in ink.

In the 1800s, the advent of tactile writing systems, like braille and moon type, saw the visually impaired gain greater access to literature. In these writing systems, characters are represented by embossed symbols, known as tactile characters, that are read by passing one's fingertips over the paper.

Printing tactile characters requires paper formats larger and heavier than those used in ink printing. Posting books that use tactile characters is therefore more expensive. To offset the burden of this cost from visually impaired persons, many national postal services have established measures to allow books and other materials for the visually impaired to be posted free of charge. In 1898, Canada became one of the first nations to implement such measures through legislation.

In 1952, the UPU moved to exempt post containing documents printed in tactile characters for the visually impaired from postage. Henceforth, all member states of the United Nations have been bound to honour this exemption. The term cécogramme (cecogram) has been used by the UPU to designate such post officially since 1964.

== Regulation ==
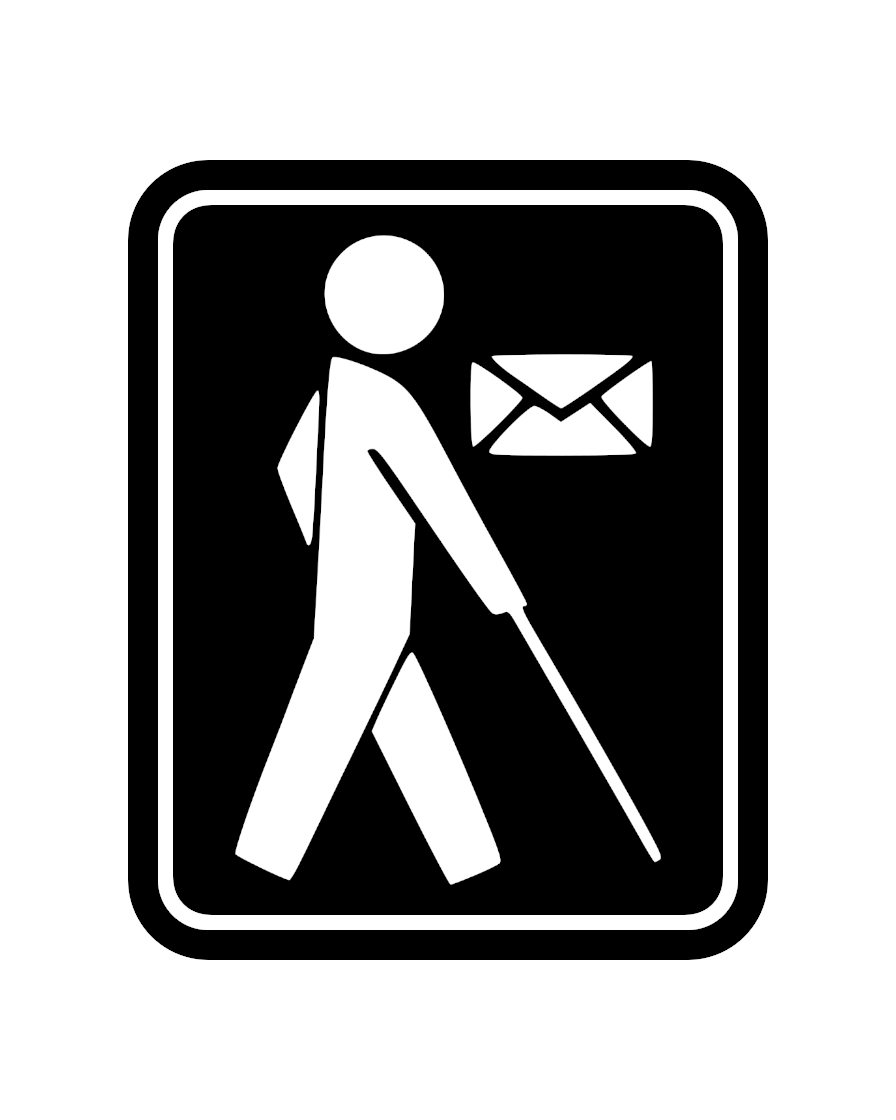
The internationally recognised cecogram label should be adhered to all cecograms.

The Universal Postal Union officially defines what constitutes a cecogram on behalf of the international community.

Modern cecograms may contain documents in paper and digital formats. These include texts printed with tactile characters, tactile graphics, audio CDs, flash drives and hard drives. Other items designed to assist persons dealing with challenges inherent to visual impairment, such as white canes and braille watches, may also be included in cecograms.

Unlike ordinary letters and parcels, cecograms should be easy to open and close. The contents of cecograms are routinely inspected by postal workers in order to ensure that senders are not abusing the cecogram's exemption from postage. Including items in cecograms other than those expressly created for the visually impaired is prohibited. Cecograms may weigh up to 7 kilograms (15 lb; 1 st 1 lb).

The international cecogram symbol, a white-on-black pictogram depicting a person using a white cane, should be placed on the exterior of any cecogram. It should measure 52 by 65 millimetres (2 1/16 in × 2 9/16 in). Furthermore, it should be indicated in writing on the exterior that the letter or parcel is indeed a cecogram.

In order to enable communication between sighted and visually impaired persons, it is now possible to send cecograms online. Through a web form, the sender enters the address of the recipient and a message. The message is then printed in braille and posted. This service, like any other cecogram service, is normally free of charge.

== See also ==
- Air mail
- Franchise stamp
- Free frank
- Freepost
- Postal censorship
- Semi-postal stamp
