= Wedding dress of Princess Louise =

Wedding dress of Princess Louise may refer to:

- Wedding dress of Princess Louise of the United Kingdom
- Wedding dress of Princess Louise of Wales
- Wedding dress of Princess Louise Margaret of Prussia
