= Yellow Valentino dress of Cate Blanchett =

Dress worn to the 77th Academy Awards in 2005

- Designer: Valentino
- Year: 2005
- Type: Yellow taffeta dress
- Material: Silk

Australian actress Cate Blanchett wore a pale yellow silk taffeta Valentino dress to the 77th Academy Awards on 26 February 2005. It was the dress Blanchett wore when she won the Academy Award for Best Supporting Actress for her performance in The Aviator in front of some 42.1 million people on American television. Cosmopolitan has cited the gown as one of the Best Oscar dresses of all time, stating, "In this yellow silk taffeta gown created especially for her by Valentino, Cate looks like a classic Hollywood starlet. The one-shoulder strap and contrasting belt are great details, and the color is perfect for her milk-white skin."

== Features and influences ==
The dress worn by Blanchett was a long silk taffeta strapless gown, with embroidery on the left shoulder and a satin burgundy bow sash. The yellow colour of the dress was intended to be a "special yellow" colour according to Valentino in a March 2005 interview with People magazine. He stated that his intention was to achieve the feeling of serenity when looking at Cate's dress, the look of a modern goddess. Although yellow was considered to be the "in" colour for 2005, according to Valentino in a 2006 interview, his motivation for designing dresses is not what the trends are but a genuine desire to create "sexy, feminine pieces that enhance a woman's beauty and accentuate her best features."

According to Karen Kay, the fashion correspondent for Sky News, the dress and others at the ceremony represented the fashion of old-school 30s Hollywood, which she believed was "probably inspired a little bit by "The Aviator", leading it to be a "vintage year for fashion". The Washington Post likened Blanchett's yellow dress to vintage 1940s Norman Norell dresses on display at the Fabulous! Fashions of the Terrace Gallery at the Kennedy Center.

== Reception ==
"I already knew I wanted to wear Valentino--I wanted something with a classicism to it, and he's the master of that. I'd seen a dress in yellow. I loved it; I thought it was really striking. And when I tried it on, the sun was beaming through the windows, and the fabric was shot through with a pink and blue. Because the Oscars start out as a daytime event, I thought it would be amazing in the sunlight."

— Blanchett on her decision to wear yellow Valentino.

As a result of wearing the dress, Blanchett topped many of the year's best-dressed lists. Vogue cited the dress as one of the fashion highlights of the year, a "custom butter-yellow Valentino" in which she picked up Best Supporting Actress for The Aviator. Fashion writer Ellie Levenson, writing for the BBC, remarked that Blanchett was "impeccably dressed in yellow Valentino couture." The Charleston Gazette said that Blanchett's arrival in the dress was the most replayed red-carpet moment of the Academy Awards of that year.

However, although yellow was a popular colour in 2005 summer fashion, and Cosmopolitan cited the dress as among the best Oscar dresses of all time, fashion critics were divided on the dress. Lesley Kennedy of the Rocky Mountain News considered the 2005 Oscars to be a "giant fashion runway". She noted that many actresses attending the ceremony opted for strapless gowns, and said that unlike Beyoncé, Scarlett Johansson, Kirsten Dunst, Drew Barrymore and Annette Bening who wore black, the "usually spot-on Cate Blanchett (in Valentino) looked a little bit like a bruised banana in her yellow and burgundy-brown dress." Kennedy believed that Blanchett was outshone by Renée Zellweger wearing Carolina Herrera. Blanchett later wore a Silver Giorgio Armani dress at the 2007 Oscars and in 2013 made a deal with Armani to sell their perfumes for a reported $10 million.

== Adaptations and retrospect ==
Designers such as ABS by Allen Schwartz selected Blanchett's dress as one of six designs for his adaptations, which included "Cate Blanchett's yellow, one-shouldered look (Valentino), Charlize Theron's strapless aqua blue gown with tiered netting (Dior Couture by John Galliano), Portman's Grecian number (Lanvin), Halle Berry's one-shouldered, champagne-colored gown (Atelier Versace), Rossum's strapless dress (Ralph Lauren) and Gwyneth Paltrow's pale pink strapless gown (Stella McCartney)." The replicas, although without the trains and slightly toned down, were made in a range of fabrics such as satin, velvet and taffeta and were sold for $150–200 in stores in the summer of 2005. Valentino showcased the yellow dress with the burgundy sash among nearly 300 couture dresses at the retrospective exhibition Valentino in Rome: 45 Years of Style in July 2007.

== See also ==
- List of individual dresses
