= Wedding dress of Princess Alice =

Wedding dress of Princess Alice may refer to:

- Wedding dress of Princess Alice of the United Kingdom
- Wedding dress of Lady Alice Montagu Douglas Scott, later known as Princess Alice, Duchess of Gloucester
