= List of individual dresses =

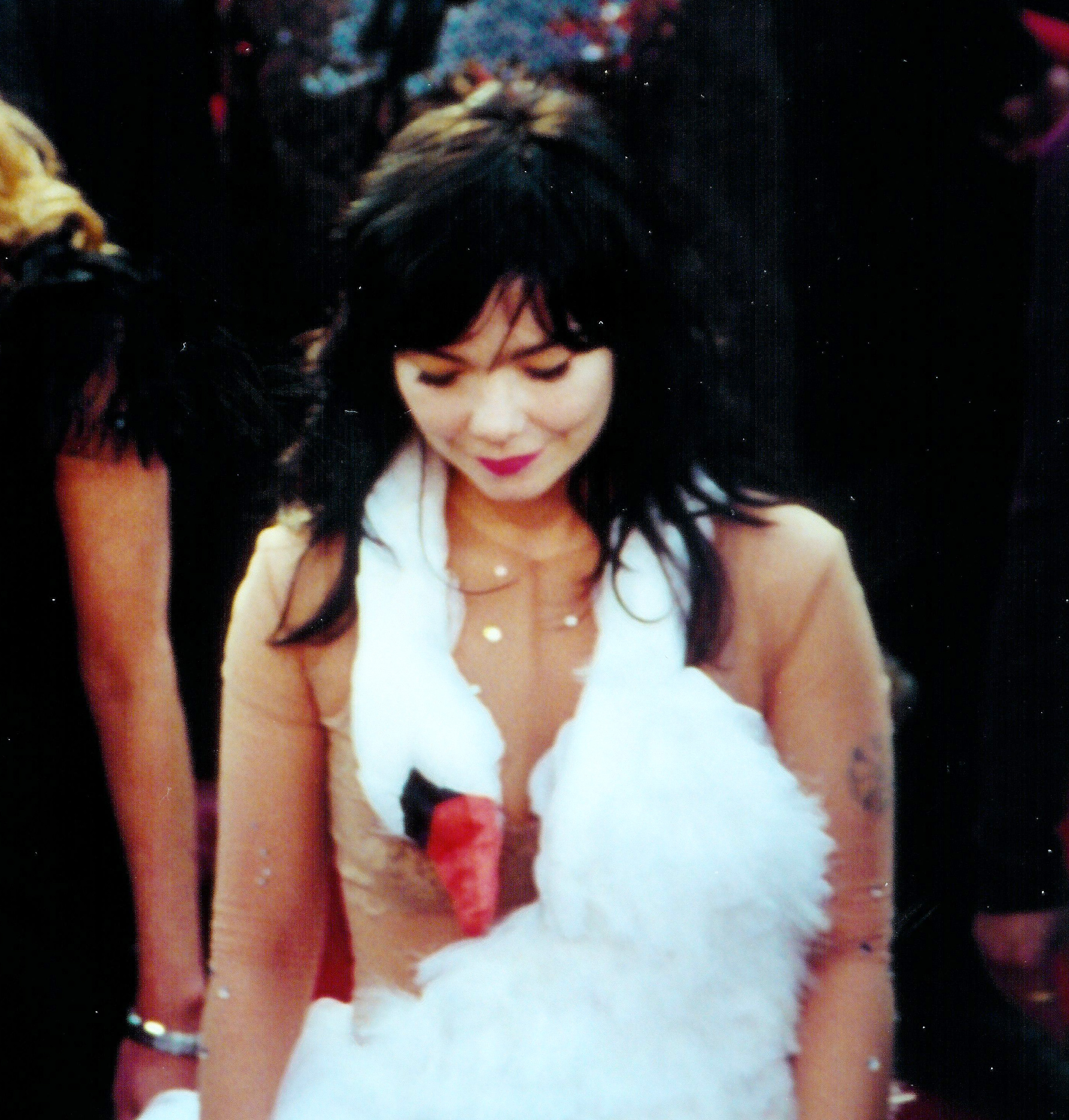
Björk wearing the swan dress designed by Marjan Pejoski at the Academy Awards in 2001

This is a list of individual dresses that are notable for their historical significance, appearances in media, or as art.

== Historical dresses ==
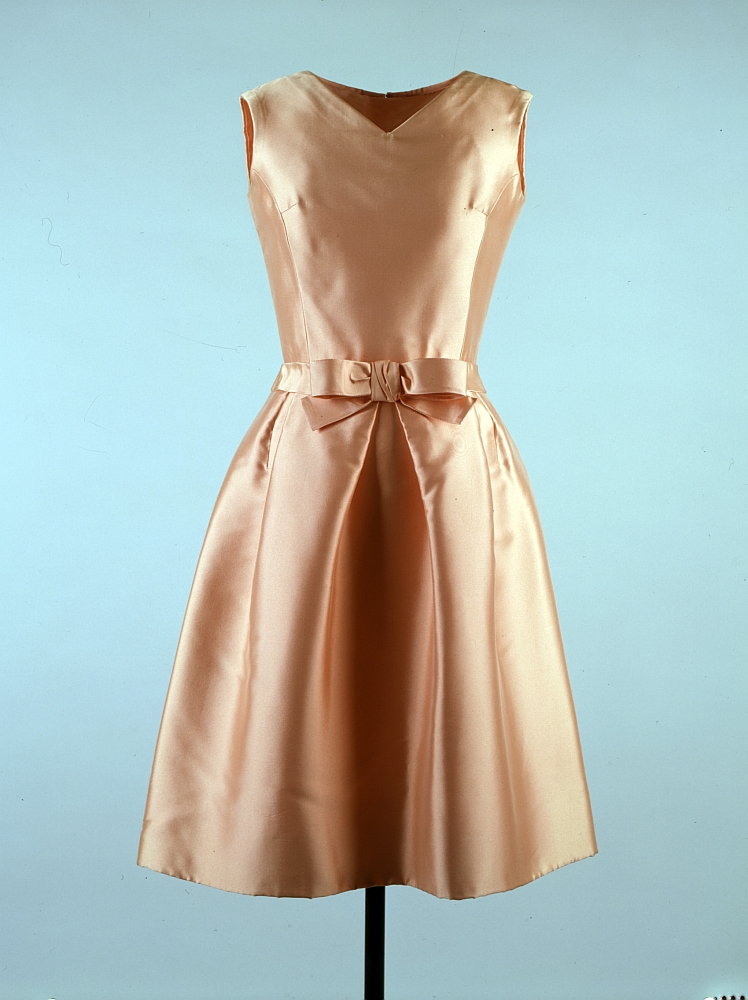
Apricot dress worn by Jacqueline Kennedy during a visit to India

- Apricot dress of Jacqueline Kennedy, designed by Oleg Cassini and worn by U.S. First Lady Jacqueline Kennedy on her 1962 goodwill tour of India
- Bacton Altar Cloth, the only surviving dress of Queen Elizabeth I; so-named because it had been used as an altar cloth for centuries before being rediscovered
- Blue and green cotton shift dress of Jacqueline Kennedy, designed by Joan "Tiger" Morse and worn by U.S. First Lady Jacqueline Kennedy on her 1962 goodwill tour of India
- Cream Dior dress of Princess Margaret, worn for her 21st birthday commemorations in 1951
- Cyclone, a 1939 evening dress by grand couturier Jeanne Lanvin
- Electric Light dress, a masquerade gown designed for Alice Vanderbilt in 1883 featuring a battery-powered electric bulb
- Kimberley Hall Mantua, the earliest complete European women's costume at the Metropolitan Museum of Art
- Lady Curzon's peacock dress, worn by Baroness Mary Curzon to celebrate the 1902 coronation of King Edward VII and Queen Alexandra
- Lobster dress, a dress designed by Elsa Schiaparelli featuring a lobster painted by Salvador Dalí
- Monica Lewinsky's dress, a key piece of evidence during the Clinton–Lewinsky scandal
- Oyster dress, designed by Alexander McQueen
- Pink Chanel suit of Jacqueline Bouvier Kennedy, worn during the 1963 assassination of her husband
- Revenge dress, a black dress worn by Diana, Princess of Wales following the revelation that her husband had been unfaithful
- Tarkhan dress, a 5000-year old linen dress considered the known oldest woven garment
- Travolta dress, a midnight blue gown worn by Diana and named for John Travolta, with whom she danced while wearing it

== Worn by celebrities ==
=== In film, television, and performance ===
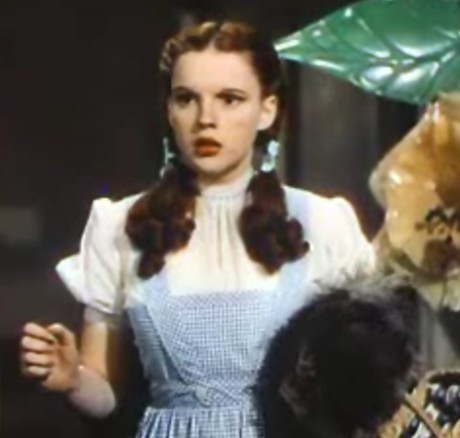
Judy Garland wearing a gingham dress in a trailer for The Wizard of Oz

- Black dress of Rita Hayworth, worn in the 1946 film Gilda
- Black Givenchy dress of Audrey Hepburn, worn in the 1961 film Breakfast at Tiffany's
- Curtain dress, created by Bob Mackie and worn by Carol Burnett during the "Went with the Wind!" sketch on her variety show
- Gingham dress of Judy Garland, worn in the 1939 film The Wizard of Oz
- Green dress of Keira Knightley, worn in the 2007 film Atonement
- Happy Birthday, Mr. President dress, worn by Marilyn Monroe at a gala celebrating President John F. Kennedy's 45th birthday
- Letty Lynton dress, worn in the 1932 film Letty Lynton, created by Adrian and worn by Joan Crawford
- Mayon gown, worn by Catriona Gray during the evening gown competition in Miss Universe 2018
- Meat dress of Lady Gaga, worn at the 2010 MTV Video Music Awards
- Pink dress of Marilyn Monroe, worn in the 1953 film Gentlemen Prefer Blondes
- Red dress of Julia Roberts, worn in the 1990 film Pretty Woman
- Union Jack dress, worn by Geri Halliwell (Spice Girls) at the Brit Awards 1997
- White dress of Marilyn Monroe, worn in the 1955 film The Seven Year Itch

=== Red carpet and other public appearances ===
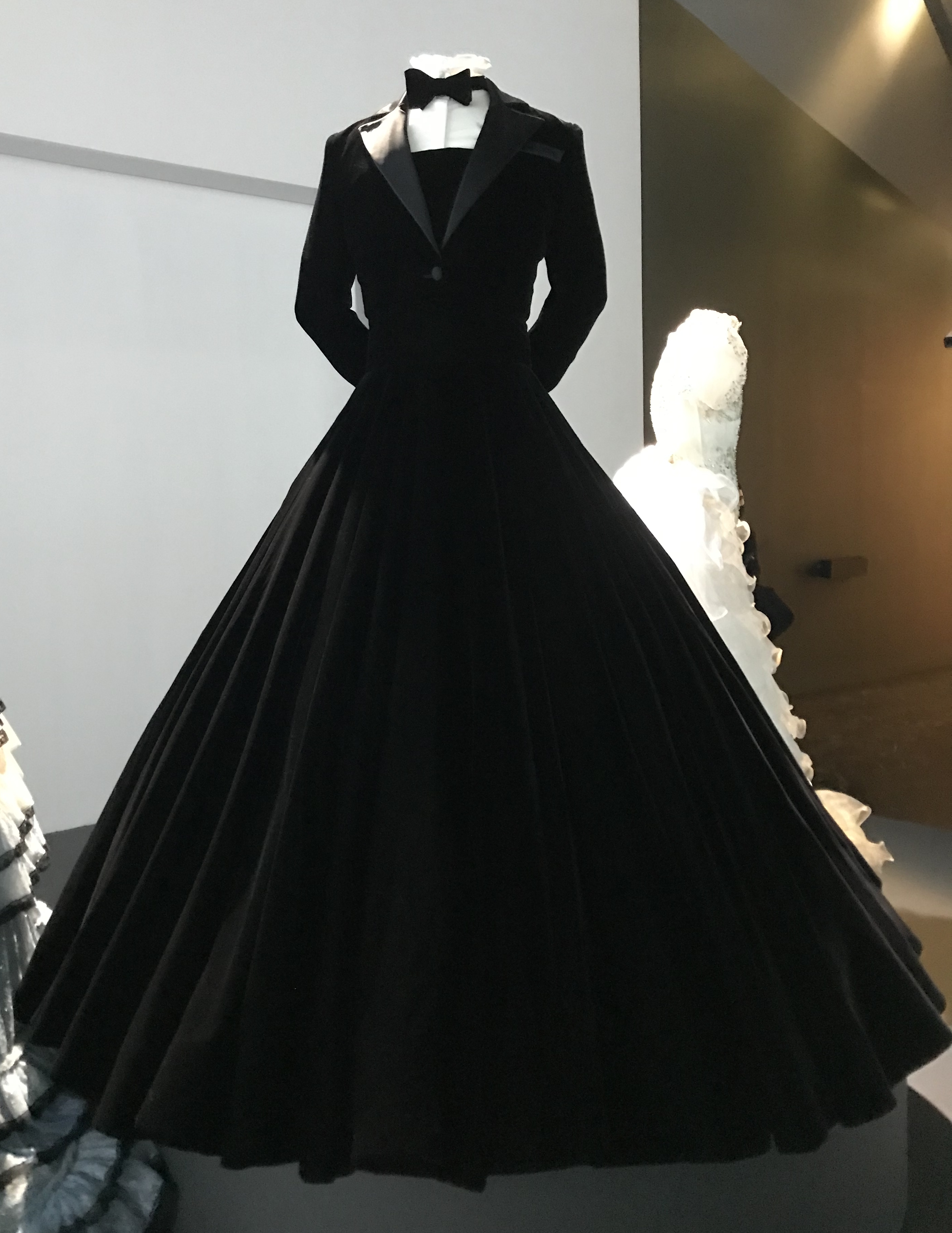
The black Christian Siriano gown made famous by Billy Porter, pictured at Fashioning Masculinities: The Art of Menswear, Victoria and Albert Museum, March 2022

- American Express Gold card dress of Lizzy Gardiner
- Black Christian Siriano gown of Billy Porter
- Black Versace dress of Angelina Jolie
- Black Versace dress of Elizabeth Hurley
- Black and white Valentino dress of Julia Roberts
- Blue Gucci dress of Harry Styles
- Blue Prada dress of Lupita Nyong'o
- Chartreuse Dior dress of Nicole Kidman
- Crimson Alberta Ferretti dress of Uma Thurman
- Elie Saab net dress of Halle Berry
- Green Versace dress of Jennifer Lopez
- Ivory Jean Paul Gaultier dress of Marion Cotillard
- Lavender Prada dress of Uma Thurman
- Navy blue Guy Laroche dress of Hilary Swank
- Omelette dress, worn by Rihanna
- Pink feathered Versace dress of Penélope Cruz
- Pink Ralph Lauren dress of Gwyneth Paltrow
- Plum Vera Wang dress of Keira Knightley
- Red Ben de Lisi dress of Kate Winslet
- Red Tarvydas dress of Rebecca Twigley
- Red Versace dress of Cindy Crawford
- Saffron Vera Wang dress of Michelle Williams
- Silver Julien Macdonald dress of Paris Hilton
- Swan dress, worn by Björk
- Swarovski crystal mesh Armani Privé gown
- White floral Givenchy dress of Audrey Hepburn
- White Marc Bouwer dress of Angelina Jolie
- White shift dress of Jean Shrimpton
- Yellow Valentino dress of Cate Blanchett

== Coronation, wedding, and engagement dresses ==
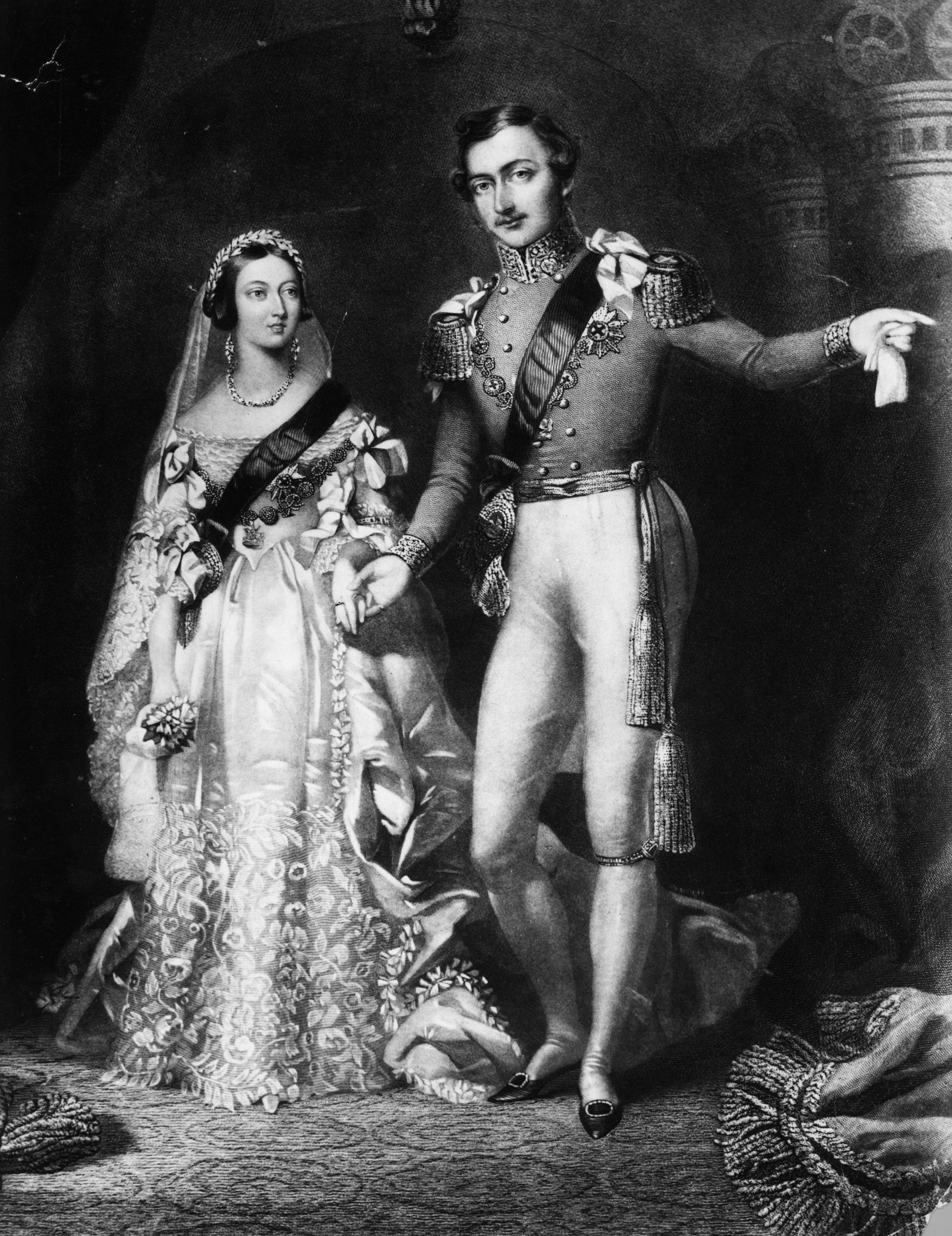
Queen Victoria (on the left) wearing her wedding dress

- Coronation gown of Elizabeth II
- Engagement dress of Catherine Middleton
- Wedding dress of Princess Alexandra of Denmark
- Wedding dress of Princess Alice of the United Kingdom
- Wedding dresses of Princess Anne of the United Kingdom
- Wedding dress of Princess Beatrice of the United Kingdom
- Wedding dress of Princess Beatrice of York
- Wedding dress of Carolyn Bessette
- Wedding dress of Jacqueline Bouvier
- Wedding dress of Princess Charlotte of Wales
- Wedding dress of Princess Elizabeth of the United Kingdom
- Wedding dress of Princess Eugenie of York
- Wedding dress of Sarah Ferguson
- Wedding dress of Princess Helena of the United Kingdom
- Wedding dress of Princess Helen of Waldeck and Pyrmont
- Wedding dress of Grace Kelly
- Wedding dress of Princess Louise of the United Kingdom
- Wedding dress of Princess Louise of Wales
- Wedding dress of Princess Louise Margaret of Prussia
- Wedding dress of Princess Margaret of the United Kingdom
- Wedding dress of Meghan Markle
- Wedding dress of Princess Victoria Mary of Teck
- Wedding dress of Princess Maud of Wales
- Wedding dress of Catherine Middleton
- Wedding dress of Camilla Parker Bowles
- Wedding dress of Sophie Rhys-Jones
- Wedding dress of Wallis Simpson
- Wedding dress of Lady Diana Spencer
- Wedding dress of Queen Victoria
- Wedding dress of Victoria, Princess Royal

== Dresses as art ==
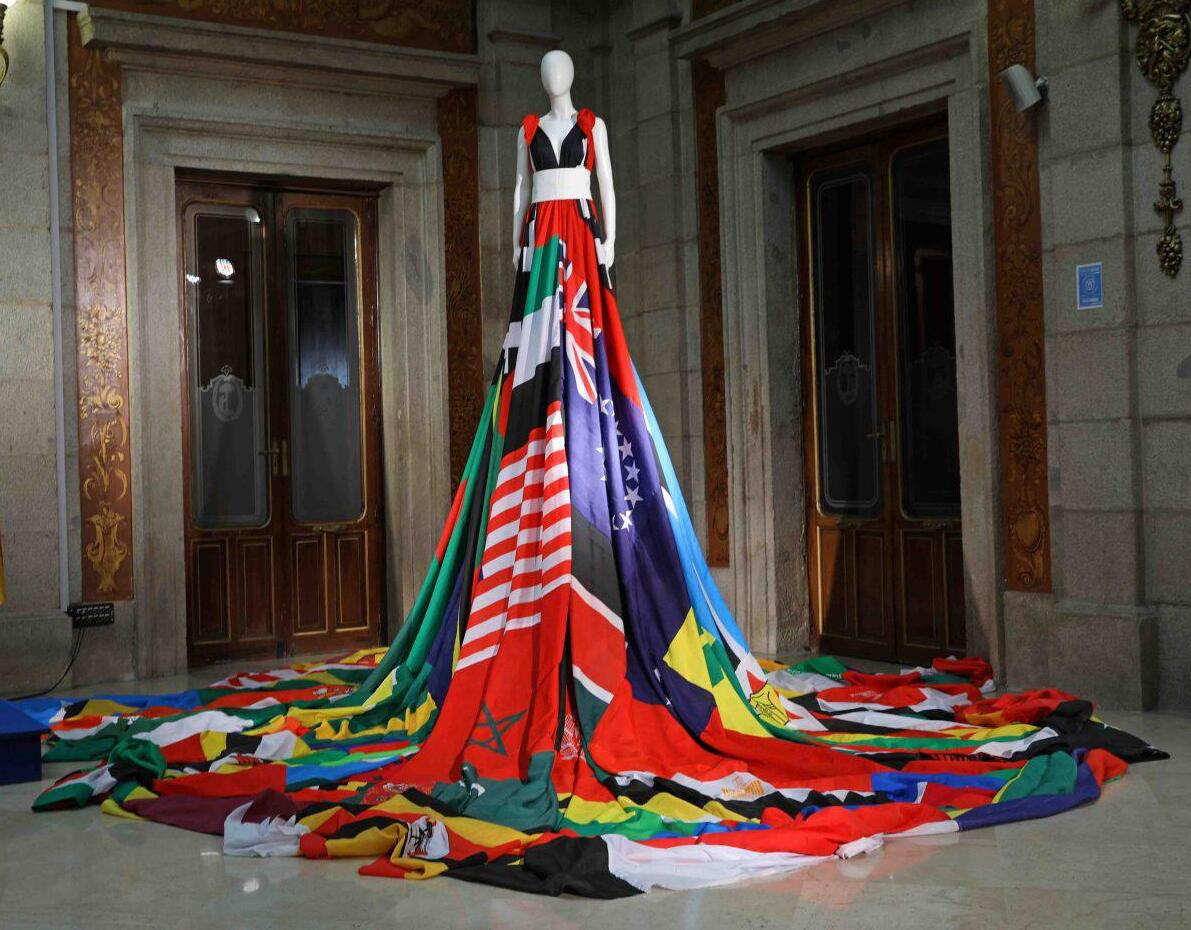
The Amsterdam Rainbow Dress in Madrid in 2018

- Amsterdam Rainbow Dress, dress made of more than 70 flags of nations where homosexuality is illegal
- Berry Dress, a 1994 mixed-media sculpture by Alice Maher
- Climate Dress, embedded with LEDs that change color in reaction to carbon dioxide in the air
- Red Dress, an international 2009-2022 collaborative embroidery project coordinated by Kirstie Macleod
- Vanitas: Flesh Dress for an Albino Anorectic, created in 1987 by Jana Sterbak from 50 pounds of flank steak sewn together

== Other notable dresses ==
- Alice in Wonderland dress, as illustrated by John Tenniel in Lewis Carroll's 1865 novel
- Belle's ball gown, golden dress originally worn by the heroine of Disney's animated film Beauty and the Beast (1991)
- Da Jin, couture design by Guo Pei
- The dress, a photograph of a dress that became a viral phenomenon due to dispute over the color of the garment
- TechHaus Volantis, American electric-powered hover vehicle promoted by Lady Gaga as a "flying dress"

== See also ==
- List of hats
- List of most valuable celebrity memorabilia
- Alice blue, a color name that originally referred to a dress worn by Alice Roosevelt Longworth, daughter of US President Theodore Roosevelt
  - "Alice Blue Gown", 1919 song about the dress
