= Wedding dress of Princess Beatrice =

Wedding dress of Princess Beatrice may refer to:

- Wedding dress of Princess Beatrice of the United Kingdom
- Wedding dress of Princess Beatrice of York
