= Wedding dress of Princess Maud of Wales =

Dress worn by Princess Maud of Wales at her wedding to Prince Carl of Denmark in 1896

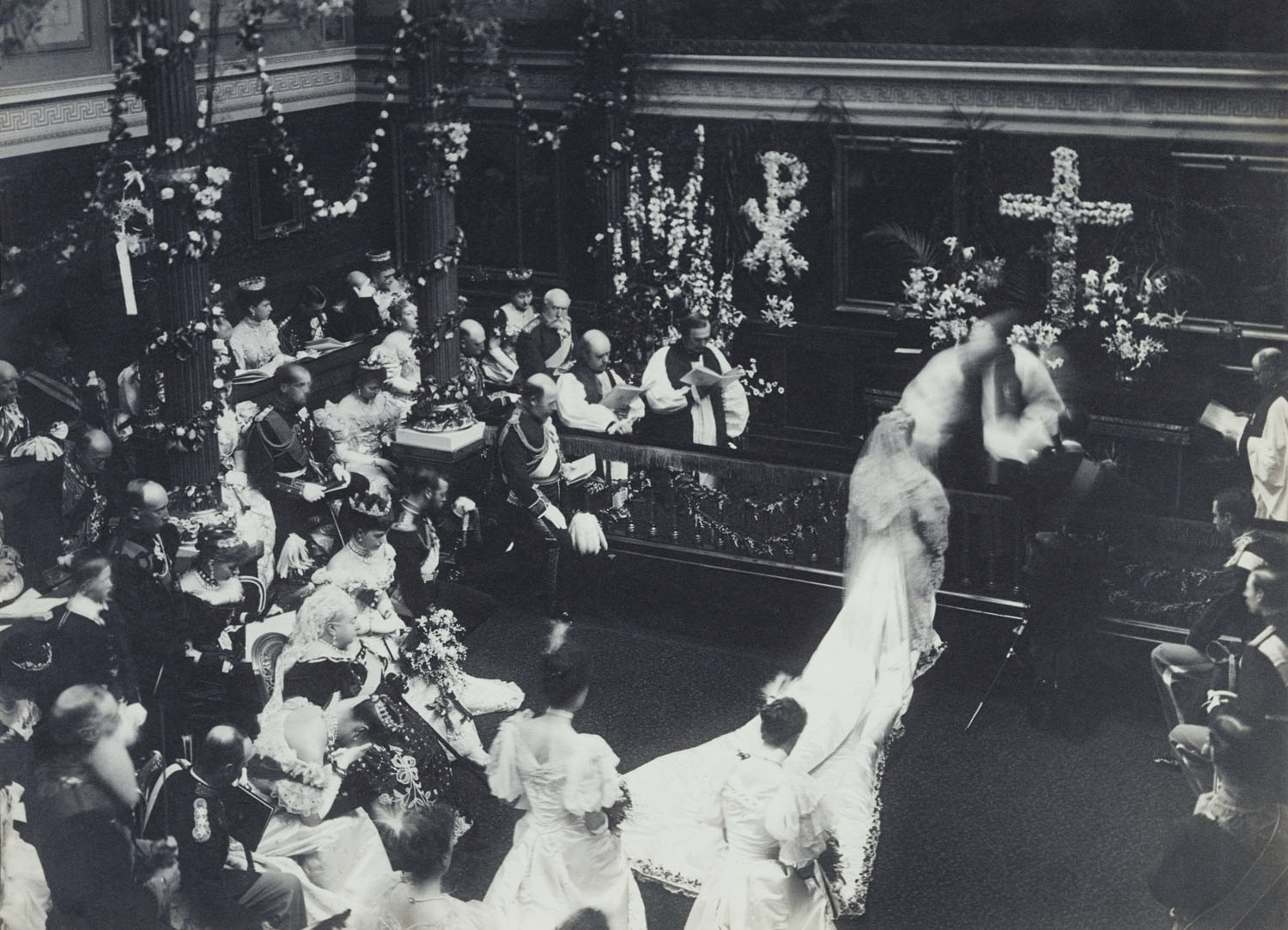
- Designer: Rosalie Whyte
- Year: 1896
- Type: White bridal dress
- Material: Spitalfields white silk satin with chiffon

The wedding dress of Princess Maud of Wales was worn at her wedding to Prince Carl of Denmark on 22 July 1896 in the Private Chapel at Buckingham Palace. Maud was the youngest daughter of Albert Edward, Prince of Wales and Alexandra, Princess of Wales; Carl was the second son of Crown Prince Frederick and Crown Princess Louise of Denmark.

The dress was designed by Rosalie Whyte of the Royal Female School of Art. The dress was made from white satin manufactured in Spitalfields, London, with chiffon and flowers at the skirt hem, and a long train bordered with orange blossoms. The waist was embroidered with silver and diamonds. Maud wore her mother's wedding veil. Maud wore minimal jewellery, with a choker on her neck and some bracelets; she also wore flowers on her head instead of a tiara. Her bouquet was a mix of white jasmine, orange blossom and German myrtle.

Among Maud's wedding gifts were:

- a diamond and pearl necklace which could convert into a tiara (from the Royal Warrant-Holders of England)
- a pearl and diamond tiara (from her parents, the Prince and Princess of Wales)
- a diamond tiara (from her friends)
- a ruby and diamond necklace (from her grandmother, the Queen)
- a diamond brooch (from Prince Carl)
- two diamond and pearl brooches (one from Baron Rothschild and his wife, the other from the Drapers' Company)
- a turquoise and diamond brooch (from her aunt, Empress Marie Feodorovna of Russia)
- a variety of bracelets (from her aunt the Duchess of Argyll, her uncle the King of the Hellenes, her uncle and aunt the Duke and Duchess of Saxe-Coburg and Gotha, and her godmother the late Duchess of Inverness).

== See also ==
- List of individual dresses
