= Wedding dress of Princess Mary =

Wedding dress of Princess Mary may refer to:

- Wedding dress of Princess Victoria Mary of Teck
- Wedding dress of Princess Mary of the United Kingdom
