= 2000 in red carpet fashion =

Red carpet fashion in 2000 was largely overshadowed by the revealing green Versace dress worn by Jennifer Lopez for February's Grammy awards, which became one of the most talked-about and widely publicized red-carpet dresses of the year. For the 57th Golden Globe Awards Halle Berry borrowed a glamorous Valentino dress, that was described as setting the standard for Golden Globe red carpet style, and according to Phillip Bloch, her stylist at the time, "began the time when a dress could actually make a career."

== Golden Globe Awards (January 23) ==
Until the late 1990s, many stars turned up to the Globes casually dressed, which made the impact of Halle Berry's glamorous white-and-red Valentino dress all the more powerful. InStyle rated it 18th in their list of Top 100 Dresses of the Decade, at the same time as it was called a "trainwreck" by the gossip webzine Radar Online in their list of best and worst Golden Globe fashions. When Valentino contacted Bloch to ask for the dress back, he informed them that as Berry had won (for Introducing Dorothy Dandridge) in it, it was part of her history and they weren't returning it. Another guest who received particular notice was Annette Bening in a maternity tuxedo by Lauren Sara, which she also wore to the Screen Actors Guild Awards on March 12.

Fashions at the Globes were reviewed in an E! television program hosted by Joan and Melissa Rivers and a panel of fashion experts.

== Grammys (February 23) ==
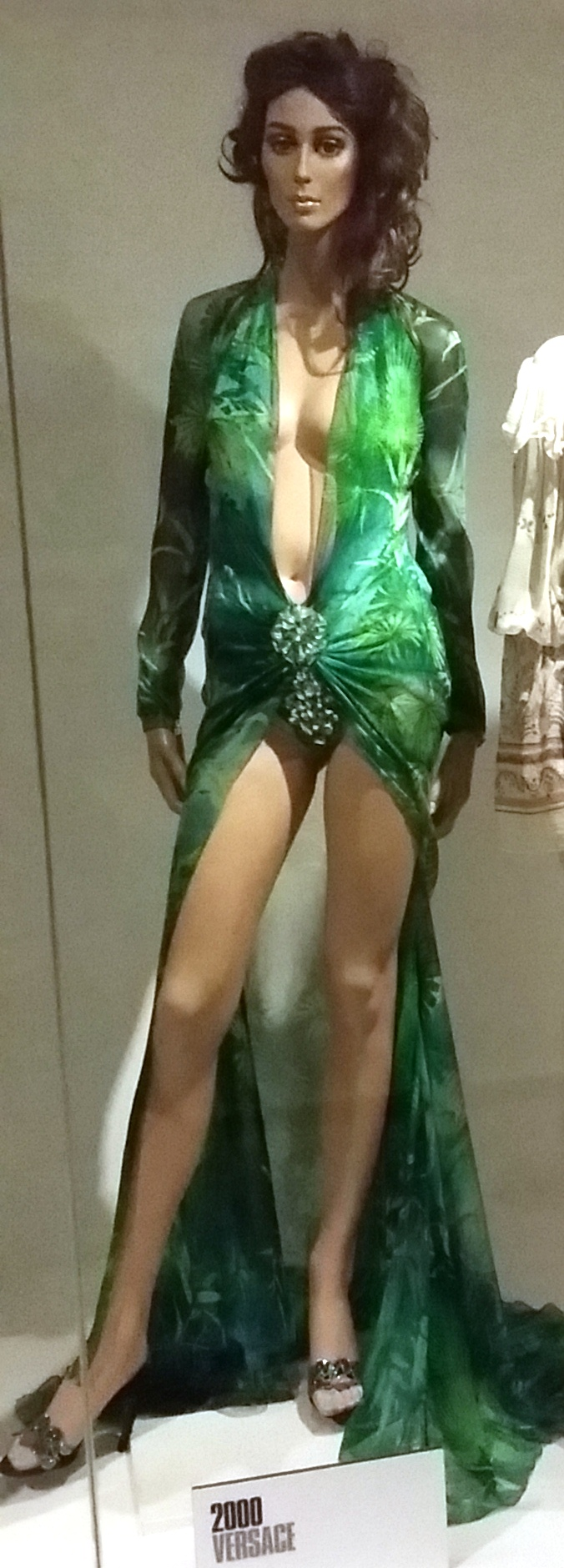
Versace dress as worn by Jennifer Lopez to the Grammys, 2000.

Jennifer Lopez's backless Donatella Versace for Versace dress, in flowing printed sheer silk chiffon worn over nude shorts, with a neckline plunging to the navel (held on by double-sided tape) and a skirt split to the waist, was one of the most talked-about and widely publicized red-carpet dresses of the year. Although associated with Lopez, the dress had previously been worn on the red carpet by Spice Girl Geri Halliwell at the first NRJ Music Awards in January 2000, and by Versace herself to a Costume Institute gala in New York on 6 December 1999.

== Academy Awards (March 26) ==
Despite speculation beforehand as to how much flesh would be bared, the gowns worn for the 72nd Academy Awards were more modest than expected. The predominant style of dress had a strapless bustier bodice baring the shoulders, although many stars wore outfits that revealed their cleavage, and many of the men wore traditional tuxedoes, with Keanu Reeves going for an all-black look. However, the two creators of South Park chose to wear drag, with Trey Parker wearing a full-skirted pink dress based on Gwyneth Paltrow's Oscar dress from the previous year, and Matt Stone wearing a replica of Lopez's green chiffon Versace dress from the Grammys.

Among the more successful gowns was Uma Thurman's crimson Alberta Ferretti dress which was voted 20th best red carpet gown of all time in a 2008 poll held by Debenhams. The form-fitting Vera Wang dress Charlize Theron wore to the ceremony was ranked third in the InStyle list of 100 best dresses of the decade, described as "Old Hollywood without looking old", and the BBC correspondent John Hand declared Theron one of the top 5 best-dressed women of the night. Hand also listed in his top 5 Nicole Kidman in golden Dior, Winona Ryder in simple black, Hilary Swank in a feminine olive green strapless dress, and Thora Birch, who he nominated as the most stylish of the night in her embroidered white skirt and pale blue jacket. Annette Bening, nine months pregnant, wore a layered black Armani gown.

Less well-received gowns included Erykah Badu's green leather outfit stitched together with yellow raffia paired with a traditional West-African style towering head-wrap, which Billy Crystal joked contained a missing Oscar. Hand compared Judi Dench's outfit by the Indian designers Abu Jani and Sandeep Khosla to net curtains, and Angelina Jolie's high necked, long-sleeved black Versace dress was still remembered in 2012 as a "Goth misery" that made her "a dead ringer for Morticia Addams".

== Emmys (September 10) ==
Trends on the red carpet at the 52nd Primetime Emmy Awards included backless or strapless dresses, sheer fabrics, and strong colors such as hot pinks, reds and cinnamon, with grey as an alternative.

One of the most controversial dresses of the night was a see-through Pamela Dennis design worn by Geena Davis. Sarah Jessica Parker wore a pink feathered Oscar de la Renta dress which she called a "fantasy dress" and her "first experience with real couture", but which, over ten years later, was still being cited as one of the worst Emmy dresses.
