= Navy blue Guy Laroche dress of Hilary Swank =

Dress worn at the 2005 Academy Awards

- Designer: Hervé L. Leroux for Guy Laroche
- Year: 2005
- Type: Navy blue backless dress

American actress Hilary Swank wore a navy blue backless Guy Laroche dress designed by Hervé L. Leroux to the 77th Academy Awards on February 27, 2005. In a poll by Debenhams published in The Daily Telegraph the dress was voted the 16th greatest red carpet gown of all time. Cosmopolitan magazine cited the dress as one of the Best Oscar dresses of all time, saying, "Making a serious comeback from that pink gauze number two years before, Hilary shows off her flawless back in this stunning sapphire gown by Guy Laroche. Appropriately, this is the year she won the Oscar for Best Actress in Million Dollar Baby, because that's exactly what she looks like in this dress."

== See also ==
- List of individual dresses
