= Wedding dress of Princess Helena of the United Kingdom =

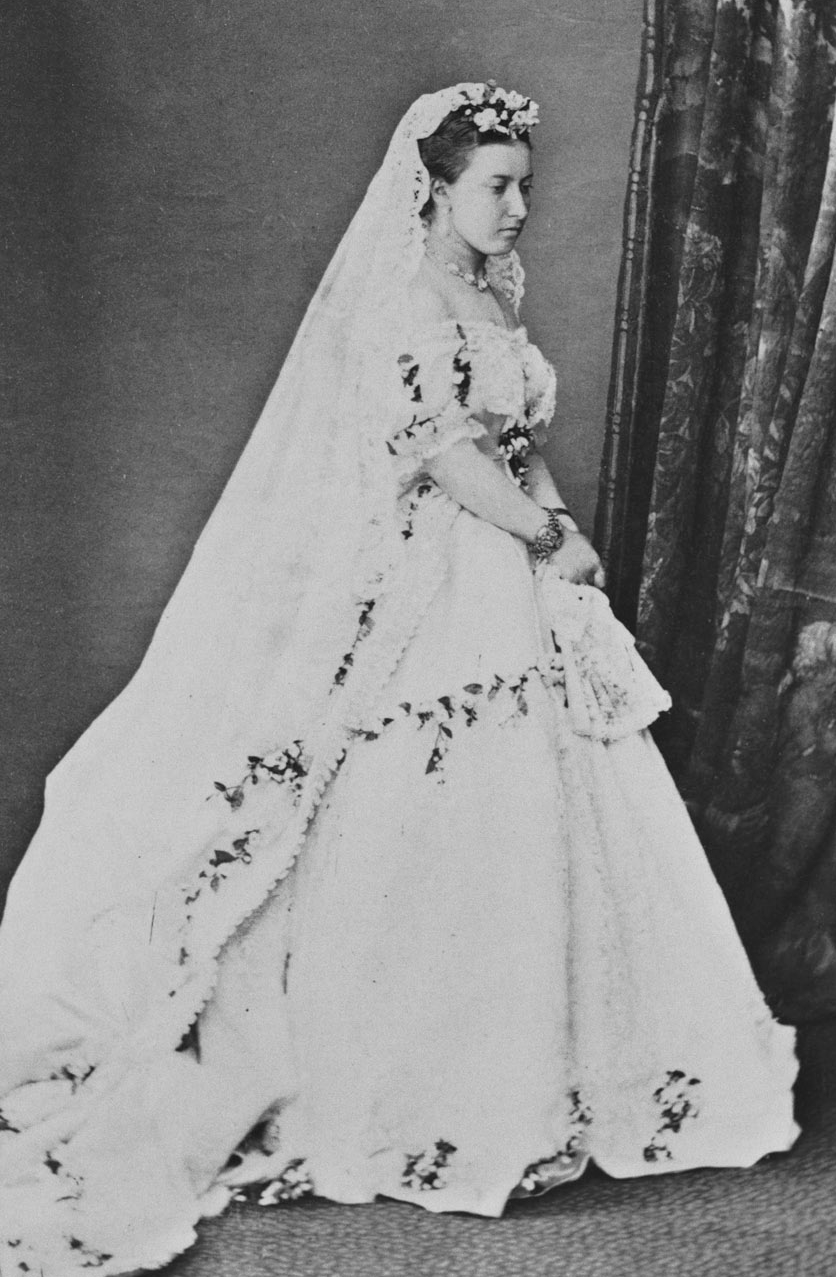
Princess Helena on 5 July 1866

Princess Helena, the fifth child and third daughter of Queen Victoria, wore a dress of white satin featuring deep flounces of Honiton lace, the design of which featured roses, ivy, and myrtle, for her marriage to Prince Christian of Schleswig-Holstein on 5 July 1866 at Windsor Castle, Windsor, Berkshire, England. Her headpiece was composed of orange blossom and myrtle, and the veil was also made of Honiton lace. She also wore a necklace, earrings, and brooch of opals and diamonds, a wedding gift from the Queen. Along with bracelets set with miniatures, Helena also wore the Order of Victoria and Albert.

The bridesmaids wore white tulle skirts trimmed with bouillons of tulle over white glace slips, with tunics of silver tulle and chatelaines of flowers; forget-me-nots, blush roses and heather, with wreaths and veils to match.

== See also ==
- List of individual dresses
