= Red Versace dress of Cindy Crawford =

1991 dress worn at the Academy Awards

- Designer: Versace
- Year: 1991
- Type: Red plunge dress

The red Versace dress of Cindy Crawford is the red plunge Versace dress worn by Cindy Crawford at the 63rd Academy Awards on March 25, 1991. The dress worn by the model and designed by Versace was a long evening dress in red, with straps and plunging neckline. The model, accompanied by her boyfriend of the time, the actor Richard Gere, presented the Oscar for Best Set Design along with Susan Sarandon. The Oscar red carpet of 1991 represents the first official occasion where Gere and Crawford were shown together as a couple.

== Reception ==
The dress had a major influence on fashion, and many copies and fakes of the dress were produced. The dress and the fame which Crawford generated also raised the profile of Gere at the time. Variety's Complete Book of Oscar Fashion said "Cindy Crawford lives up to the term "supermodel" in this chili-pepper hot Versace gown. She and handsome hubby-to-be Richard Gere could have been the hottest couple at the awards show."

In a poll by Debenhams published in The Telegraph the dress was voted the 12th greatest red carpet gown of all time. Another survey conducted in 2010 by the site offerssupermarket.co.uk positioned the dress of Crawford in tenth place of the most memorable clothing of the last fifty years, chosen by 44% of voters. The online magazine News & Celebrity Style Now put the red Versace gown among the ten best ever appeared on the red carpet at the Oscars.

== See also ==
- List of individual dresses
