= Blue Prada dress of Lupita Nyong'o =

Blue dress worn by Lupita Nyong'o

- Designer: Prada
- Year: 2014
- Type: Powder blue dress
- Material: Silk

Lupita Nyong'o wore a blue dress on March 2, 2014 to the 86th Academy Awards at the Dolby Theatre, at which she won the Academy Award for Best Supporting Actress for 12 Years a Slave (2013). In collaboration with Nyong'o, the gown was designed by Prada and styled by Micaela Erlanger. After the ceremony, the dress garnered critical praise from fashion blogs and publications, being cited on several 'best dressed' lists and considered one of the most significant gowns in Hollywood history.

== Background and design ==
Nyong'o fashion and Erlanger's styling after the release of her film, 12 Years a Slave, had been praised by media publications during awards season. After her nomination at the 86th Academy Awards for her performance in the film, designers Stella McCartney and Alexander McQueen had reportedly vied for Nyong'o's collaboration, but her stylist ultimately chose Prada to work with. The dress was custom designed. It went through five designs before determining the final look. Erlanger and Nyong'o worked with the brand on the sketch designs and inspirations used, including the essence of Old Hollywood, and the celebratory night of the Oscars. The shade of the gown, which Nyong'o referred to as "Nairobi blue", was inspired by her hometown in Kenya.

The dress is a powder blue georgette soleil silk ballgown with a plunging v-neckline, a low-cut back, a blue belt, and an empire, flowing pleated skirt with subtle crystal trim. Design elements of pastel hues and pleats in the skirt were consistent with trends shown on the Oscars red carpet as well as New York Fashion Week. The beaded trimming of the gown was designed to resemble champagne bubbles. The dress's neckline and silhouette was influenced by Elizabeth Taylor's 1969 dress to the Oscars, and the matching jewellery "a nod to Hollywood glamour". Her short hair was put into a cropped updo with added height. Nyong'o accessorized the gown with a matching manicure, complementary Prada sandal pumps and a clutch, as well as accessories from Fred Leighton, including a gold and diamond headband and a gold and rose-cut spiked diamond crescent earrings. She also wore a gold ring with a frog emblem, which is her family totem. The emblem was also sewn into a hidden tag in the gown. The 2014 ceremony was both Nyong'o's and Erlanger's first time in attendance at the Academy Awards. In the evening, Nyong'o won the accolade for the Best Supporting Actress category, and was photographed with the statuette alongside the ensemble.

== Reception ==
After Nyong'o was photographed in the gown, it gained widespread commentary and praise across fashion blogs and social media. The Washington Post's Cara Kelly acclaimed the gown as "a glorious cap" to an "impressive" award shows run. Booth Moore, a fashion critic of the Los Angeles Times, framed Nyong'o's gown as "sweet and striking", praising her "individual style statement". Allie Jones of The Atlantic asserted that Nyong'o's gown "murdered the Oscars fashion game" and was the best look of the night, while the New Yorker wrote that it was a "lightly more daring J. Crew wedding dress in its insistent breeziness". The Seattle Times described the gown as "ethereal" and "voluminous yet utterly simple." Stephanie Cary for the Los Angeles Daily News stated that Nyong'o "hit a grand slam" with the dress.

The gown featured on the best dressed lists of Vogue, MTV E!, HuffPost and the Standard for the award ceremony. Writing for The Telegraph, Bibby Sowray expressed that the dress had "now well and truly cemented itself in Hollywood history." The Seattle Times dubbed it a "standout among the stars" and one of the publication's favorite red carpet gowns from the past decade. Fashionista wrote that the ensemble would "go down as one of the all-time Hollywood classics." The Washington Post and Fashionista compared the dress to the previous looks of Elizabeth Taylor and Grace Kelly at previous Oscar ceremonies. Glamour magazine compared Nyong'o's dress to Cinderella's ballgown, while the New York Daily News stated that her acceptance speech was "heartwarming" and drew parallels to the character's story. Elle declared that the look "cemented Nyong'o as a style star."

== See also ==
- List of individual dresses
