= Red Dress (embroidery project) =

Collaborative embroidery project 2009–2022

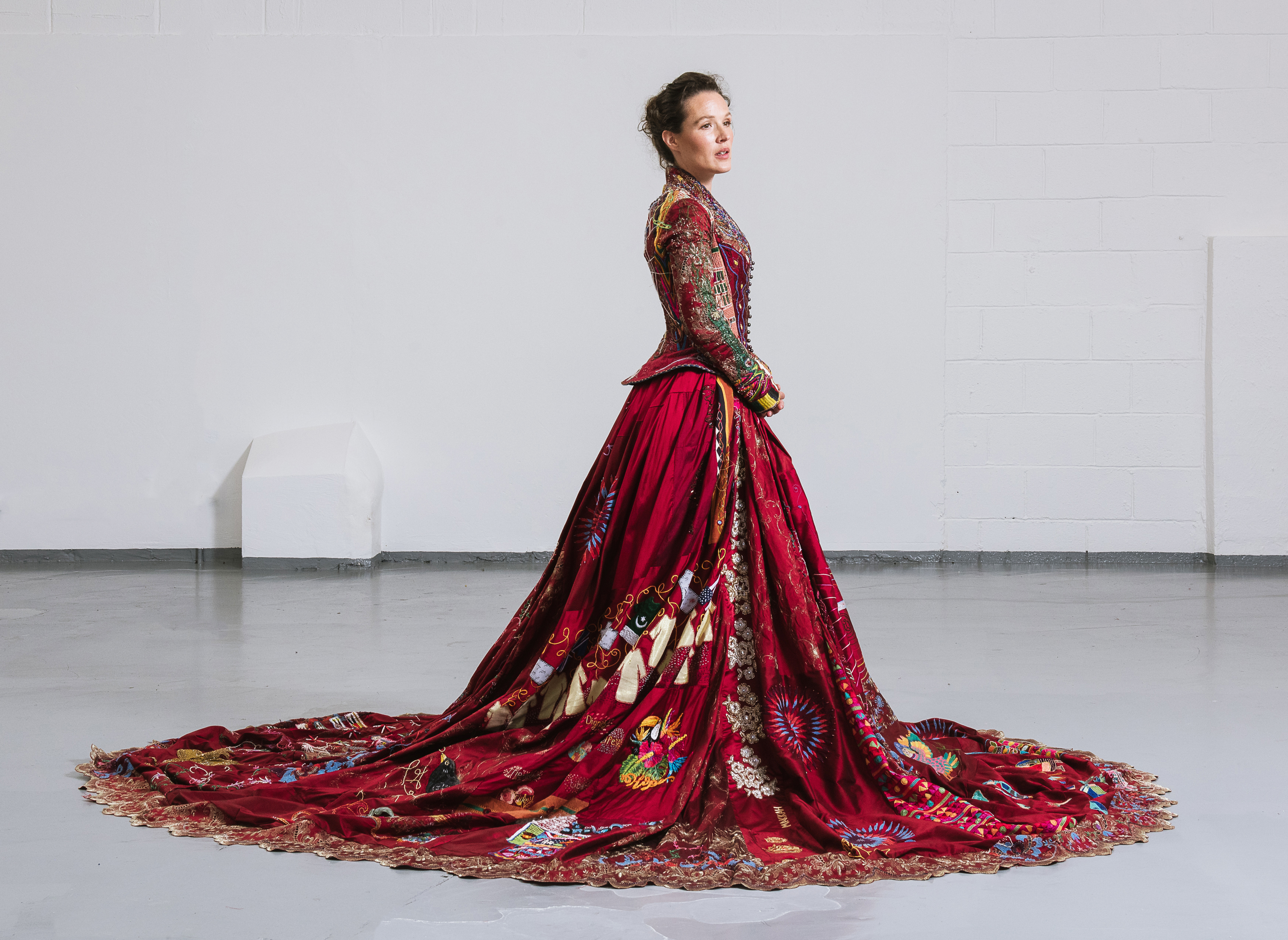
The dress in 2019

The Red Dress is an international collaborative embroidery project, created from 2009 to 2023 and coordinated by Somerset-based British artist Kirstie Macleod.

The project began with a commission from the British Council in Dubai, and has since been supported by Arts Council England, the British Embassy in Pristina, and many donations from individuals including a 2020 crowdfunder.

The dress was embroidered by 380 embroiderers (367 women or girls, 11 men or boys, and two non-binary people) from 51 countries. 141 of the embroiderers were paid for their work and receive a share of exhibition earnings; the others were volunteer participants at events and exhibitions. It is made up of 84 panels of burgundy silk dupion and weighs 20 kilograms (44 lb). Macleod has said that "The silhouette of this dress is intentionally strong and empowered. I've used military pattern cuts along the shoulders and front bodice, but I wanted it to read in a very feminine way. Every line is curved and it's fully corseted. I think it's got a regal presence." She chose red because "...you can't ignore red. I wanted it to be a real statement – and have a relationship with women's cycles, love, anger, passion.", adding "It's a practical colour as well as it can withstand travel!".

The dress has been exhibited around the world. Early exhibitions involved Macleod sitting wearing the dress while embroidering it, as an art installation: "When it was initially displayed, I was wearing it, sitting inside a cube in which I would live-embroider as a performance for four hours at a time." It was later exhibited on a mannequin to showcase its full form and intricate detail. It has been shown at venues including the Royal School of Needlework (UK), and the National Library of Kosovo in Pristina. As of 2022 plans for future venues include Australia, Canada, Columbia, Egypt, Pakistan, South Africa, and the United States; an exhibition at the Museo de Arte Popular in Mexico in 2020 was cancelled because of the COVID-19 pandemic.

Macleod was awarded first prize for the dress in the 2012 Premio Valcellina (Valcellina Award), an Italian international competition open to fibre artists under the age of 35 and which that year had the theme "Mixing cultures".

The project was originally called Barocco, the Portuguese term for an imperfect pearl, which Macleod said indicated that "it was something special but stuck inside a structure"; she changed it to "The Red Dress" as a more widely understood and easily pronounced title.

The Red Dress: Conversations in Stitch, by Kirstie Macleod, edited by Emma Bovill, was published in 2025 (Quickthorn: ISBN 978-1-7393160-8-2). The Red Dress entered into the Guinness World Records 2026 as the largest collaborative embroidery project on Earth.

== See also ==
- List of individual dresses
