= Black and white Valentino dress of Julia Roberts =

Worn at the 2001 Academy Awards

- Roberts wearing the dress on the red carpet of the 2001 Academy Awards.
- Designer: Valentino Garavani
- Year: 2001
- Type: Black and white Valentino dress

American actress Julia Roberts wore a black and white Valentino dress to the 73rd Academy Awards on March 25, 2001, during which she won the Academy Award for her performance in Erin Brockovich. The dress was floor-length, with a black body. A single white stripe ran down the front of the dress, splitting into a Y-shape at the bust to form a pair of straps. In the back, the dress fanned out into a black tulle train with several more white stripes running down it.

Widely praised by fashion critics, a poll by Debenhams, published in The Daily Telegraph, voted it the "third most iconic red carpet dress of all time". The dress was a vintage 1992 design from the Valentino archives, intended to evoke the style of classic Hollywood; Valentino had designed for prominent fashion icons such as Jackie Kennedy and Elizabeth Taylor.

== Background ==
The dress was originally designed for Valentino's 1992 haute couture collection, and had previously been worn by presenter Lorella Cuccarini while hosting the 1993 Sanremo Music Festival. It is currently in the company's archives. Roberts was dressed by Debbi Mason. This was known to Valentino who realized he had "struck gold" because his employee Cristina Viera had been an acquaintance of Mason in England in the 1980s when Mason has been an editor for British Elle and Viera had worked for fashion house Jasper Conran. This led to Viera contacting Mason to offer the dress. Roberts had previously tried on dresses sent by most of the other top designers but was not particularly impressed by any of them. Convinced they had the right dress for her, in the very week of the Oscars, Viera arranged for Roberts to come to a fitting at Valentino Beverly Hills. Viera remarked that Roberts looked "absolutely stunning" and Roberts was reported to have said "I just thought it was a pretty dress". The black column gown with white piping had been slightly too small for Roberts but a tailor made some last-minute adjustments.

== Reception ==
Valentino himself has cited the moment Roberts collected her Oscar for Best Actress wearing his gown as the high point of his 45-year career. "I have dressed so many people but I have to be sincere. The person that made me feel so very, very happy was Julia Roberts. When she got the Academy Award for Erin Brockovich I watched it on television and really I was so excited that she appeared in my dress." The dress was originally made for the 1992 Valentino couture collections, now in the company archives. In the Valentino fashion show the dress was modeled by Christy Turlington.

The dress proved very popular with teenage girls and many copies were sold and worn as prom dresses throughout the United States. Other dresses were designed very similarly in the black and white style later in 2001, such as Thierry Mugler's design, valued at $600.

== See also ==
- List of individual dresses
