= Chartreuse Dior dress of Nicole Kidman =

Dress worn by Nicole Kidman in 1997

- Designer: John Galliano for Dior
- Year: 1997
- Type: Chartreuse dress

Australian actress Nicole Kidman wore a chartreuse Chinoiserie Dior dress to the 69th Academy Awards on March 24, 1997. The dress was designed by John Galliano.

W magazine stated that the dress was "a landmark moment for both designer and wearer: Galliano had just been appointed creative director of Dior the previous fall, and Kidman's Oscars appearance signaled his arrival as a potent new force on the red carpet".

The Daily Telegraph included the dress on their list of "the most memorable Oscars red carpet dresses of all time" and said the dress "changed the course of red carpet fashion". The Smithsonian Institution called it one of the most influential Oscar dresses of all time.

Melissa Rivers, who covered the Oscars for E! that year, called it "the first true couture dress on the red carpet". Joan Rivers, also covering the event, said the colour of the dress was ugly and mimed retching noises. W magazine called the dress a "flawless, devastating silk gown in iridescent chartreuse that immediately appalled Joan Rivers and upstaged Tom Cruise." Women's Wear Daily executive Bridget Foley told Vanity Fair that Joan Rivers' comment changed the red carpet, "I mark that observation as a turning point. A sad turning point away from anything remotely fashion-y and interesting toward the melting pot of mundane we see today on the red carpet."

Writing in 2003 for Vogue, Sally Singer described the dress as "the first time anybody had worn haute couture to the Oscars with real conviction." Kidman told her that the dress was still her favorite red carpet piece.

== See also ==
- List of individual dresses
