= Wedding dress of Princess Helen of Waldeck and Pyrmont =

1882 wedding dress

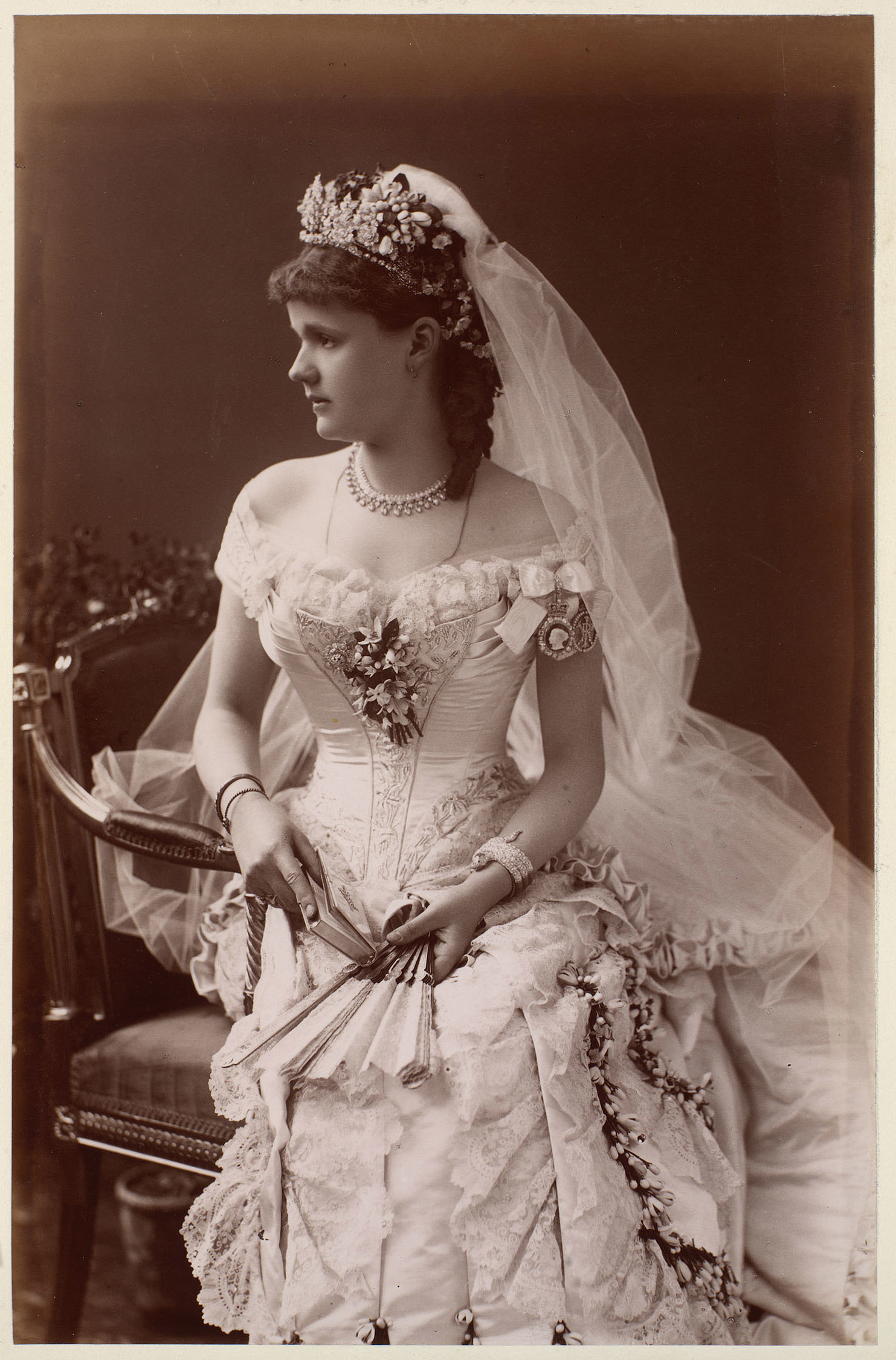
Princess Helen on her wedding day

The wedding dress of Princess Helen of Waldeck and Pyrmont was worn by the bride at her wedding to Prince Leopold, Duke of Albany, on 27 April 1882 in St. George's Chapel, Windsor Castle. Prince Leopold was the youngest son of Queen Victoria and Prince Albert. Princess Helen was the daughter of George Victor, Prince of Waldeck and Pyrmont and his wife Princess Helena of Nassau.

The dress was made in Paris and was presented by her sister, Queen consort Emma of the Netherlands. The gown was made of white satin, decorated with traditional orange blossom and myrtle and trimmed with fleur-de-lis, with the edge topped with point d'Alençon and white satin. The long tulle veil was held in place by a diamond head dress and a wreath of orange blossoms and myrtle. The shoulders were bare and the short drop sleeves adorned with the Royal Family Order of Victoria and Albert and the Companion of the Order of the Crown of India pinned to the left. The bosom was swathed in tulle and ruched laces with a small bouquet of flowers. The fashionably cut bodice ended in a sharp V–shape that accentuated the bride's tall and slender figure.

Helen received large diamond sprays from the King and Queen of the Netherlands, which she wore as a tiara and brooch on her wedding day. From her parents, she received a diamond necklace and sun rays that she also wore as brooches.

Prince Leopold gave his bride a diamond necklace, a large diamond star, a ruby bracelet, a ruby and diamond bracelet, sapphire and diamond earrings, Spanish lace, and a fan, which can also be seen in her wedding photos.

== See also ==
- List of individual dresses
