= Wedding dress of Victoria, Princess Royal =

Dress worn in 1858 wedding in London

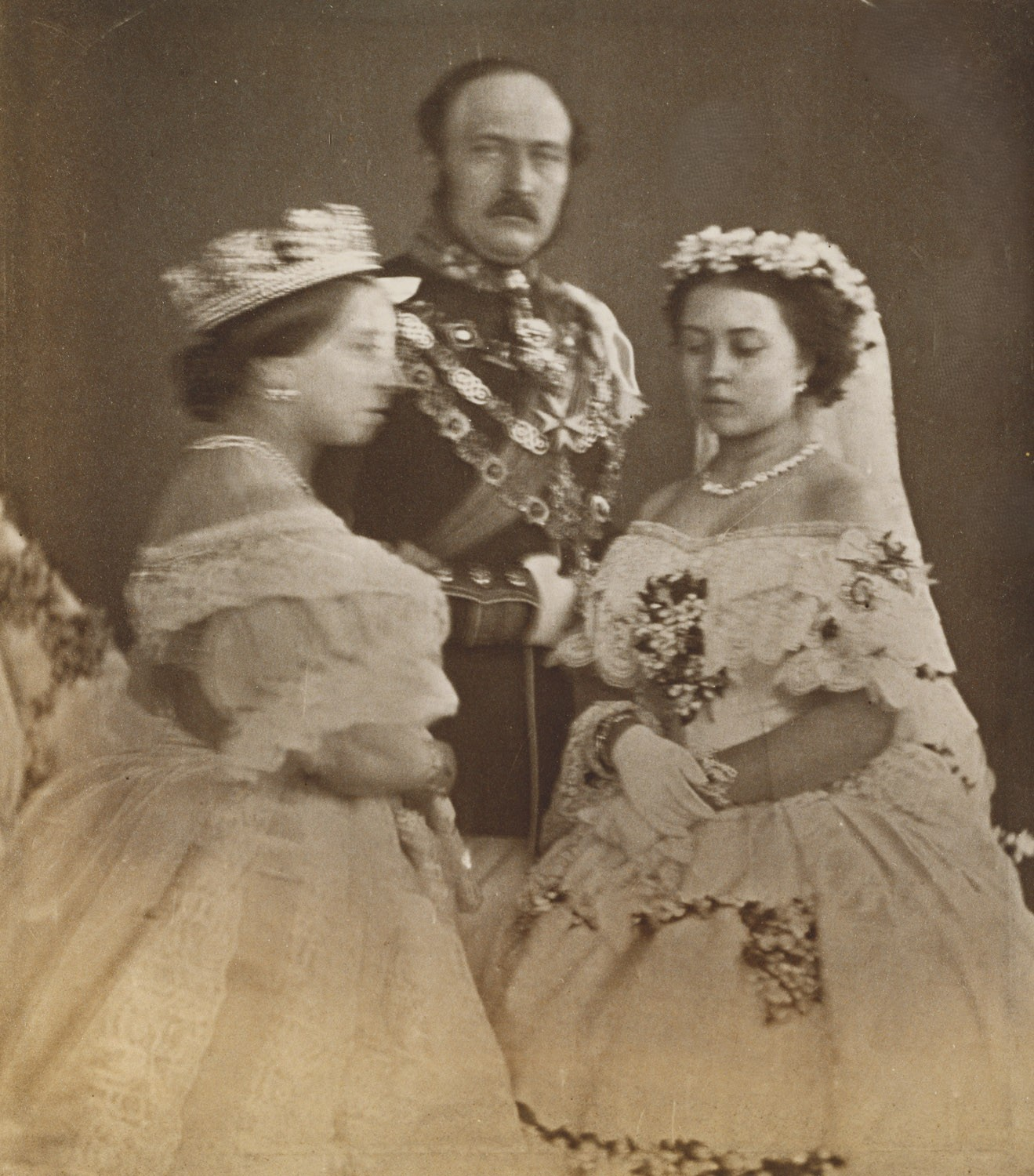
Left to right: Queen Victoria, Prince Albert, and Victoria, Princess Royal, in the clothes they wore for the princess's wedding

The wedding dress of Victoria, Princess Royal, was worn by the eldest daughter of Queen Victoria in 1858.

On 25 January 1858, a royal wedding took place that was designed to align the fortunes of Europe's two most important powers, Great Britain and Germany's chief principality, Prussia. The bride was Victoria, Princess Royal, the oldest child of Queen Victoria and her husband, Prince Albert. She married Prince Frederick of Prussia, later Frederick III, German Emperor and King of Prussia, son of Prince Wilhelm (heir-presumptive to the Prussian throne) and Augusta of Saxe-Weimar-Eisenach, at St. James's Palace, Chapel Royal, St. James's, London, England.

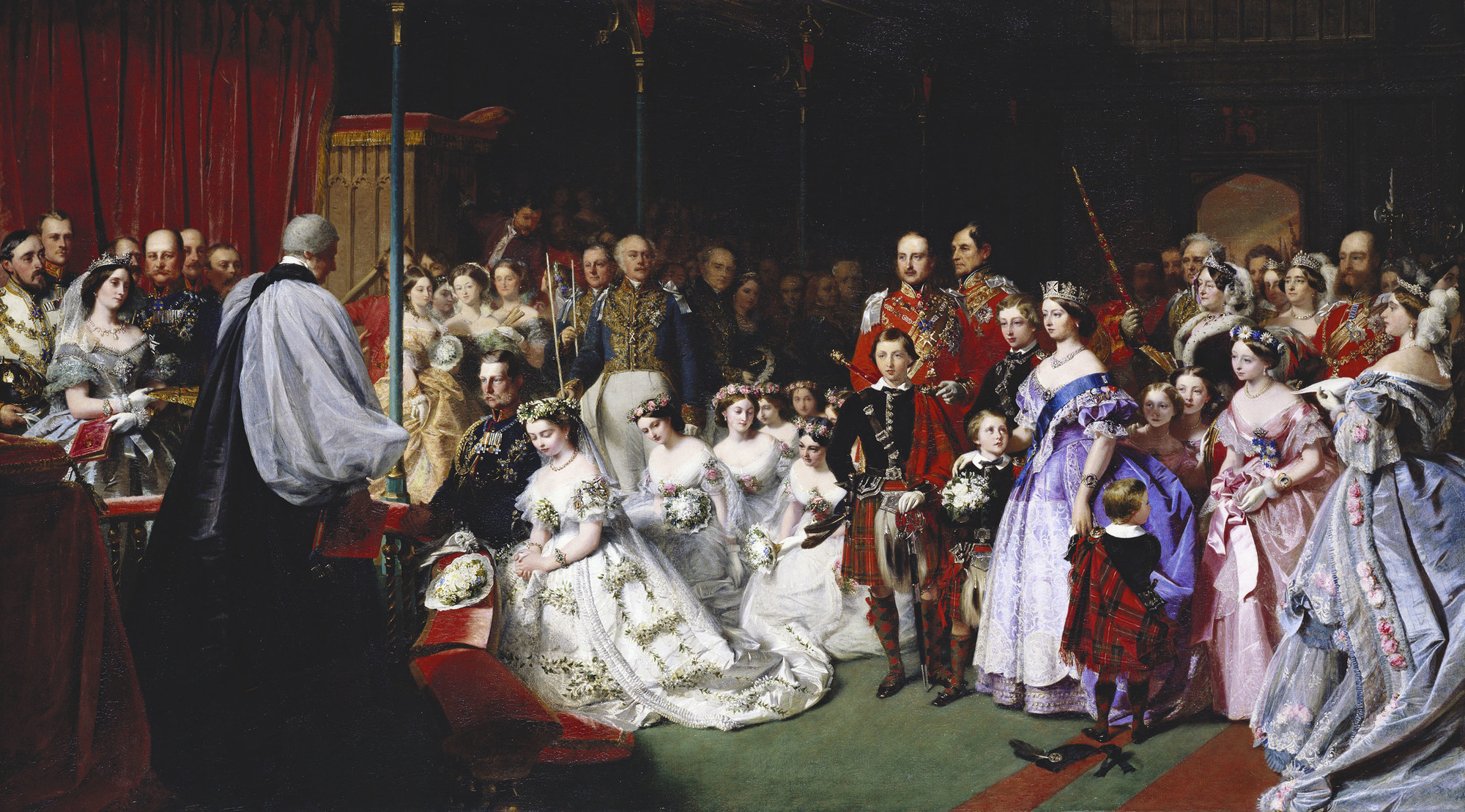
The Marriage of Victoria, Princess Royal by John Phillip

The dress was composed of a rich robe of white moire antique ornamented with three flounces of Honiton lace. The design of the lace consisted of bouquets in open work of the rose, shamrock, and thistle in three medallions. At the top of each flounce on the front of the dress were wreaths of orange and myrtle blossoms, the latter being the bridal flower of Germany. Every wreath ended with bouquets of the same flowers and the length of each being so graduated as to give the appearance of a robe hemmed with flowers. The apex of this floral pyramid was formed by a large bouquet worn on the girdle. The train, which was of an unusual length of more than three yards, was of white moire antique, trimmed with two rows of Honiton lace surmounted by wreaths similar to those on the flounces of the dress with bouquets at short intervals.

== See also ==
- List of individual dresses
