= Pink feathered Versace dress of Penélope Cruz =

- Designer: Versace
- Year: 2007
- Type: Pink strapless feathered dress

A pink strapless feathered Versace dress was worn by Penélope Cruz at the 79th Academy Awards on February 25, 2007.

== Legacy ==
In a poll by Debenhams published in The Daily Telegraph the dress was voted the 15th greatest red carpet gown of all time. Cosmopolitan magazine cited the dress as one of the Best Oscar dresses of all time, saying, "Penélope ruffled a lot of feathers — pun intended — with this dress. People either loved it or hated it big-time. We're signing up for the first group. It's a gorgeous color, fit her perfectly, and was a bold choice that she gets major points for pulling off." In 2023, Marie Claire, The Independent, and Insider all listed the dress as among the best Oscars dresses of all time.

== See also ==
- List of individual dresses
