= Wedding dress of Princess Eugenie of York =

Dress worn by Princess Eugenie of York at her wedding to Jack Brooksbank in 2018

- Designer: Peter Pilotto; Christopher de Vos
- Year: 2018
- Material: Silk

The wedding dress of Princess Eugenie of York worn at her wedding to Jack Brooksbank on 12 October 2018 was designed by the British fashion designers Peter Pilotto and Christopher de Vos of British-based label Peter Pilotto.

== Pre-wedding speculation ==
In a pre-wedding interview, Eugenie had said: "I'm not telling anyone who is making it, but I can say it is a British-based designer ... As soon as we announced the wedding, I knew the designer, and the look, straight away". British-based designer Erdem was the bookmakers' favourite to design Eugenie's wedding dress. Suzannah and Stella McCartney were also among the bookmakers' favourite choices.

== Designers and dress details ==
Peter Pilotto, a British-based label, was founded in 2007 by Peter Pilotto and Christopher de Vos. Known for their "innovative textile design, paired with a modern feminine silhouette", the label has provided Eugenie with several outfits during the past years.

Pilotto and de Vos searched through archives and viewed previous bridal gowns and eventually identified a silhouette. The wedding gown was then made layer by layer after several fittings, "with the corset and complex underskirt before moving on to the fitted bodice and full pleated skirt". It features a wide-neck V shape, folded shoulders and a low back "that drapes into a flowing full-length train". Eugenie personally asked the designers to make an open-back dress as she wanted her scar from the scoliosis operation that she underwent at the age of 12 to be revealed. In an interview before the wedding she had spoken about the importance of "showing people your scars".

The fabric for the dress was created at the designers' studios and featured different symbols in form of "rope-like motifs, woven into a jacquard of silk, cotton and viscose blend". These were a Scottish thistle, to show "the couple's fondness for Balmoral", an Irish shamrock, "a nod to the bride's [maternal] family", a York Rose, a reference to her family name of York, and ivy, which represented the Ivy Cottage, the couple's residence at Kensington Palace.

The dress along with the tiara was exhibited by the Royal Collection Trust at Windsor Castle from 1 March until 22 April 2019.

== See also ==
- List of individual dresses
