= Cyclone (Jeanne Lanvin) =

Dress by Jeanne Lanvin

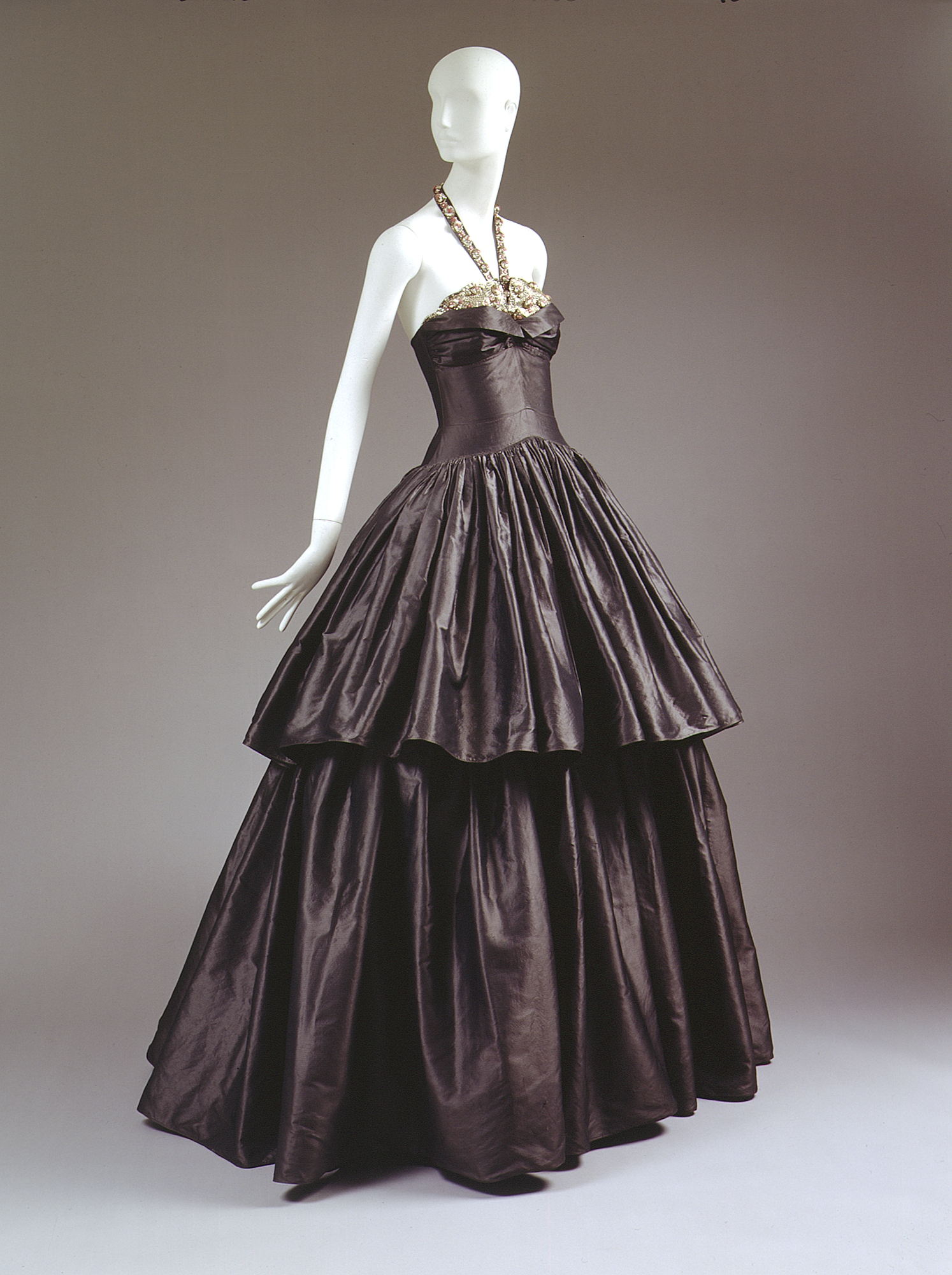
- Artist: Jeanne Lanvin
- Year: 1939
- Location: Metropolitan Museum of Art, United States
- Accession no.: C.I.46.4.18a, b
- Identifiers: The Met object ID: 82103

"Cyclone" is a black evening dress created by grand couturier Jeanne Lanvin in 1939. It is in the collection of the Metropolitan Museum of Art (The Costume Institute).

== History ==
Lanvin's daughter Comtesse Jean de Polignac (née Marguerite di Pietro, also known as Marie-Blanche) wore this dress in 1939.

The dress also has a detachable pocket that could be worn around the waist on a thin belt.

== Variations ==
There is another version of this dress at the Kunstgewerbemuseum in Berlin, Germany, which has an identical skirt but a different bodice. Primary sources indicate that there was a pink version worn by the wife of the French ambassador to Britain, as well as another black version in the Palais Galliera in Paris, France. The black version in Paris also has the detachable pocket.

== Exhibitions ==
- 1940, "Exhibition of Dresses Worn by Well-known Women of Europe and America," The John Wanamaker Auditorium in New York City.
- 1941, "Paris Openings, 1932–1940," at the Metropolitan Museum of Art.
- 1951, "Seeds of Fashion" at the Metropolitan Museum of Art.
- 2002–2003, "Blithe Spirit: The Windsor Set" at the Metropolitan Museum of Art.

== See also ==
- List of individual dresses
