= Saffron Vera Wang dress of Michelle Williams =

Worn on March 5, 2006, to the 78th Academy Awards

- Designer: Vera Wang
- Year: 2006
- Type: Saffron dress

The Michelle Williams saffron Vera Wang dress is a saffron yellow gown designed by Vera Wang and worn by actress Michelle Williams at the 78th Academy Awards on March 5, 2006. The dress features a deep neckline, dramatic ruffles, and is constructed from chiffon and tulle. It has been cited by publications including Cosmopolitan and The Daily Telegraph as one of the most memorable Oscar dresses of all time.

== Design ==
Katherine E. Krohn, in her book Vera Wang: Enduring Style, describes the creation of the gown as a meticulous process. Wang worked closely with Williams through hundreds of sketches before settling on a final design. The dress was fitted to Williams using a mock-up fabric before the final garment was assembled by a seamstress, resulting in a chiffon and tulle gown with a deep neckline and dramatic ruffles.

== Reception ==
Cosmopolitan named the dress among the best Oscar gowns of all time, describing it as evoking the aesthetic of classic Hollywood cinema and praising the cut as particularly flattering, noting that Williams had given birth to her daughter Matilda only three months before the ceremony. The Daily Telegraph included the dress in its list of the most memorable Oscar red carpet gowns.

== See also ==
- List of individual dresses
