= Amsterdam Rainbow Dress =

Dress made of flags of nations where same-sex relations are illegal

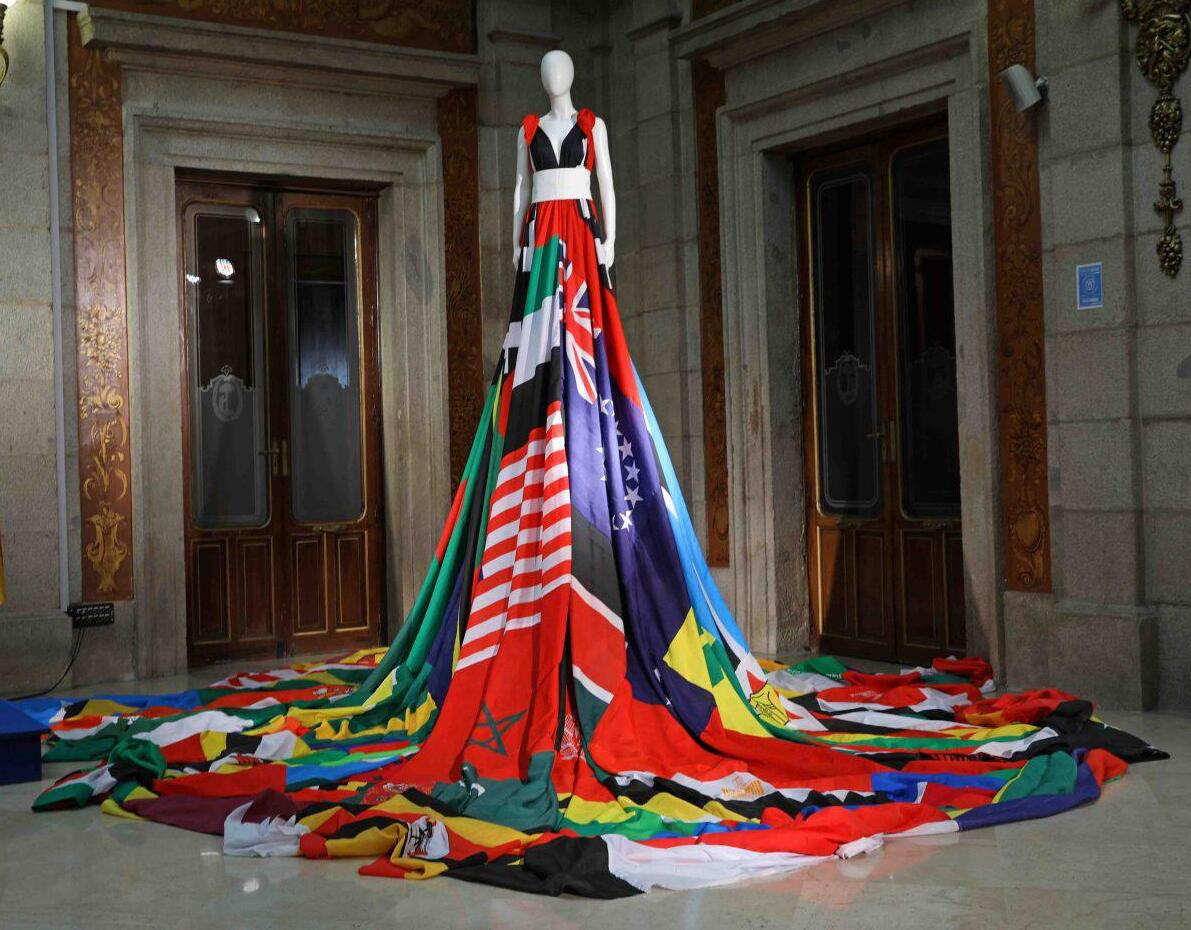
- The dress in Madrid in 2018

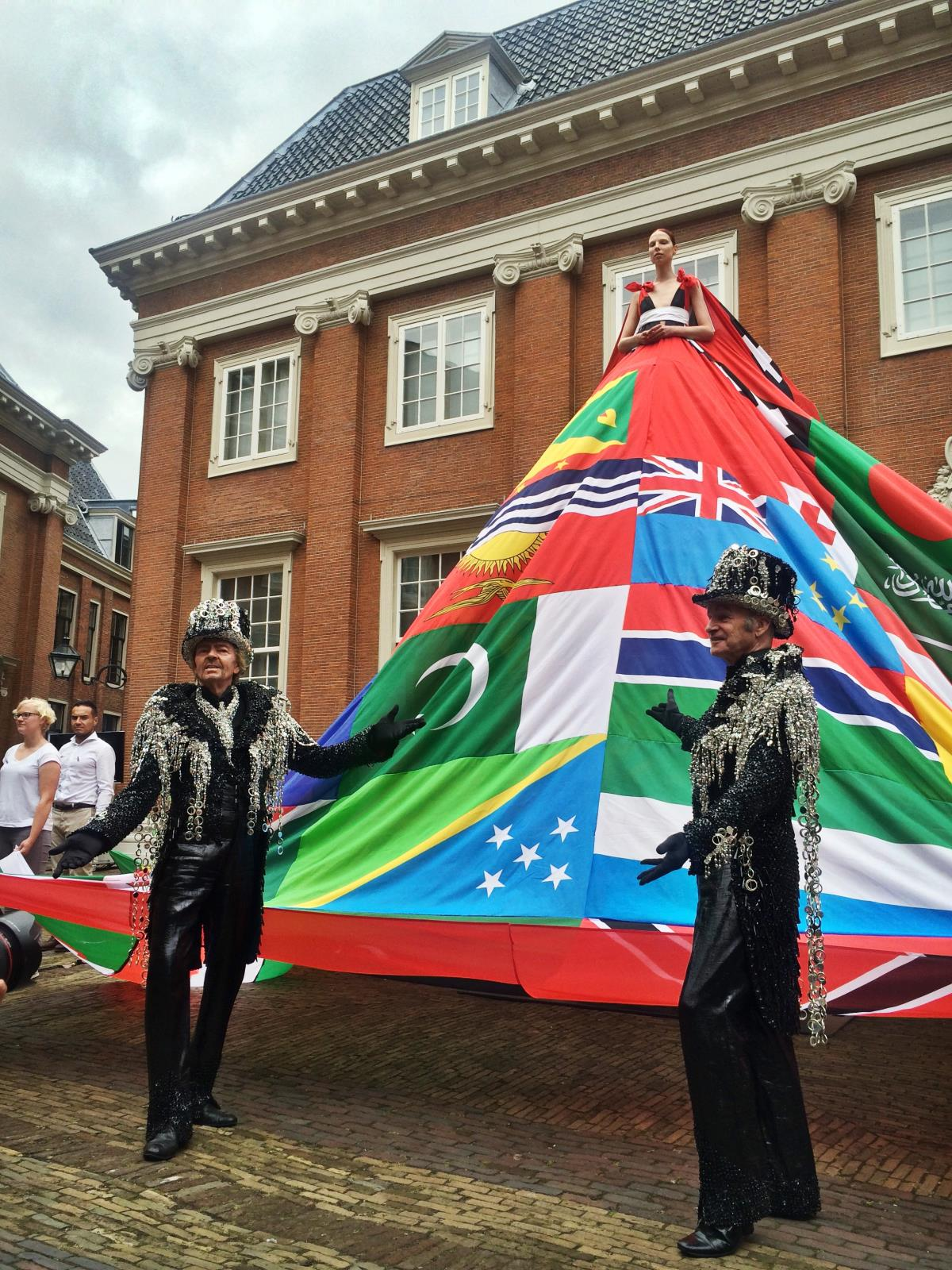
The dress in the Netherlands in 2017

The Amsterdam Rainbow Dress is a dress made of more than 70 flags of nations where same-sex relations are illegal, commemorating LGBTQ+ victims of persecution. The dress has a diameter of 52 feet and has been displayed in San Francisco, Cape Town, and Ottawa, among other cities.

Icesis Couture, Lola Rodríguez, and Valentijn de Hingh have modeled the dress.

== List of flags ==
The Amsterdam Rainbow Dress in its current form consists of 66 national flags, 4 Amsterdam city flags, and 11 rainbow flags which represents countries whose flag has been formerly represented in this dress but have since adopted LGBTQIA+ legislation.

=== Row 1 ===
- Rainbow flag (Formerly Singapore)
- Rainbow flag (Formerly Angola)
- Uganda
- Qatar

=== Row 5 ===
- Rainbow flag (Formerly Mauritius)
- Comoros
- Ghana
- Turkmenistan
- Cameroon
- Palestine

=== Row 11 ===
- Namibia
- Egypt
- Afghanistan
- Morocco
- Dominica
- Senegal

=== Row 17 ===
- Malawi
- Samoa
- Kenya
- Malaysia
- Uzbekistan
- Ethiopia

=== Row 23 ===
- Papua New Guinea
- Sudan
- Saint Vincent and the Grenadines
- Rainbow flag (Formerly Cook Islands)
- United Arab Emirates
- Maldives
- Eswatini
- Brunei

=== Row 31 ===
- Rainbow flag (Formerly Antigua and Barbuda)
- Zimbabwe
- Rainbow flag (Formerly Botswana)
- Amsterdam bodice (upper)
- Tanzania
- Togo
- Tunisia

=== Row 39 ===
- Myanmar
- Kuwait
- Iraq
- Amsterdam bodice (lower)
- Bangladesh
- Guyana
- Rainbow flag (Formerly Belize)

=== Row 47 ===
- Guinea
- Yemen
- Jamaica
- Grenada
- Tonga
- Saudi Arabia
- Eritrea
- Rainbow flag (Formerly Saint Kitts and Nevis)

=== Row 55 ===
- Oman
- Iran
- Kiribati
- Tuvalu
- Lebanon
- Nigeria

=== Row 61 ===
- Indonesia
- Barbados
- Pakistan
- The Gambia
- Rainbow flag (Formerly Bhutan)
- Rainbow flag (Formerly India)

=== Row 67 ===
- Algeria
- Burundi
- Solomon Islands
- Sierra Leone
- Mauritania
- Saint Lucia

=== Row 73 ===
- Syria
- Libya
- Rainbow flag (Formerly Trinidad and Tobago)
- Liberia
- Chad

=== Row 78 ===
- South Sudan
- Zambia
- Somalia
- Sri Lanka

== See also ==
- List of individual dresses
