= Red Ben de Lisi dress of Kate Winslet =

- Designer: Ben de Lisi
- Year: 2002
- Type: Red one-shoulder flower strap dress

English actress Kate Winslet wore a red one-shoulder flower strap dress designed by Ben de Lisi to the 74th Academy Awards on 24 March 2002. The shoulder strap, composed of a garland of silk roses, was evocative of Spanish flamenco dancers. In a poll by Debenhams published in The Daily Telegraph the dress was voted the seventh greatest red carpet gown of all time.

Cosmopolitan has cited the gown as one of the best Oscar dresses of all time, stating, "This dress is ultra-flattering on Kate, and it's a great color for her very fair skin and strawberry blond hair. The flowery, embroidered strap is a pretty detail that makes this simple gown fit for the red carpet".

== See also ==
- List of individual dresses
