= Wedding dress of Princess Charlotte of Wales =

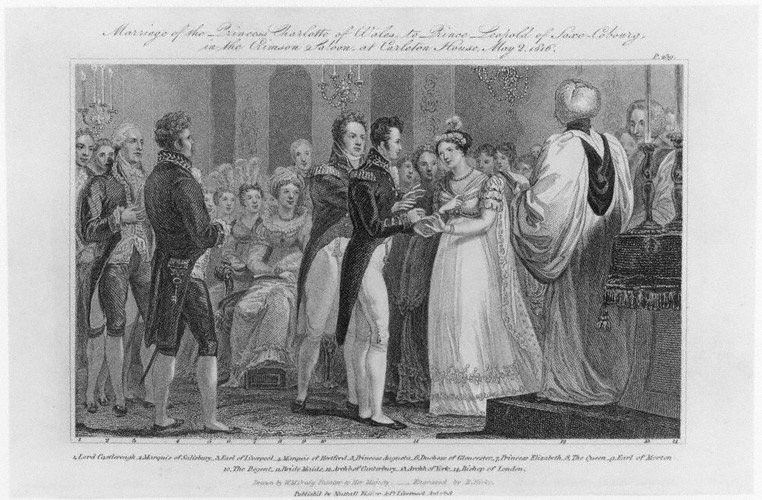
- Designer: Mrs. Triaud
- Year: 1816
- Type: White slip dress
- Material: White silk satin with silver lamé and Brussels lace

The wedding dress of Princess Charlotte of Wales was worn at her wedding to Prince Leopold of Saxe-Coburg-Saalfeld on 2 May 1816 at Carlton House in London. Charlotte was the only child of George, Prince of Wales and Caroline of Brunswick; Leopold was the youngest son of Francis, Duke of Saxe-Coburg-Saalfeld and Countess Augusta Reuss of Ebersdorf.

Princess Charlotte's wedding dress was a white and silver slip, covered with transparent silk net embroidered in silver lamé with shells and flowers. The sleeves were trimmed with Brussels lace, and the six-foot train was made with the same material as the slip and was fastened like a cloak with a diamond clasp. The dress reportedly cost £10,000 (equivalent to approximately £575,000 in 2017) to make, and was designed by the London dressmaker "Mrs. Triaud".

The dress has been preserved, and now forms part of the collection owned by Historic Royal Palaces. It is the oldest such garment in the collection, and is now very fragile, owing to its age.

Princess Charlotte paired the dress with earrings, pearls, and an armlet, a wedding gift from Prince Leopold.

== See also ==
- List of individual dresses
