= Silver Julien Macdonald dress of Paris Hilton =

Dress worn by socialite Paris Hilton

- Designer: Julien Macdonald
- Year: 2002
- Type: Silver mini dress

In 2002, American socialite Paris Hilton wore a silver dress designed by Julien Macdonald to celebrate her birthday in London. The dress is closely associated with Hilton and with early 2000s fashion in general.

== Design ==
First appearing in the Julien Macdonald spring/summer 2002 ready-to-wear collection, the silver chainmail-style halter dress features a cowl neck and an asymmetric hem.

== Legacy ==
In 2015, i-D named Paris Hilton's 21st birthday one of the 35 "most fashionable parties of all time" in honor of the dress.

Hilton has reworn the dress or similar garments on numerous occasions; like Hilton herself, the silver dress is seen as emblematic of 2000s culture and is often referenced by other fashion and pop culture figures. Model Kendall Jenner wore the same design on her own 21st birthday in 2016 and posted an Instagram photo with a caption referencing Hilton. In 2018, Hilton's sister Nicky Hilton wore the dress for Halloween, also referencing Paris' 21st birthday party in an Instagram post.

== See also ==
- List of individual dresses
