= Swarovski crystal mesh Armani Privé gown =

Dress worn by Cate Blanchett

- Designer: Giorgio Armani
- Year: 2007
- Type: Shimmery silver one-shoulder dress

A Swarovski crystal mesh Armani Privé gown was worn by Cate Blanchett at the 79th Academy Awards on 25 February 2007. It is a one shoulder long grey mesh gown studded with Swarovski crystals, described as a "stunning" dress by The Hollywood Reporter.

Blanchett stated that her decision to choose the dress had been "absolutely painless," and had seen it at the Armani show in Paris and knew that it was the dress for her. She stood out on an Oscar night where "Mint green, chic neutrals and shades of blue dominated".

== Reception ==
Cosmopolitan magazine cited the slinky, shimmery-silver, one-shoulder dress as one of the Best Oscar dresses of all time, saying, "Cate makes the list twice because of her consistently impeccable style. This one-shouldered gunmetal gown clings to her fabulous body like it was painted on, and the delicate and elegant hair and makeup complete the look without distracting us from the dress."

== See also ==
- List of individual dresses
