= Diffus Design =

Danish design and consultancy company

- Type: Private
- Founded: 2004
- Founder: Michel Guglielmi; Hanne-Louise Johannesen
- Headquarters: Copenhagen, Denmark
- Website: www.diffus.dk

Diffus Design is a design and consultancy company based in Copenhagen, Denmark. It was founded in 2004 by Michel Guglielmi and Hanne-Louise Johannesen as a creative partnership. The Diffus Design team works with theoretical and practical approaches toward art, design, architecture, and new media.

The company creates new products with the help of sensor technology merged with traditional materials and craft. It focuses on design and uses intelligent textiles, wearable technology, tangible interfaces, composite materials, and interactive installations. Diffus Design is in a close working relationship with other organizations such as Forster Rohner, Inntex, and Alexandra Instituttet as well as Delft University of Technology).

Diffus Design also undertakes consultancy and research in the fields of interactive design, intelligent textiles, and architecture, as well as product design for global clients within a wide array of industries ranging from industrial production to fashion and infrastructure planning.

== Selected projects ==
=== The CREATIF ===
The CREATIF project is based on the use of smart fabrics. The aim of the project is to design and develop software and a smart fabric printer that can print electronic materials containing inks with interactive capabilities. The consortium consists of three creative partners (Diffus Design, Base Structures, and Zaha Hadid Architects).

=== Light.Touch.Matters ===
Light.Touch.Matters (LTM) is a cooperation between product designers, material scientists, and industry. LTM plans to create smart materials that can sense touch and movement, and respond with light. The base technologies for the LTM. project are piezo plastics and flexible OLEDs.

=== The Climate Dress ===
The Climate Dress was designed in 2009 in collaboration with the Swiss embroidery company Forster-Rohner, the Alexandra Institute, and the Danish School of Design. It is laced with hundreds of LEDs that respond to the level of carbon dioxide in the nearby surroundings and are powered through the conductive embroidery by an Arduino Lily pad microprocessor and a carbon dioxide detector, resulting in patterns that range from slow pulses to rapid flashes depending on the concentration of CO_{2}. The Climate Dress does not rely on wiring, soldering, or crimping, which is often the case with smart textile products. All functional elements are blended into the embroidery and exposed to the viewer.

=== Solar Handbag ===
The Solar Handbag was designed in 2011 in collaboration with the Alexandra Institute and Center for Software Innovation. It has 100 silicon solar cells that collect daytime sunlight and thus generate two watts of usable energy enough to charge a mobile device. The handbag also features a set of interior optical fibers that glow to assist the user in their search for objects in the handbag. The solar cells have been woven into conductive embroidery on the exterior surface of the handbag, which transmits the harvested energy into a rechargeable lithium-ion battery.
