= Wedding dress of Princess Alice of the United Kingdom =

Dress worn by Princess Alice at her wedding to Prince Louis of Hesse in 1862

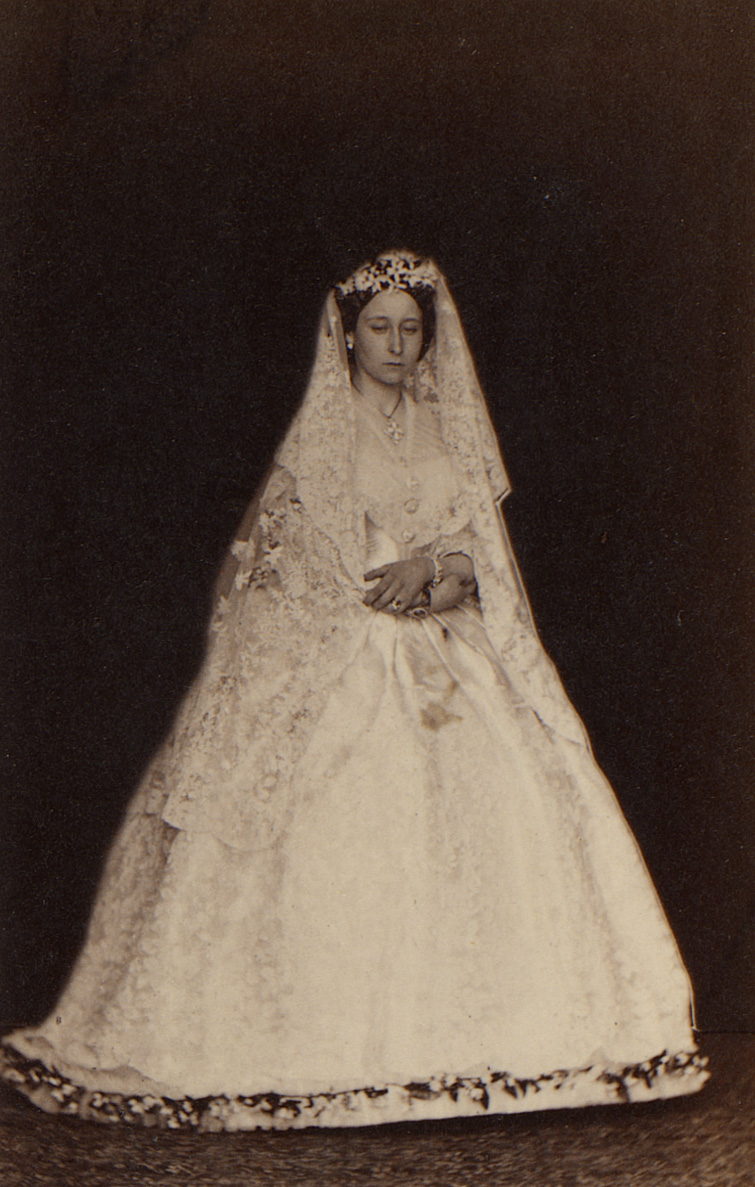

The wedding dress of Princess Alice of the United Kingdom was worn during a period of court mourning for the death of her father.

Princess Alice was the second daughter of Queen Victoria and Prince Albert. On 1 July 1862, in the dining room of Osborne House on the Isle of Wight, she married Prince Louis of Hesse. Seven months had passed since the death of the Prince Consort and the Royal Family was still in deep mourning. The venue was chosen so that the Queen would be able to avoid inviting the usual guests of state.

From "The Royal Wedding Dresses" by Nigel Arch and Joanna Marschner (p. 58): "She wore a 'half-high dress with a deep flounce of Honiton lace, a veil of the same and a wreath of orange blossom and myrtle'." It was a simple style and not embellished with a court train. Queen Victoria later confided to her daughter, the Princess Royal (Vicky), that the wedding of 'poor Alice' had been "more like a funeral."

== See also ==
- List of individual dresses
