= Pink Ralph Lauren dress of Gwyneth Paltrow =

Dress worn by Gwyneth Paltrow to the 71st Academy Awards in 1999

- Designer: Ralph Lauren
- Year: 1999
- Type: Pink dress

Oscar-nominated actress Gwyneth Paltrow wore the pink dress—designed by Ralph Lauren—to the 71st Academy Awards on March 21, 1999, at the Dorothy Chandler Pavilion in Los Angeles. The dress received mixed reviews, and the style was compared to that of the actress Grace Kelly. The dress was widely copied after the event, and Paltrow was credited for bringing pink back into fashion. While wearing the dress, Paltrow won an Academy Award for Best Actress that night for her portrayal in Shakespeare in Love.

== Design ==
The soft pink gown designed by Ralph Lauren was made of taffeta, and has a relatively simple design. The dress has a long, wide skirt and a bodice with straps and V-shaped neckline; a scarf of the same color was tied to it. Ralph Lauren adapted the dress from a pink taffeta skirt that actress Paltrow wanted to wear from a Ralph Lauren lookbook.

With her dress, Paltrow wore pink Manolo Blahnik strappy sandals and Harry Winston jewelry: a diamond necklace, bracelet and earrings valued at around $160,000. Her father, Bruce Paltrow, purchased the jewelry for her as a present after she won the Academy Award for Best Actress. Gwyneth Paltrow later wore the jewelry, in her father's memory, at her 2018 wedding to Brad Falchuk.

The actress was accompanied to the event by her parents. Paltrow received an Academy Award for Best Actress for her portrayal of Viola De Lesseps in the film Shakespeare in Love.

== Reception ==
Fashion critics were initially divided in opinion regarding Paltrow's choice of dress. TV Guide observed that one critic described the actress as "a Barbie doll wrapped in a satin ribbon". One commentator called it "incongruous with the current fashion", but "suitable Gwyneth Paltrow". The actress revived the fashion of pale pink and her selection of Ralph Lauren proved to be well received by the public and was widely emulated. An owner of a teen apparel boutique in Westport, Connecticut remarked, "The year before, I wouldn't have even looked at anything pink. It would have reminded my customers of when they were little girls. Paltrow made the color cool. And Paltrow's Oscar dress turned into the number one prom dress style of the year thanks to ABS and Allen Schwartz, who is famous for making low-priced copies of Oscar dresses."

== See also ==
- List of individual dresses
