= Hervé L. Leroux =

French fashion designer (1957–2017)

- Born: Hervé Peugnet; 30 May 1957; Bapaume, France
- Died: 6 October 2017 (aged 60)
- Education: École nationale supérieure des Beaux-Arts
- Occupation: Fashion designer
- Years active: 1978–2017
- Known for: Founder of Hervé Léger; Bandage dress

Hervé L. Leroux (French pronunciation: [ɛʁve ɛl ləʁu]; 30 May 1957 – 6 October 2017) was a French fashion designer and founder of the Hervé Léger fashion house.

== Biography ==
Leroux was born Hervé Peugnet on 30 May 1957 in Bapaume, in northern France. One of three children, he excelled in art in school, leaving his hometown at age 18 to study sculpture in Paris at the École nationale supérieure des Beaux-Arts.

Leroux died on 6 October 2017, aged 60.

== Early career ==
After leaving art school, Leroux turned to hairdressing, qualifying as a hairstylist with Jean-Marc Maniatis. His first show was doing hair backstage at Chloé. From there, beginning in 1978, he began making hats and bags. After creating some hats for a Tan Giudicelli show, he was invited to work on a handful of dresses, an initial taste of dressmaking that led Giudicelli to suggest he drop hairstyling and turn his energies to clothes. In 1980, he met Karl Lagerfeld and, three days later, was hired to work as his assistant, initially at Fendi in Rome for two years, and then at Chanel, in Paris, where he was senior assistant designer for their first two ready-to-wear collections.

After Chanel, he went out on his own in 1985, setting up a small studio and store on Rue du Pélican near the Palais-Royal in central Paris, making dresses and hats. He also began a series of consultancies, working as a freelance haute couture designer at Lanvin under the direction of Maryll Lanvin, at Diane Von Furstenberg, designing accessories at newly launched Daniel Swarovski and shoes at Charles Jourdan.

He founded his own label Hervé Léger in 1985, creating the bandage dresses that the label would be known for in 1990. Writing in the International Herald Tribune, fashion critic Suzy Menkes described one of these early collections as "a recipe for the Nineties". Leroux "molded his fabric to the female form, rather than draping and cutting it." Though various designers have staked a claim as to who did the bandage dresses first, and Leroux often pointed out that in the modern era the late American couturier Charles James set the standard, he also took a far longer view of any attribution, telling style.com, "Bands belong to history. They come from Cleopatra, Queen of the Egyptians."

In the late 1990s, he lost control of his company Hervé Léger and the commercial use of the name in 1999.

== Becoming Hervé L. Leroux ==
The "Léger" name was itself Lagerfeld's suggestion, on the grounds that "Peugnet" would be too difficult for Americans to pronounce. After Leroux lost the rights to it, Lagerfeld again proposed a new name: "He told me, 'Call yourself Leroux because your hair is red – not as red as it was, because you are older – but anyway it works, and everyone will know who you are.'" Leroux founded his own independently-financed couture house, Hervé L. Leroux, delivering his first dresses for spring 2000. The design studio and store were, and still are, located at 32 rue Jacob in the heart of Paris' Left Bank, in the former boutique and store of the late famed antique dealer and decorator Madeleine Castaing, a location and enterprise he dubbed "the smallest couture shop in the world." There Leroux developed a new concept of made-to-measure jersey dresses created by hand.

== Style ==
As creative director of Paris-based house Guy Laroche from 2004 to 2006, he dressed Hilary Swank for her 2005 Oscar appearance in a backless midnight-blue jersey dress. In 2007, the firm branched into ready-to-wear.

In November 2012, Leroux teamed with the NYC based, boutique fragrance brand Joya to create a candle which comes in a matte black glass container cut on a slant to mimic a bias drape.

== Theater work ==
- 1995 – Designed stage costumes for Zizi Jeanmaire for her show with the Ballet de Marseille, directed by Roland Petit, in Marseille, Paris and Toulon.
- 1995 – Costumes for the ballet "Camera Obscura" directed by Roland Petit at the Opéra de Paris.
- 1997 – Costumes for the ballet "Le Lac des Cygnes" (Swan Lake) directed by Roland Petit in Marseille.
