= Wedding dress of Princess Louise of Wales =

Dress worn by Princess Louise at her wedding to Alexander Duff, 1st Duke of Fife in 1889

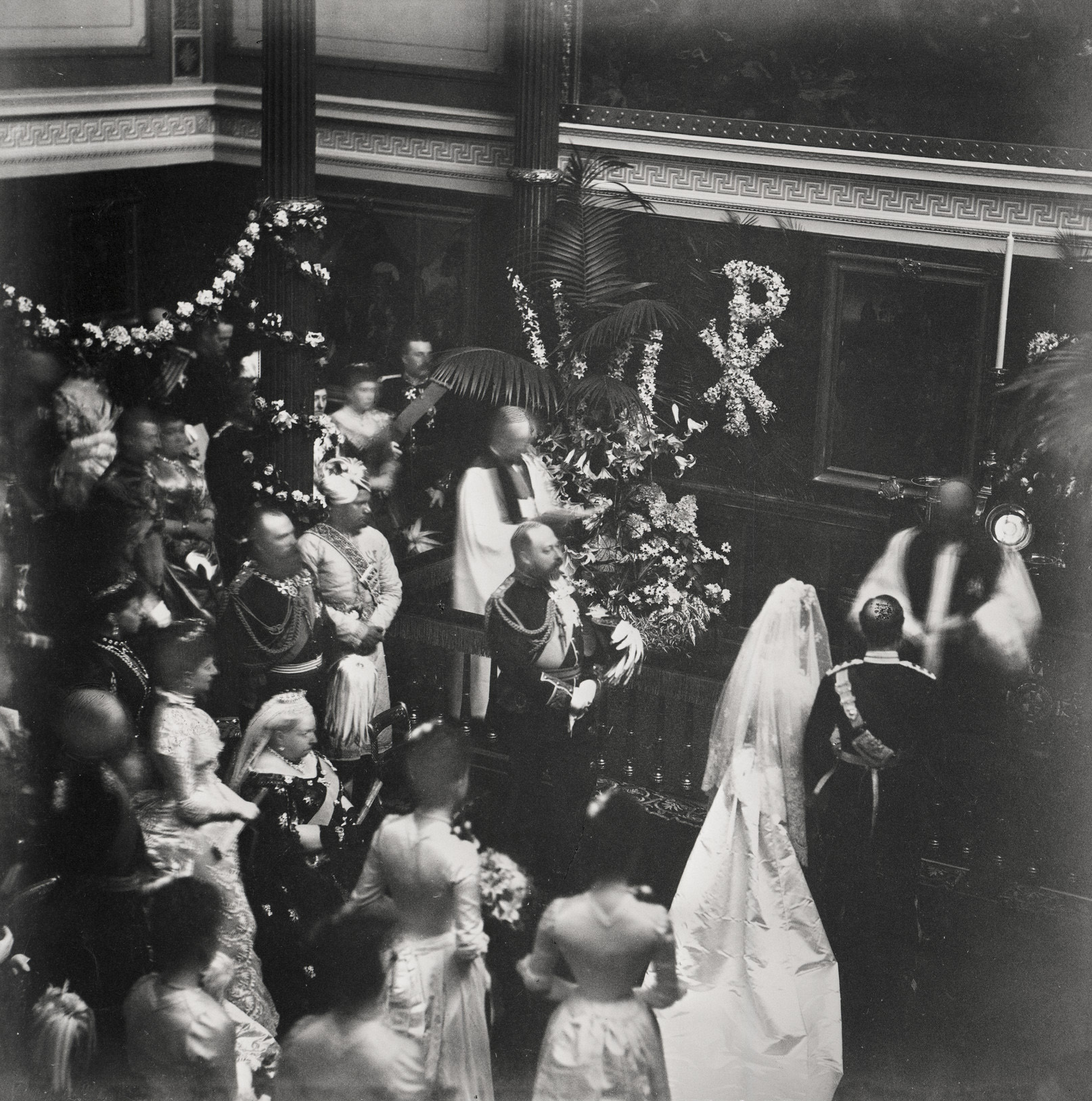
Princess Louise and the Duke of Fife during their marriage ceremony in Buckingham Palace, 1889.

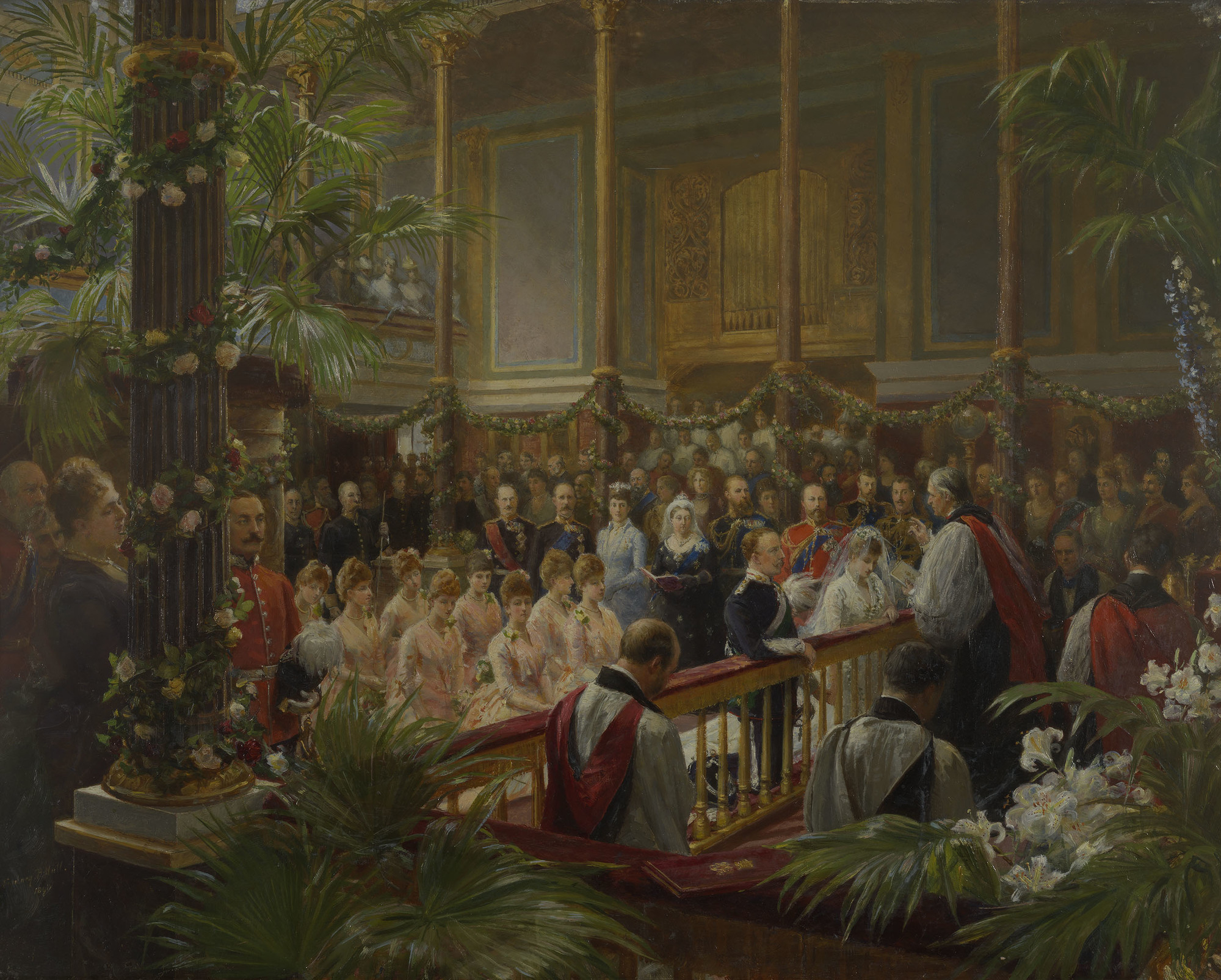
The wedding of Princess Louise and the Duke of Fife in an 1890 painting by Sydney Prior Hall.

On the event of her wedding to Alexander Duff, Earl of Fife (later 1st Duke of Fife) at the Private Chapel of Buckingham Palace in London on 27 July, 1889, Princess Louise of Wales wore a wedding dress of white satin, trimmed with lace and orange flowers with a bridal veil. The dress was distinguished by a high v-shaped Medici collar. Louise carried a bouquet of orange flowers. The author of the report of the wedding in the Court Circular column of The Times wrote that "In truth, there is here little room for description other than technical, since every bride has the appearance of a vision of pure white". Louise's bridesmaids wore simple pink dresses with knots of roses in their hair.

== See also ==
- List of individual dresses
