= Wedding dress of Princess Louise of the United Kingdom =

Dress worn by Princess Louise at her wedding to John Campbell in 1871

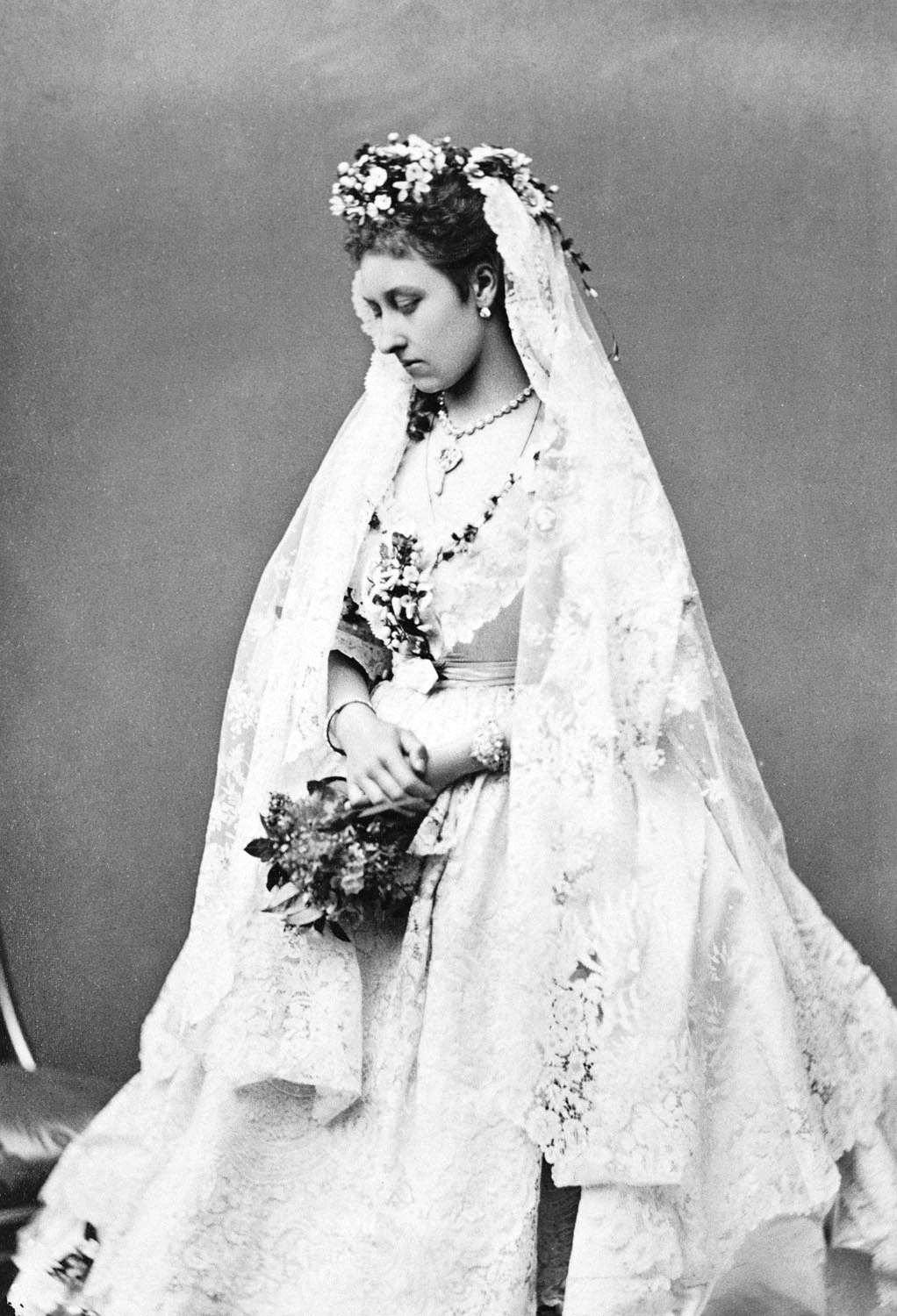
- Designer: The Princess Louise
- Year: 1871
- Type: White bridal dress
- Material: Spitalfields white silk satin with Honiton lace

The wedding dress of Princess Louise, Queen Victoria's sixth child and fourth daughter, was worn by her at her wedding to John Campbell, Marquess of Lorne, the heir-apparent to the 8th Duke of Argyll, on 21 March 1871 at St. George’s Chapel, Windsor Castle.

Louise wore a white silk wedding gown, heavily decorated with national and royal symbols, with deep flounces of flower-strewn Honiton lace. A short bridal veil of Honiton lace that she designed herself was held in place by two diamond daisy hair pins which had been presented by her siblings, Princes Arthur and Leopold and Princess Beatrice. The hair pins were supplied by Garrard.

The tulip brooches are now the property of Princess Michael of Kent, whose husband received them as a legacy from his mother Princess Marina, who may have received them from Princess Louise as a gift.

A bracelet was a present from her fiancé. The centre could be worn as a pendant ornament, with a large and fine sapphire mounted with brilliants and pearls and pearl drop. Princess Louise wore this pendant on a diamond necklace on her wedding day, and it can be seen in her wedding photographs. It was also supplied by Garrard.

== See also ==
- List of individual dresses

== Notes ==
- The Illustrated London News, Volume 58, pp. 282–283
