= Wedding dress of Princess Beatrice of the United Kingdom =

Dress worn by Princess Beatrice at her wedding to Prince Henry of Battenberg in 1885

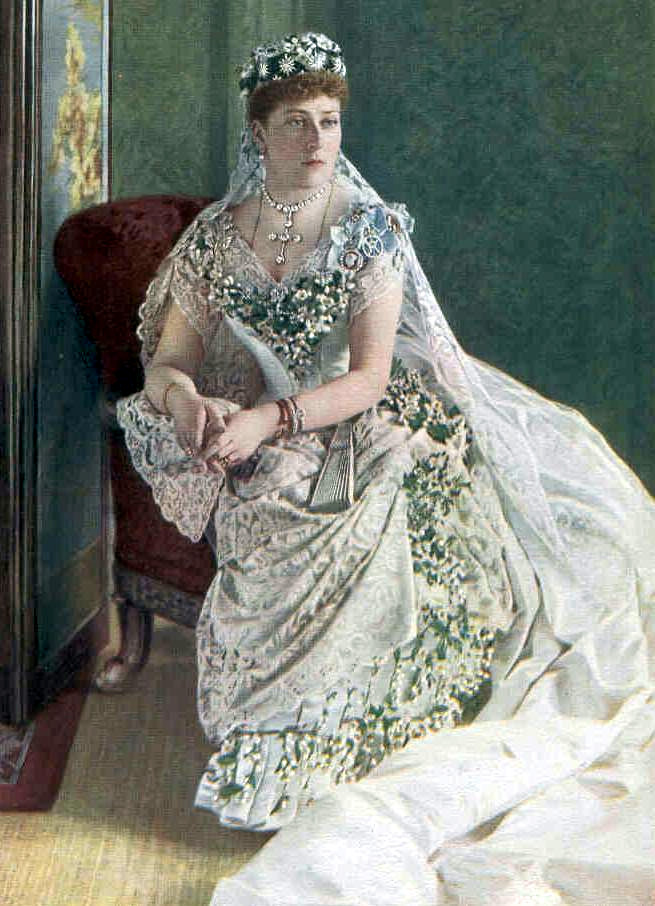
Princess Beatrice in her wedding dress, Osborne, 1885. Beatrice wore her mother's wedding veil of Honiton lace.

On the event of her wedding to Prince Henry of Battenberg at Saint Mildred's Church at Whippingham, near Osborne, on 23 July 1885, Princess Beatrice of the United Kingdom wore a wedding dress of white satin, trimmed with orange blossom and lace, the lace overskirt held by bouquets of the blossom entwined with white heather. There was lace on the pointed neck line, and on the sleeves, for the Princess was a lover of, and an expert on, lace. One of her most treasured possessions was a tunic of old point d'Alençon which had belonged to Catherine of Aragon. Knowing her daughter's love of lace, Queen Victoria allowed Princess Beatrice to wear the Honiton lace and veil which she herself had worn on her wedding day. It was a very precious possession to the Queen, and Princess Beatrice was the only one of her daughters to be given the opportunity to wear it. Her veil was emblazoned with a diamond circlet with diamond stars, a wedding gift from her mother.

She was accompanied by ten royal bridesmaids dressed in ivory gowns.

St. Mildred's in Whippingham, where the couple was married, has a replica of the wedding dress worn by Princess Beatrice which, along with photographs from the wedding, can be viewed by visitors.

== See also ==
- List of individual dresses
