= Wedding dress of Princess Alexandra of Denmark =

Wedding dress worn by Alexandra in 1863

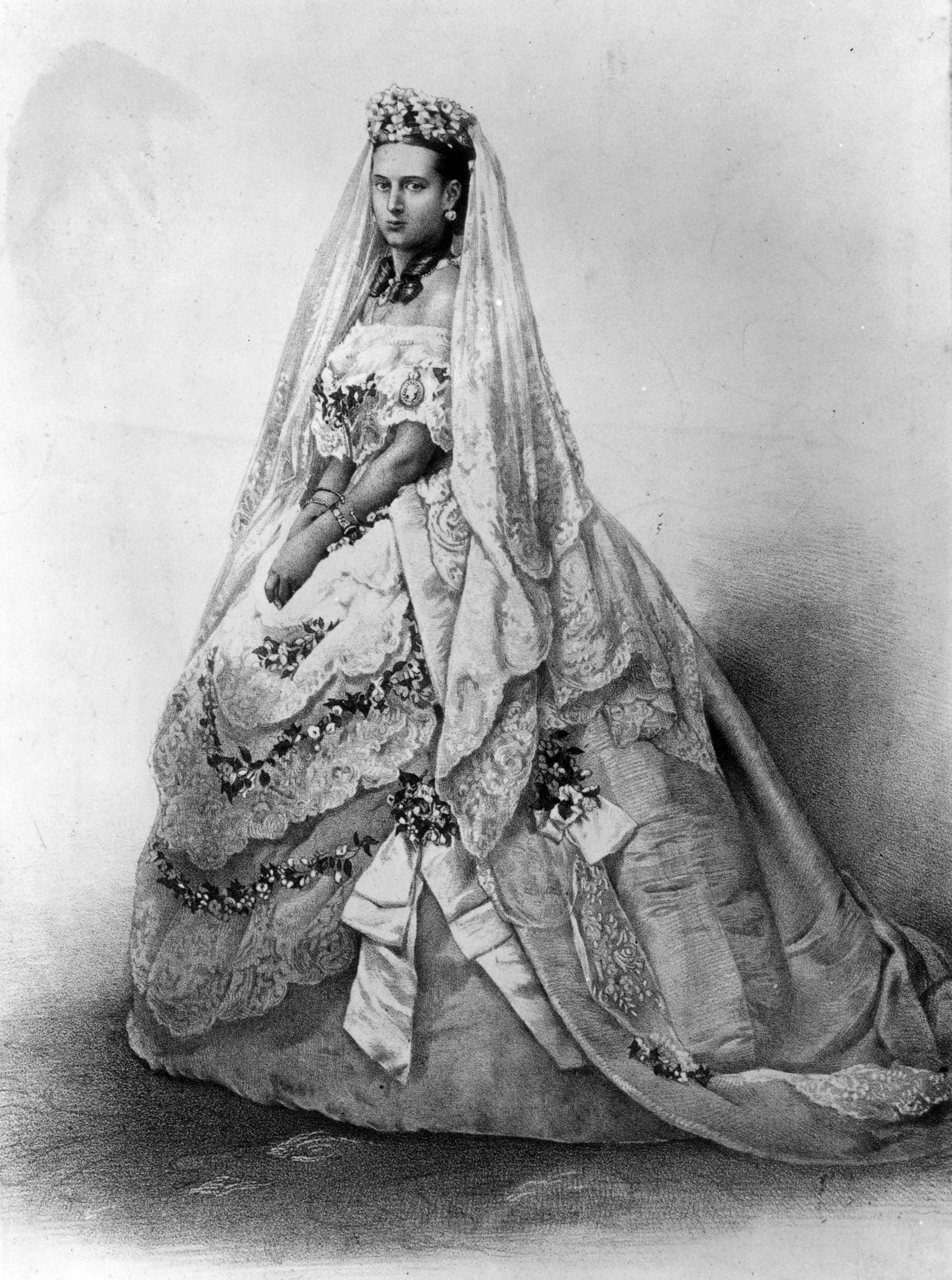
- Artist: Mrs. James of Belgravia (dress); Miss Tucker (lace design); Messrs. John Tucker & Co (lace)
- Year: 1863

The wedding dress of Princess Alexandra of Denmark (the future Queen Alexandra) was worn at her wedding to Albert Edward, Prince of Wales (King Edward VII from 1901 to 1910) on 10 March 1863 in St George's Chapel, Windsor Castle. It was the first in British royal history to be photographed while being worn. The gown was made by London dressmaker Mrs James of Belgravia. It is now part of the British Royal Collection. In 2011, the dress was part of a display of royal wedding dresses at Kensington Palace.

== Design ==
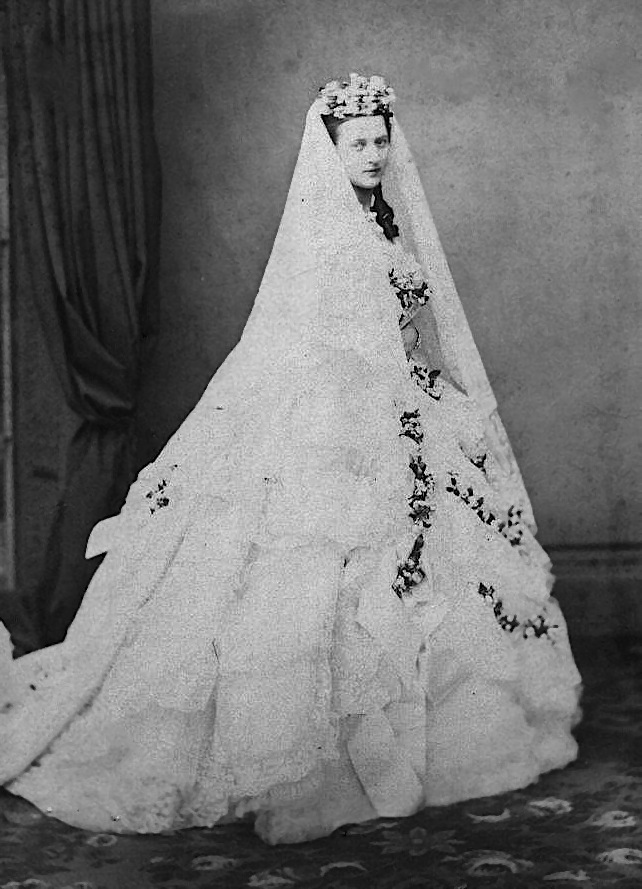
Princess Alexandra of Denmark, in her wedding dress (10 March 1863)

The dress was made of white silk satin (the silk was woven at Spitalfields) trimmed with orange blossoms, myrtle, puffs of tulle and Honiton lace. It had a similarly trimmed 21-foot (6.4 m) silver moiré train, which was carried by eight young ladies aged 15 to 20. The four lace flounces were designed by Miss Tucker and executed by Messrs. John Tucker and Co. of Branscombe, near Sidmouth. A matching lace veil, train trimming and handkerchief were also made. The pattern of the lace depicted cornucopias filled with English roses, Irish shamrocks and Scottish thistles.

Princess Alexandra wore a wreath of orange blossoms and myrtle and carried a bouquet of orange blossoms, white rosebuds, lily of the valley, orchids, and myrtle. Her jewelry consisted of a pearl necklace, earrings and brooch given to her by the Prince of Wales, an opal and diamond bracelet from Queen Victoria, a diamond bracelet given by the ladies of Leeds, and an opal and diamond bracelet from the ladies of Manchester.

== Attendants ==
The bridesmaids wore white glacé silk dresses trimmed with tulle netting and roses, and wreaths of roses.

== See also ==
- List of individual dresses
