= Wedding dress of Princess Louise Margaret of Prussia =

Dress worn by Princess Louise Margaret of Prussia at her wedding to Prince Arthur in 1879

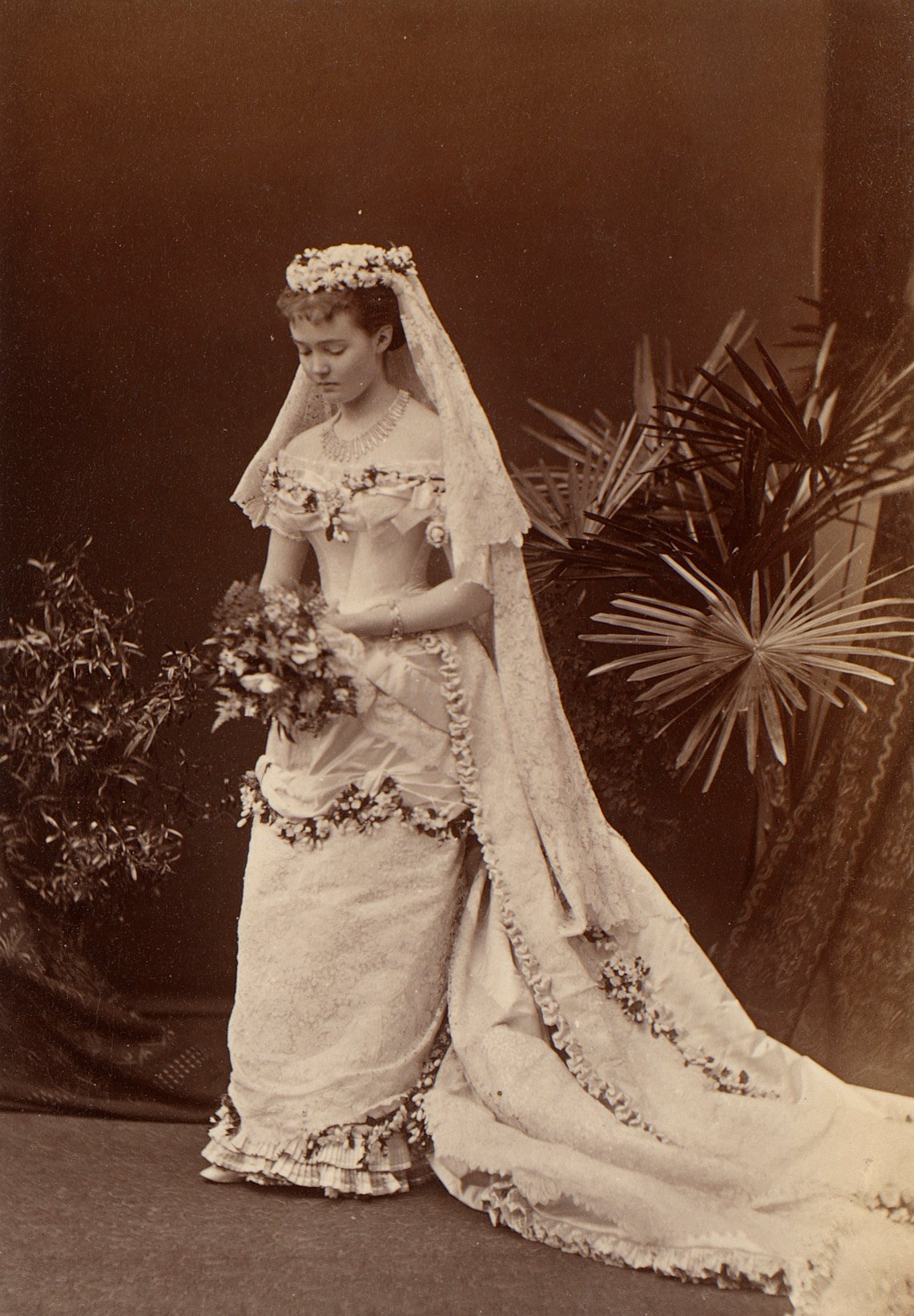
- Princess Louise Margaret of Prussia, later the Duchess of Connaught (1860-1917) in her wedding dress.
- Year: 1879
- Material: White satin and lace

The wedding dress of Princess Louise Margaret of Prussia was worn by her at her wedding to Prince Arthur, Duke of Connaught and Strathearn, at St. George's Chapel, Windsor, on 13 March 1879. Prince Arthur was the seventh child and third son of Queen Victoria and Prince Albert of Saxe-Coburg and Gotha.

== Description ==
The bride wore a heavy white satin dress, with a band of lace ten centimeters wide encircling the waist. The skirt was sewn with lace 30 centimetres (12 in) wide and decorated with myrtle-leaves, the emblem in Germany of the bridal state. The train was 4 metres (13 ft) long and surmounted by a lace flounce one meter in width made in Silesia, in which a sprig of myrtle was fixed. The bridal veil was about 3 metres (9.8 ft) square, made of point d'Alençon lace, the design representing orange blossoms, roses, and myrtle-leaves intertwined.

The veil was fastened to her hair with five diamond stars, the gift of the bridegroom. The handkerchief was made of the same material as the veil and showed the same design, one corner being embellished with the princess's monogram, the other with a Prussian eagle. The Princess carried a bouquet of white flowers.

The bridesmaids wore dresses of white satin duchesse, faille and mousseline de soie, embroidered with wild rosebuds and foliage: the flowers representing England, Scotland, Ireland and Germany.

== See also ==
- List of individual dresses
