= Wedding dress of Princess Victoria Mary of Teck =

Dress worn by Princess Victoria Mary of Teck at her wedding to Prince George in 1893

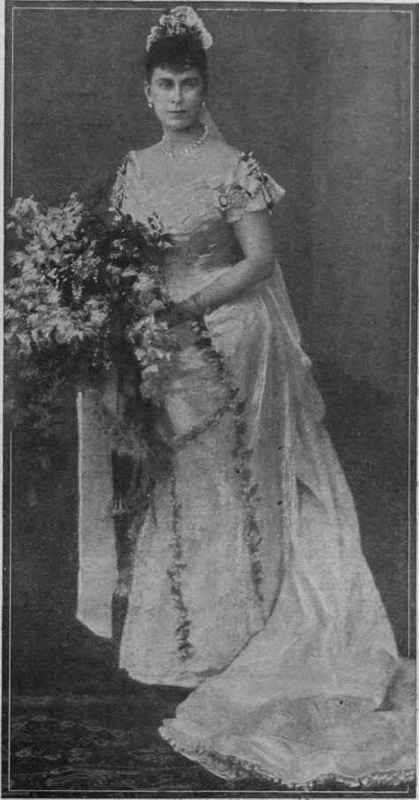
- Artist: Linton & Curtis; Arthur Silver
- Year: 1893

The wedding dress of Princess Victoria Mary of Teck is the gown worn by the future Queen Mary at her wedding to Prince George, Duke of York (King George V from 1910 to 1936) on 6 July 1893 at the Chapel Royal, St. James's Palace, in London. The dress now belongs to the British Royal Collection and is part of a collection of royal wedding dresses at Kensington Palace in London.

== Background ==
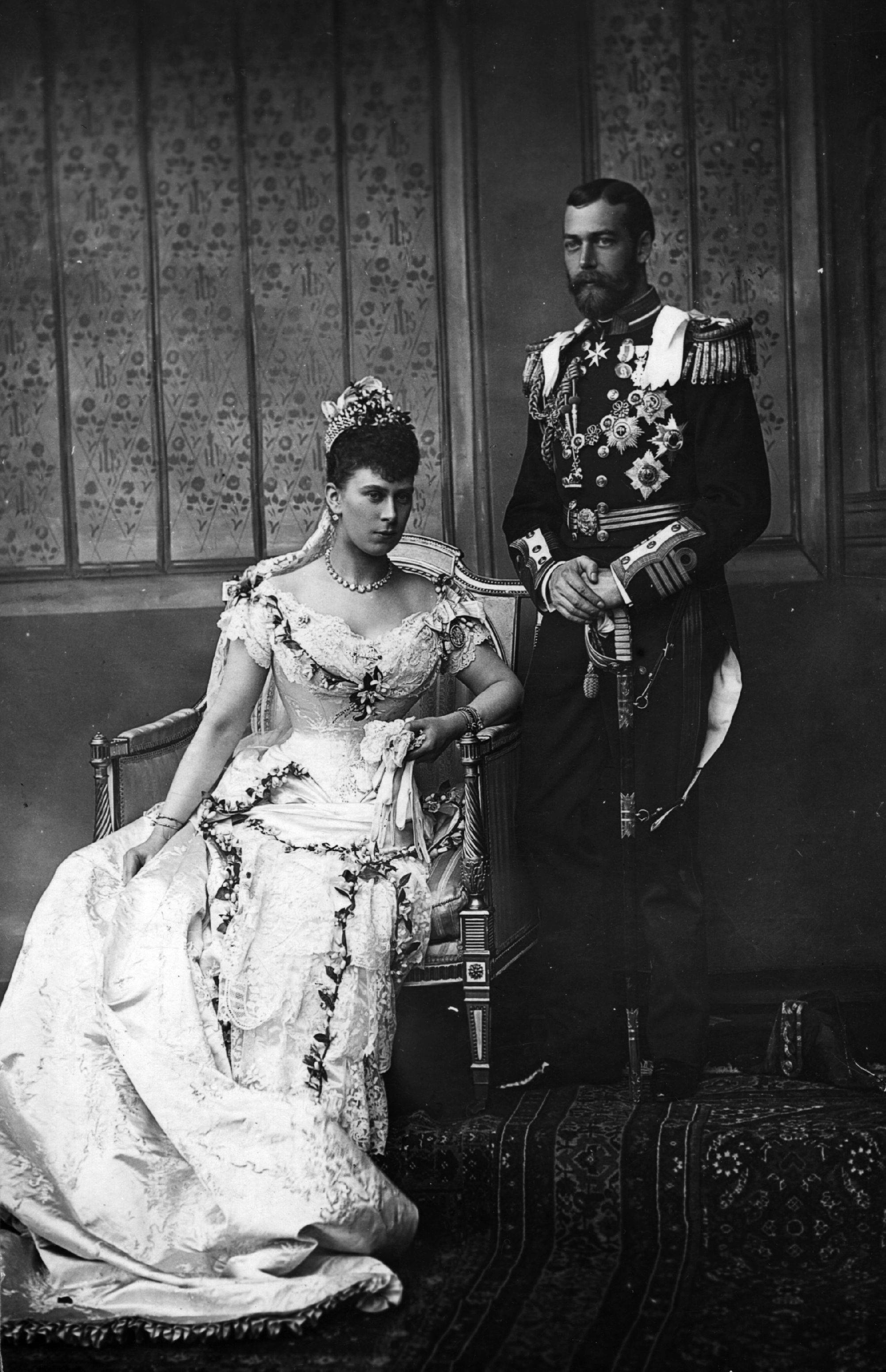
Princess Victoria Mary of Teck at her wedding to Prince George, Duke of York

In 1891, the bride's mother, the Duchess of Teck, had declared that her daughter's wedding dress and those of her bridesmaids would be manufactured entirely in Britain. This was likely because the Duchess was president of the Ladies' National Silk Association. Upon the announcement of the engagement of Princess May (as she was usually known) to Prince George, Duke of York in the spring of 1893, Arthur Silver (of the Silver Studio), was approached to design the gown. Silver had designed the dress for Princess May's intended wedding to George's older brother, Prince Albert Victor, Duke of Clarence and Avondale, in 1892. This 'Lily of the Valley' creation had been made public just days before the Duke of Clarence's untimely death in January 1892 but had to be completely abandoned. The design chosen for the York-Teck wedding was 'The May Silks'; the dress would feature embroidery of the emblems of a rose, shamrock and thistle, and be trimmed with the traditional orange blossom and true lovers knots. Silver, renowned for his Art Nouveau designs, was also said to be much influenced by Japanese art in his design. In March 1893, the Duchess and Princess visited the Warner & Sons' factory at Hollybush Gardens in Spitalfields, London and commissioned them to make the finest white silk with silver thread by Albert Parchment in time for the July wedding.

== Design ==
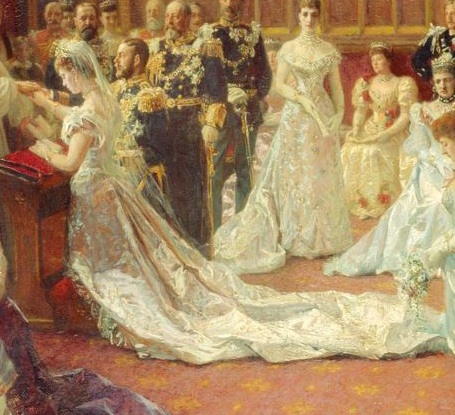
Painting by Laurits Tuxen

The dress itself was put together by Linton and Curtis of Albemarle Street. The front of the dress was made of white satin, featuring three small flounces old Honiton lace which had been used on the wedding dress of her mother. The bodice, cut at the throat, was long and pointed and was made of Silver's white and silver brocade, also featuring a small amount of her mother's Honiton lace near the top and on the upper part of the sleeve. The rich satin manteau de cour fell from her shoulders. The train was long and plain (although The Times reported there was none) and the veil of her mother's which she wore was also made of Honiton lace, fastened by diamond pins given as a gift from Queen Victoria. Matching the orange blossom elements to the dress, small wreaths were placed around the bust and on the hair. Princess Mary completed the wedding outfit with a diamond tiara from Queen Victoria; a diamond rivière necklace from the Prince and Princess of Wales and diamond earrings and anchor brooch, a wedding gift from Prince George. Out of all of the wedding toilette, the veil was reportedly the only piece that was not worn again after the wedding.

"It is to the strains of the Bridal march from Lohengrin that Princess Mary enters. the observed of all observers in the most literal sense. With downcast eyes and a flush on her cheeks she looks exquisitely pretty. Her dress of silver and white brocade with its ingeniously clustered shamrocks, roses and thistles is at once simple and elegant. There is no train, or at all events, none that hampers the bride's movement, while a plain court bodice shows off her finely-moulded figure to perfection. The bridal veil of fine old Honiton point is caught back off the face, and trails and clusters of orange blossoms, together with the inevitable bouquet of white flowers carried in her hand, complete the salient points of the bride's appearance." Observation of The Times, 8 July 1893.

The official painters of the royal wedding were Heinrich von Angeli, Laurits Tuxen, and Luke Fildes.

== See also ==
- List of individual dresses
