= Wedding dress of Camilla Parker Bowles =

Dress worn by Camilla Parker Bowles at her wedding to Prince Charles in 2005

For her wedding to Charles, Prince of Wales (King Charles III since 2022) on 9 April 2005 at Windsor Guildhall, Camilla Parker Bowles's wedding dress was a cream silk chiffon dress hemmed with vertical rows of Swiss-made appliqued woven disks, and a matching oyster silk basket weave coat. She completed the outfit with pale beige suede shoes with almond-coloured toes designed by L.K.Bennett, a Philip Treacy wide-brimmed cream-coloured straw hat overlaid with ivory French lace and feathers, and a purse made from embossed calf leather with a half flap closing and suede lining, from Launer's "East/West" collection. Work on the outfit began on 21 February 2005, and the final fitting was made on 5 April. Camilla later rewore the outfit with a different hat and set of shoes at the opening of the National Assembly for Wales in June 2007. She wore the outfit again during a visit to the Italian Parliament in 2025. For this occasion, the outfit was modified by its original designer Anna Valentine, with additional embroidery by The King's Foundation artisan Beth Somerville.

For the blessing at St George's Chapel, Windsor Castle, Camilla wore a floor-length embroidered pale blue and gold coat over a matching chiffon dress and a dramatic spray of golden feathers in her hair. Both ensembles were by Antonia Robinson and Anna Valentine, London designers who worked under the name Robinson Valentine, now solely called Anna Valentine. They reportedly wanted a "crisp clean look with subtle detailing" for the dress. The golden feathers were designed by Philip Treacy.

== See also ==
- Wedding of Prince Charles and Camilla Parker Bowles
- List of individual dresses
