= Robinson Valentine =

British luxury fashion house

- Type: Fashion Design
- Founders: Antonia Robinson; Anna Valentine

Robinson Valentine, was a British luxury fashion house launched in 1986. It was founded by designer duo Antonia Robinson and Anna Valentine. In 2005 Valentine became the sole name on the label, now known as Anna Valentine.

The pair began working under the name "Robinson Valentine." Robinson and Valentine met at a college in Hammersmith while taking a pattern-cutting course. After completing the course, they approached the Enterprise Allowance Scheme which helped them open a small shop in Wandsworth. After becoming successful, they opened a much larger shop in Kensington.

== Notable clients ==
Robinson Valentine designed clothes for celebrities, socialites, the aristocracy and the British royal family. The label notably designed the wedding dress of Camilla Parker Bowles, which she wore at her wedding to the Prince of Wales (Later King Charles III) in 2005. Other clients have included Serena Armstrong-Jones, Viscountess Linley, Patti Palmer-Tomkinson, Lady Sarah Chatto, Laura Lopes, Jemima Khan, Saffron Aldridge and Sheherazade Goldsmith.

== In the media ==
In 2005, Robinson Valentine received widespread and instant publicity when it was announced the label would be designing the wedding dress of Camilla Parker Bowles. They were interviewed by The Daily Telegraph, Hello! magazine and numerous media outlets. Robinson Valentine was praised by fashion critics for Camilla's choice of dress and design. Camilla continues to wear outfits by the label to high-profile events which is often highlighted in the media.

== Robinson's departure ==
Antonia Robinson, who now uses her married name, Antonia Shields, departed from the label and moved to Cornwall where she set up antoniaspearls.co.uk.
