= Wedding of Prince Charles and Camilla Parker Bowles =

2005 British royal wedding

- Combined coat of arms of the Prince of Wales and the Duchess of Cornwall
- Date: 9 April 2005; 21 years ago
- Venue: Windsor Guildhall; St George's Chapel, Windsor Castle
- Location: Windsor, Berkshire, England
- Participants: Charles, Prince of Wales (later King Charles III); Camilla Parker Bowles (later Queen Camilla)

The wedding of Prince Charles and Camilla Parker Bowles (later King Charles III and Queen Camilla) took place on 9 April 2005 in a civil ceremony at the Windsor Guildhall, Windsor, Berkshire, England. The civil marriage ceremony, conducted in the presence of the couple's families, was followed by a Church of England (CofE) Service of Prayer and Dedication at St George's Chapel within Windsor Castle. The groom's parents, Queen Elizabeth II and Prince Philip, Duke of Edinburgh, did not attend the civil marriage ceremony at the Guildhall; they were present at the Service of Prayer and Dedication in St George's Chapel, and held a reception for the couple within Windsor Castle afterwards.

The marriage formalised the long-term romantic relationship between Charles and Camilla; she became known as 'Her Royal Highness The Duchess of Cornwall'. Whilst no media was permitted during the civil marriage ceremony at Windsor Guildhall, the proceedings of the Service of Prayer and Dedication were covered by BBC television and radio. Notable figures in attendance included international political, religious, and royal figures, as well as various celebrities. The wedding was described by media outlets as: "A Fairy Tale for Grown-Ups" and "A 30-year love affair survived scandals".

== Engagement and preparations ==
Charles, Prince of Wales, and Camilla Shand (later Parker Bowles) met and had a romantic relationship in the early 1970s, maintaining intermittent romances during their respective first marriages. Prince Charles publicly acknowledged his extramarital affair with Parker Bowles in a 1994 television interview. Their relationship received intense media attention and criticism, and the public debated for years whether Charles should be allowed to marry Camilla.

On 10 February 2005, it was announced that Charles, Prince of Wales and Camilla Parker Bowles, would marry on 8 April 2005, at Windsor Castle with a civil ceremony followed by religious prayer. A portrait of the couple posed at the entryway to Birkhall was later released to mark their engagement. The Privy Council met on 2 March 2005 to give effect to the Queen's consent to the marriage, in conformance with the provisions of the Royal Marriages Act 1772. The Government of the United Kingdom indicated that the marriage was not morganatic. After the engagement announcement, the couple were congratulated by Queen Elizabeth II and her husband, the Duke of Edinburgh. Princes William and Harry said they are "very happy" and wish the couple "all the luck in the future". The Archbishop of Canterbury, Rowan Williams, issued a statement which read: "These arrangements have my strong support and are consistent with Church of England guidelines concerning remarriage which the Prince of Wales fully accepts as a committed Anglican and as prospective Supreme Governor of the Church of England." Prime Minister Tony Blair, Leader of the Opposition Michael Howard, Leader of the Liberal Democrats Charles Kennedy, Leader of the House of Commons Peter Hain, and the Prime Ministers of the other Commonwealth realms added their congratulations.

The Duchess' engagement ring was a Windsor family heirloom which had belonged to Queen Elizabeth the Queen Mother. It has a 1920s platinum setting, and it is composed of a square-cut central diamond flanked by six diamond baguettes

=== Civil ceremony ===
A civil ceremony was chosen when the Archbishop of Canterbury refused permission to the couple to marry in church, due to opposition to the marriage within the Anglican church. Although Camilla Parker Bowles had divorced her first husband in 1995, the marriage of a divorced person whose ex-spouse is still living has been possible in the Church of England, at the discretion of the member of clergy conducting the ceremony, since 2002.

When Anne, Princess Royal married Timothy Laurence after having divorced Mark Phillips, she did so in the Church of Scotland. The remarriage of divorcés is not controversial in the Church of Scotland, which does not view marriage as a sacrament, and the sovereign has no constitutional role in the governance of the Church. Charles and Camilla did not elect this course of action.

=== Questioning a royal civil wedding ===
Charles is the first member of the royal family to marry in a civil ceremony in England. Stephen Cretney, a Fellow at All Souls College, Oxford, questioned whether Charles and Camilla could marry in a civil ceremony, as the Royal Family was specifically excluded from the law which instituted civil marriages in England (Marriage Act 1836). On 14 February, the BBC's Panorama uncovered documents of official legislative research advice dating from 1956 and 1964, which stated that it was not lawful for members of the royal family to marry in a civil ceremony in England and Wales, though it would be lawful in Scotland. These documents' statements were dismissed in a statement published by Clarence House on the advice of four unnamed legal experts. It took the view that the 1836 Act had been repealed by the Marriage Act 1949.

In the newspaper The Times on 22 February 2005, the lawyer David Pannick wrote: "It is difficult to understand how the happy couple can marry in a civil marriage ceremony, as they intend, without causing a right royal nullity ... Section 79(5) of the 1949 Act still prevents a civil ceremony."

The first lawyer to put his name to a contrary view was Lord Falconer of Thoroton, Secretary of State for Constitutional Affairs and Lord Chancellor, who made the following statement in the House of Lords on 24 February:

The Government are satisfied that it is lawful for the Prince of Wales and Mrs Parker-Bowles, like anyone else, to marry by a civil ceremony in accordance with Part III of the Marriage Act 1949. Civil marriages were introduced in England, by the Marriage Act 1836. Section 45 said that the Act "... shall not extend to the marriage of any of the Royal Family". But the provisions on civil marriage in the 1836 Act were repealed by the Marriage Act 1949. All remaining parts of the 1836 Act, including Section 45, were repealed by the Registration Service Act 1953. No part of the 1836 Act therefore remains on the statute book. ... We are aware that different views have been taken in the past; but we consider that these were overcautious, and we are clear that the interpretation I have set out in this Statement is correct. We also note that the Human Rights Act has since 2000 required legislation to be interpreted wherever possible in a way that is compatible with the right to marry (Article 12) and with the right to enjoy that right without discrimination (Article 14). This, in our view, puts the modern meaning of the 1949 Act beyond doubt.

This argument was rejected by the law professor Rebecca Probert. She noted that the 1949 Act nowhere refers to "ancient procedures" but to the preservation of existing "law". As the heading indicates, Section 79 is a "saving". The purpose of a "saving" is to make specific provision for the continuance of an old law which would otherwise be abrogated by a new law.

The government raised the issue of the Human Rights Act, noting that under this the 1949 Act had to be interpreted wherever possible to uphold the right to marry without discrimination. The key words are "wherever possible" – the Human Rights Act specifically states that where a statute makes something illegal the only way to make it legal is to amend or repeal the statute. For example, were the Sovereign to deny a member permission to marry under the Royal Marriages Act, an application to the Court for a declaration that the marriage must be permitted to go ahead under human rights legislation would fail.

Eleven objections were received by the Cirencester and Chippenham register offices but were all rejected by the Registrar General (and National Statistician) Len Cook, who determined that a civil marriage would in fact be valid.

=== Change of the wedding venue and date ===
On 17 February, Clarence House announced the marriage's change of venue from Windsor Castle to the Windsor Guildhall, immediately outside the walls of the castle. This substitution came about when it was discovered that the legal requirements for licensing the royal castle for civil weddings would require opening it up to other prospective couples for at least three years. On 22 February, Buckingham Palace announced that the Queen would not attend the wedding ceremony, but would attend the church blessing and host the reception afterwards. The reason stated by the palace was the couple wanted to keep the occasion low key. On 4 April, it was announced that the wedding would be postponed 24 hours until 9 April, so that the Prince of Wales could attend the funeral of Pope John Paul II as the representative of the Queen. The postponement also allowed some of the dignitaries who were invited to the funeral to attend the wedding. In keeping with tradition, the Prince of Wales spent the night apart from his bride-to-be at Highgrove House, his country home in Gloucestershire, with his sons Princes William and Harry, while Camilla remained at Clarence House.

== Wedding and Service of Prayer and Dedication ==
External videos
- The televised Service of Prayer and Dedication (YouTube video)

The wedding took place at the Windsor Guildhall at 12:30pm BST (11:30 UTC) on Saturday 9 April 2005. Crowds had gathered on the streets since dawn ahead of the service. The ceremony was attended by senior members of the royal family apart from the Queen and the Duke of Edinburgh.

At the wedding, the couple's witnesses were Prince William and Tom Parker Bowles, sons of the groom and bride respectively. In keeping with tradition, the couple's wedding rings are crafted from 22 carat Welsh gold from the Clogau St David's mine in Bontddu. The tradition of using Clogau Gold within the wedding rings of the Royal Family dates back to 1923. The design of the wedding rings is by Wartski, a London jeweller that has held a royal warrant to the King (until 2022 as the Prince of Wales) since 1979. The King wears his on the pinky finger of his left hand.

The civil wedding was followed by a televised blessing, officially termed a Service of Prayer and Dedication by both the Prince of Wales's office and the press. in the afternoon at St George's Chapel, Windsor Castle. This was attended by 800 guests and all the senior members of the royal family, including the Queen and the Duke of Edinburgh, and led by the Archbishop of Canterbury, Rowan Williams. During this ceremony Charles and Camilla joined the congregation in reading "the strongest act of penitence from the 1662 Book of Common Prayer", widely quoted in press reports of the wedding:

We acknowledge and bewail our manifold sins and wickedness, Which we, from time to time, most grievously have committed, by thought, word and deed, Against thy Divine Majesty, Provoking most justly thy wrath and indignation against us.

The arrangements for the wedding and service were strongly supported by the Archbishop of Canterbury as "consistent with the Church of England guidelines concerning remarriage". The "strongly-worded" act of penitence recited by the couple was a confessional prayer written by Thomas Cranmer, Archbishop of Canterbury to King Henry VIII. It was interpreted as a confession by both, of past sins, albeit without specific reference and going "some way towards acknowledging concerns" over their past misdemeanours.

For the wedding, the Duchess wore a cream-coloured dress and coat with a wide-brimmed cream-coloured hat. For the Service of Prayer and Dedication afterward, she wore a floor-length embroidered pale blue and gold coat over a matching chiffon dress and a dramatic spray of golden feathers in her hair. Both ensembles were by Antonia Robinson and Anna Valentine, London designers who worked under the name Robinson Valentine, now solely called Anna Valentine; both hats were made by the Irish milliner Philip Treacy. The Duchess's flower bouquet contained daffodils, jasmine, Lily of the Valley, pink and cream lilies, camellias, hydrangeas, and roses which came from the Prince of Wales Highgrove House gardens. Charles and all male members of the royal family wore morning dress. The wedding cake was made by Dawn Blunden of the Sophisticake cake shop in Woodhall Spa, Lincolnshire. In April 2005, a hotelier paid £215 in an internet auction for a slice of the cake.

Following the service of blessing, the couple greeted the people (approximately 20,000) who had lined outside the chapel.The party then moved to Windsor Castle's State Apartments where the Queen hosted a reception for a number of guests. Queen Elizabeth II toasted the couple at the reception, hailing her son for overcoming "terrible obstacles" and "is home and dry with the woman he loves". According to the BBC, Charles made five toasts at the reception, including to his wife Camilla and his father-in-law. The couple later went to Birkhall on the Balmoral Estate for their honeymoon.

The official photographer of the wedding was Hugo Burnand.

== Public and commercial interest ==
Manufacturers of pottery and other commemorative items faced a late rush to change the dates on their products after the delayed wedding date became known. However, sales of those with the incorrect date soared when people began to think that they would become collector's items.

Coins and stamps were unveiled by Royal Mint and Royal Mail respectively to mark the wedding. A cut-price replica of Camilla's diamond engagement ring went on sale at a British supermarket and immediately became the chain's fastest selling jewellery item. For the wedding day, the theme park Alton Towers changed the name of their rollercoaster Rita: Queen of Speed to "Camilla: Queen of Speed". Television commercials and signs around the park were all updated to reflect this change.

The BBC gained the rights to broadcast the event where there was live coverage of the Service of Prayer and Dedication from St George's Chapel. On BBC One, Dermot Murnaghan and Sophie Raworth presented the live coverage of the event and fashion advisors Trinny Woodall and Susannah Constantine contributed as the contemporary social commentators. The BBC had around thirty cameras at the event and shared footage with broadcasters throughout the world. BBC News 24 also had coverage during the day with Jane Hill and Simon McCoy reporting live from Windsor. The BBC reported an average audience of 7.3 million.

Many self-described fans of Diana, Princess of Wales opposed the wedding of Charles and Camilla Parker Bowles, with some referring to the event as "Black Thursday" and writing to national newspapers to express their disapproval.

== Wedding guest list ==
According to a list released by the office of Prince Charles:

=== Family of the Prince of Wales ===
- The Prince of Wales' sons:
  - Prince William of Wales, the groom's son
  - Prince Henry of Wales, the groom's son
- The Princess Royal and Rear Admiral Timothy Laurence, the groom's sister and brother-in-law
  - Peter Phillips, the groom's nephew
  - Zara Phillips, the groom's niece
- The Duke of York, the groom's brother
  - Princess Beatrice of York, the groom's niece
  - Princess Eugenie of York, the groom's niece
- The Earl and Countess of Wessex, the groom's brother and sister-in-law
- The Princess Margaret, Countess of Snowdon's family:
  - Viscount and Viscountess Linley, the groom's first cousin and his wife
  - Lady Sarah and Daniel Chatto, the groom's first cousin and her husband
- Princess Alexandra, The Hon. Lady Ogilvy, the groom's first cousin, once removed

=== Family of Camilla Parker Bowles ===
- Major Bruce Shand, the bride's father
  - Camilla Parker Bowles' children and their partners:
    - Tom Parker Bowles and Sara Buys, the bride's son and his fiancée
    - Laura Parker Bowles and Harry Lopes, the bride's daughter and her partner
  - Annabel and Simon Elliot, the bride's sister and her husband
    - Ben Elliot, the bride's nephew
    - Alice and Luke Irwin, the bride's niece and her husband
    - Katie Elliot, the bride's niece
  - Mark Shand, the bride's brother

== Service of Prayer and Dedication guest list ==
According to official Prince of Wales press package (page 15):

=== Members of the British Royal Family ===
- The Queen and the Duke of Edinburgh – the groom's parents
  - The Prince of Wales' sons:
    - Prince William of Wales
    - Prince Henry of Wales
  - The Princess Royal and Rear Admiral Timothy Laurence – the groom's sister and brother-in-law
    - Peter Phillips – the groom's nephew
    - Zara Phillips – the groom's niece
  - The Duke of York – the groom's brother
    - Princess Beatrice of York – the groom's niece
    - Princess Eugenie of York – the groom's niece
  - The Earl and Countess of Wessex – the groom's brother and sister-in-law
- The Princess Margaret, Countess of Snowdon's family:
  - Viscount and Viscountess Linley – the groom's first cousin and his wife
  - Lady Sarah and Daniel Chatto – the groom's first cousin and her husband
- The Duke and Duchess of Gloucester – the groom's first cousin, once removed, and his wife
- The Duke and Duchess of Kent – the groom's first cousin, once removed, and his wife
- Princess Alexandra, The Hon. Lady Ogilvy – the groom's first cousin, once removed
  - James and Julia Ogilvy – the groom's second cousin and his wife
- Prince and Princess Michael of Kent – the groom's first cousin, once removed, and his wife

=== Viceroys ===
- The Governor-General of Antigua and Barbuda and Lady Carlisle
- The Governor-General of Australia and Mrs. Jeffery
- The Governor-General of Barbados and Mrs. Husbands
- The Governor-General of Canada and John Ralston Saul
- The Queen's Representative in the Cook Islands and Lady Goodwin
- The Governor-General of Grenada and Lady Williams
- The Commonwealth Secretary-General and Clare de Lore
- The Governor-General of New Zealand and Peter Cartwright
- The Governor-General of Papua New Guinea and Lady Matane
- The Governor-General of St. Kitts and Nevis

=== Foreign royalty ===
==== Members of reigning royal families ====
- – The King of Bahrain
- – Prince Constantijn and Princess Laurentien of the Netherlands (representing the Queen of the Netherlands)
- – The Crown Prince and Crown Princess of Norway (representing the King of Norway)
- – Prince Turki bin Faisal Al Saud and Princess Nouf of Saudi Arabia (representing the King of Saudi Arabia)
- – Prince Bandar bin Sultan of Saudi Arabia

==== Members of non-reigning royal families ====
- – King Constantine II and Queen Anne-Marie of Greece
- – Princess Margareta and Prince Radu of Romania
- (Socialist Federal Republic of Yugoslavia) –Crown Prince Alexander and Crown Princess Katherine of Yugoslavia

=== Religious representatives ===
- The Archbishop of Canterbury and Dr Williams
- The Lord and Lady Carey of Clifton
- The Dean of Windsor and wife
- Canon Doctor Hueston Finlay and wife
- Canon Laurence Gunner and wife
- Canon John Ovenden and Christine Ovenden
- Rev Canon John White

=== British politicians ===
- The Prime Minister of the United Kingdom and Mrs. Blair
- The Leader of the Opposition and Mrs. Howard
- The Leader of the Liberal Democrats and Mrs. Kennedy
- The First Minister of Scotland and Mrs. McConnell
- The First Minister for Wales and Mrs. Morgan
- The Secretary of State for Northern Ireland

=== Other notable guests ===
- Andrew Parker Bowles, and Rosemary Parker Bowles – the bride's first husband and his second wife
- Lord and Lady Romsey – the groom's second cousin and his wife
- Stephen Fry – broadcaster
- Christopher Warren-Green – conductor
- David Frost – broadcaster
- Edward Fox – actor and Joanna David
- Gordon Hunt – musician
- Jilly Cooper – novelist
- Joan Rivers – comic
- Joanna Lumley – actress and ambassador for Prince's Trust
- Jonathan Dimbleby – British presenter
- Martina Milburn – chief executive of the Prince's Trust
- Lord Bragg – broadcaster and author
- Nicholas Soames – shadow defence secretary, grandson of former prime minister Winston Churchill
- Paddy Campbell – fashion designer
- Philip Treacy – milliner
- Prunella Scales – actress
- Richard E. Grant – actor
- Robert Harris – author
- Ronald Harwood – playwright
- Rowan Atkinson – actor
- Sanjeev Bhaskar – actor and comedian
- Simon Sebag Montefiore – biographer, novelist, and journalist
- Sir Stephen Lamport – former private secretary to the prince
- Timothy West – actor
- Trudie Styler – actor and producer
- Valentino Garavani – fashion designer
- William Shawcross – writer and broadcaster
- William Rees-Mogg – former editor of The Times
- Staff from Clarence House, Highgrove House, Birkhall, and Sandringham House
