= Alix Jennings =

Painter

- Born: Alix Thomson; 1884; Carlisle, England
- Died: 1980 (aged 95–96)
- Known for: Oil painting
- Notable work: Portrait of T. E. Lawrence at Jesus College

Alix Jennings (1884–1980) was a British artist, who specialised in portrait, animal and flower painting using oils. Her works are in the collections of the Museum of the Order of St John, Windsor & Royal Borough Museum and at Jesus College, Oxford.

Born Alix Thomson in Carlisle in 1884, she exhibited works at the Royal Academy's Summer Exhibition on several occasions, including: Good Deeds ("Everyman") (1927); White Blossom (1938); Phlox (1941). Her flower paintings were often exhibited at the Chelsea Flower Show. Her portrait of T. E. Lawrence, closely inspired by a portrait by Augustus John, was commissioned by Jesus College as its official memorial to Lawrence.
