= Hugo Burnand =

British photographer

- Born: 1963 or 1964 (age 62–63); Cannes, Alpes-Maritimes, France
- Education: Cheam School; Harrow School
- Occupation: Photographer
- Spouse: Louisa Halifax (m. 1993)
- Children: 4
- Relatives: Admiral Sir David Hallifax (father-in-law)

Hugo Burnand (born 1963/1964) is a French-born British photographer of high society and aristocracy. He was the official photographer for the wedding of Prince Charles and Camilla Parker Bowles, the wedding of Prince William and Catherine Middleton, and the coronation of Charles III and Camilla.

== Early life and family ==
Burnand was born in Cannes in the Alpes-Maritimes region of southern France. His mother, Susan Gordon, was killed in a car crash a year after his birth and he was subsequently raised by Ursy Burnand, his step-mother. Ursy is a photographer who encouraged Hugo in photography, and continues to assist him in his work. He attended Cheam School and Harrow School. He received a camera for his seventh birthday and won his first photography contest during his time at Cheam School.

Burnand has been married to Louisa Halifax, daughter of Admiral Sir David Hallifax since 1993. The couple have four children. One of Burnand's "most celebrated photographs" is of him and Louisa and their four children "piled naked on top of each other in a human pyramid".

== Career ==
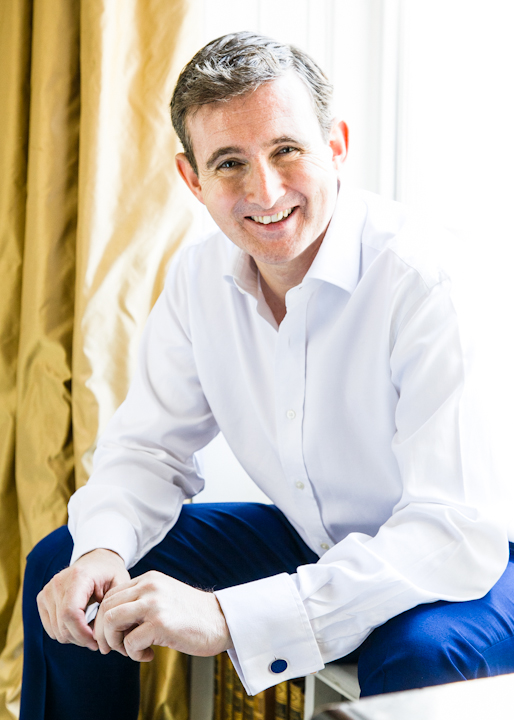
Burnand's photograph of furniture designer Tim Gosling, taken April 2012

Burnand became a professional photographer aged 27 and worked as the 'Bystander' photographer of high society for Tatler magazine for 20 years. During his time at Tatler he photographed Boy George and Margaret Thatcher, John F. Kennedy Jr. and Carolyn Bessette-Kennedy. Burnand asked Thatcher and her husband Denis to hold hands when he photographed them for their golden wedding anniversary. Burnand recalled that the couple reluctantly held hands as took four shots before Margaret said "That's enough of that".

Burnand said in a 2021 interview that the reason why he takes photographs and travels the world is that he "...really, really enjoy[s] it and want[s] to keep doing it" and that he tries "not to fuck it up".

=== Royal photography ===
Burnand was the official photographer for the wedding of Prince Charles and Camilla Parker Bowles in 2005. At the time Camilla emailed him to ask if he was available to take photographs for "a big date" she had coming up in April 2005, Burnand was on a six-month holiday with his family in South America and all his camera equipment had been stolen. In May 2024, he was granted a Royal Warrant for photography, granted by His Majesty King Charles III.

He subsequently started photographing Charles's sons, princes William and Harry and was chosen to be the official photographer for the wedding of Prince William and Catherine Middleton in 2011. Burnand prepared for three weeks prior to the wedding and lit the Throne Room of Buckingham Palace. He and his staff performed dress rehearsals with stopwatches to accurately plan the photography which had to be completed before a fly past at 1:30 pm. His mother gave out jelly beans to ensure the behaviour of the many children who were page boys and girls. Burnand and Catherine planned the staging of many of the photographs before the day of the wedding. Burnand's favourite photograph that he and Catherine planned was of William and Catherine with their page boys and girls. Burnand felt he may have been "subliminally" inspired by Franz Winterhalter's 1846 painting of Queen Victoria and her children.

Burnand took the official 60th birthday photograph of Prince Charles, inspired by James Tissot's 1870 portrait of the soldier and adventurer Frederick Burnaby.

In 2023 he was the official photographer for the coronation of Charles III and Camilla. In May 2024, it was announced that Burnand had has his Royal Warrant upheld, meaning that his business could bear the inscription ‘by appointment to His Majesty The King’.

=== Other work ===
Burnand helped establish a wildlife conservation charity to help preserve wildlife in Panama. His 2017 exhibition of photographs of indigenous tribes were displayed at the Victoria and Albert Museum.
