= Stephen Cretney =

British legal scholar (1936–2019)

Stephen Michael Cretney, FBA, Hon. QC (1936–2019) was a British legal scholar. He was Professor of Law at the University of Bristol from 1984 to 1993 and then a fellow of All Souls College, Oxford, until 2001.

== Life ==
Born on 25 February 1936, Cretney attended Magdalen College, Oxford, from 1956 to 1959.

After graduating, he trained as a solicitor at Macfarlanes and was admitted to the profession in 1962; two years later he became a partner in Macfarlanes. In 1966, he entered academia, becoming a lecturer in the Kenya School of Law. He moved to the University of Southampton in 1968 and then, in 1969, was elected to a fellowship at Exeter College, Oxford. He gave up his fellowship in 1978 to be a Law Commissioner for England and Wales, but returned to academia in 1984 to be Professor of Law at the University of Bristol, a chair he held until 1993 when he was elected a fellow of All Souls College, Oxford, retiring in 2001. Cretney died on 30 August 2019 and was survived by his wife Antonia (née Vanrenen) and their two sons.

== Honours and awards ==
Cretney was elected a Fellow of the British Academy in 1985 and was appointed an honorary Queen's Counsel in 1992. He was an academic bencher of the Inner Temple. The University of Bristol conferred on him an honorary LLD degree in 2007, and the University of Oxford awarded him the DCL higher doctorate in 1985.

== Royal marriage controversy ==
Interviewed on the BBC Panorama programme on 13 February 2005 Cretney argued that a civil wedding ceremony could not produce a valid marriage between the Prince of Wales and Camilla Parker-Bowles. It was inhibited for the same reason that Edward VIII could not marry Mrs Simpson while King, Princess Margaret could not marry Peter Townsend and Princess Anne had to marry Timothy Laurence in a Scottish church. Cretney pointed out that although the 1836 Marriage Act introduced provision for civil weddings, by section 45 it did not apply to the royal family. The Marriage Act 1949 (section 79(5)) confirmed the provision, and (although it repealed some parts of the previous Act) many of them (including section 45) remained in force. Civil marriage could have been extended to the royal family by repealing section 45 while the remaining provisions of the 1836 Act remained in force but this was not done. Rebutting Charles' claim (advanced by four legal experts who refused to give their names) that "the 1949 Act is not a continuation of the old legislation. It's a completely new act and therefore does not carry over the bar on royals having civil marriages" Cretney stated:

The 1949 Act is a Consolidation Act. A Consolidation Act does not change the law except in the most minor ways and all it does is to bring together the versions previously scattered amongst the large number of other acts.

He followed up with an article. He was supported ten days after the interview by David Pannick QC (as he then was), an administrative law expert who has overturned government interpretation of the law in court on many occasions, and a former attorney general, Sir Nicholas Lyell QC. Lecturing to the Family Law section of the Society of Legal Scholars in September 2006 Cretney warned of future legal challenges designed to prevent Mrs Parker-Bowles becoming Queen or inheriting from the royal family. A further article followed.

== Publications ==
- (Co-edited with Gerald Dworkin) Theobald on Wills (Sweet and Maxwell, 13th ed., 1970).
- Principles of Family Law (Sweet and Maxwell, 1974; 7th ed., 2002).
- Enduring Powers of Attorney: A Practitioner's Guide (Jordan, 1986).
- Elements of Family Law (Sweet and Maxwell, 1987).
- (Co-authored with Gwynn Davis and Jean Collins) Simple Quarrels: Negotiations and Adjudication in Divorce (Clarendon Press, 1994).
- (Co-authored with Roger Bird) Divorce—the New Law, (Family Law, 1996).
- Law, Law Reform and the Family (Oxford University Press, 1998).
- Family Law in the Twentieth Century: A History (Oxford University Press, 2003).
- Same Sex Relationships from 'Odious Crime' to 'Gay Marriage' (Oxford University Press, 2006).
