= Windsor and Royal Borough Museum =

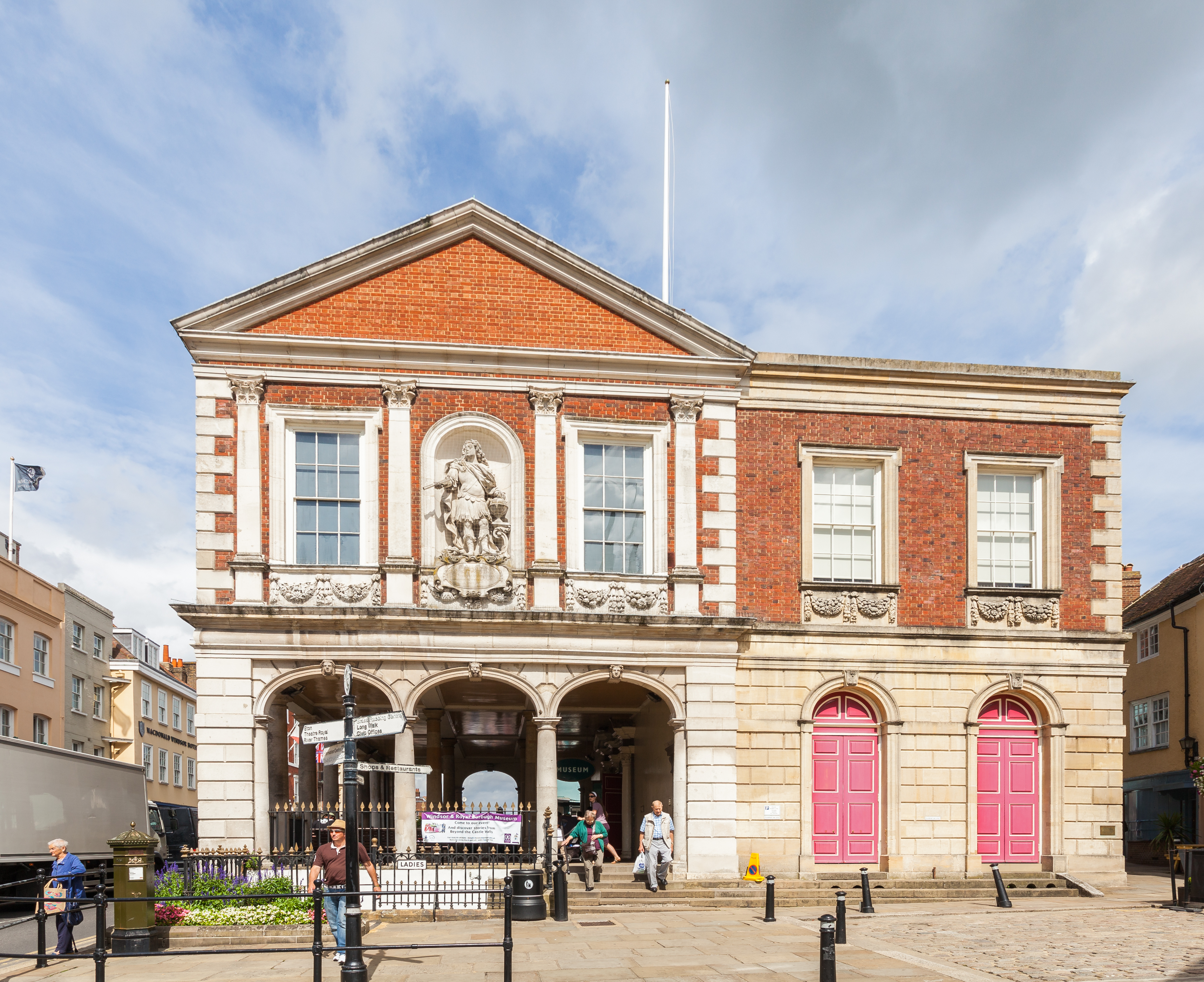
- Established: 1951
- Location: Windsor, Berkshire, England
- Coordinates: 51.482347°N 0.607168°W
- Type: Local museum
- Collection size: 13,500
- Website: windsormuseum.org.uk

Windsor and Royal Borough Museum is a local history museum, exploring the history of the town of Windsor and the Royal Borough of Windsor & Maidenhead, in the English county of Berkshire. It is accommodated within Windsor Guildhall which is a Grade I listed building. The museum is managed as part of the local authority of the Royal Borough of Windsor & Maidenhead.

The first museum exhibition was opened in Windsor Guildhall in 1951 as part of the Festival of Britain celebrations by Princess Elizabeth. The Queen returned to the building in 2011.

The art collection includes a work by Alix Jennings.
