= Wedding dress =

Dress worn by a bride during the wedding ceremony

A white wedding dress

A wedding dress or bridal gown is the dress worn by the bride during a wedding ceremony.

In Western culture, the wedding dress is most commonly white, a tradition popularised by elites in the Victorian era after Queen Victoria wore a white dress at her wedding to Prince Albert.

In Eastern cultures, such as Chinese and Indian cultures, brides will often wear red to their weddings to symbolize auspiciousness.

== History ==
=== Western culture ===
Historically, weddings have often symbolised a strategic union between families, businesses, kingdoms, or nations. Brides were expected to dress according to their status, with women from wealthy families donning rich colours and exclusive fabrics, such as furs, velvet, and silk. Brides from lower social strata wore their best church dress on their wedding day.

==== Color ====
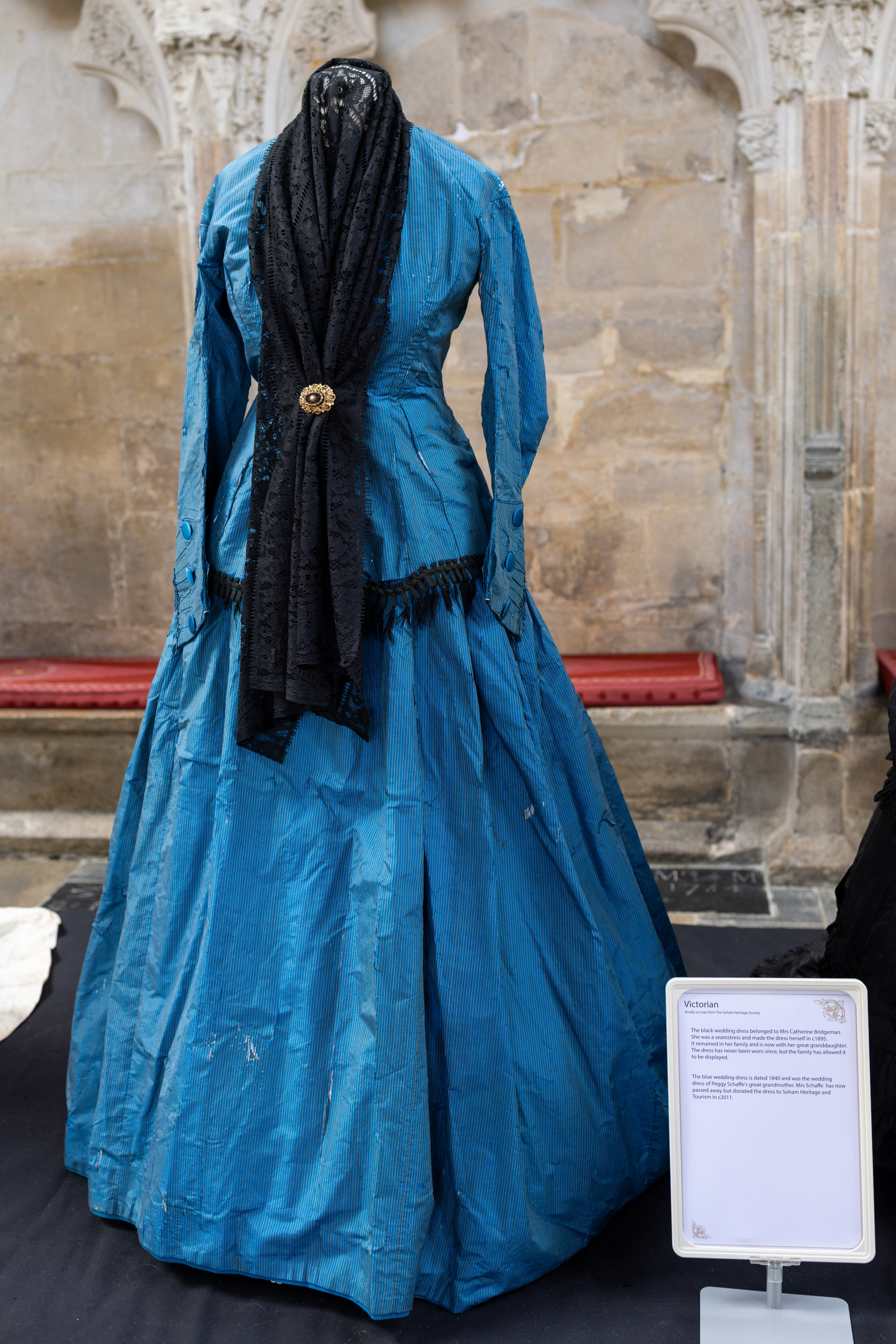
A blue wedding dress from 1840

Historically, there was no specific color for a bridal dress in the Western European upper class prior to the Victorian era. The wedding dress was simply the best dress the bride owned, and it need not be of a specific color. Since a wedding dress could be of any color, there were examples of white wedding dresses prior to the Victorian era. The first documented instance of a royal bride wearing a white wedding dress was that of Philippa of England. She wore a tunic with a cloak in white silk bordered with squirrel and ermine in 1406, when she married Eric of Pomerania. Similarly, Mary, Queen of Scots, wore a white wedding dress in 1559 when she married her first husband, Francis, the Dauphin of France.

This was not a widespread trend, however: prior to the Victorian era, a bride was married in any color, black being popular in Finland and the other Nordic countries, since a black dress could be worn as the best dress for any occasion after the wedding.

In the Empire period, white did become a popular color for wedding dresses in the European upper class. In 1816 the British dressmaker Eliza Gill published a white ball gown for wedding use and in 1818 the dressmaker Euphemia Macdonald pulished a white wedding dress in Ackermann’s, which has been referred to as the first white wedding dress designed specifically as a weddingdress. However, the popularity of the white wedding dress in the Empire period was mainly because white was the most popular color in Empire fashion rather than it having become a specific wedding color.

The white wedding dress gained popularity after the Queen Victoria's wedding in 1840 to Albert of Saxe-Coburg and Gotha, when Victoria wore a white gown trimmed with Honiton lace. Illustrations of the wedding were widely published, and many elite Victorian brides donned white dresses at their weddings.

In the early 1900s, clothing included a lot of decorations, such as lace or frills. This was also adopted in wedding dresses, where decorative frills and lace were common. For example, in the 1920s, they were typically short in the front with a longer train in the back and were worn with cloche-style wedding veils. This tendency to follow current fashions continued until the late 1960s, when it became popular to revert to long, full-skirted designs reminiscent of the Victorian era.

Since the mid-20th century, white has been the dominant color for Western wedding dresses, though "wedding white" includes shades such as eggshell, ecru, and ivory.

=== Eastern culture ===
Traditionally, a Kurdish first-time bride would wear a red dress for her wedding to symbolize the postcoital bleeding she will experience when she loses her virginity while a Kurdish bride who used to be married before would wear pink. Many Kurds associate red wedding dresses with impoverished Kurdish rural society and it is no longer commonly worn.

In India, brides wear a wedding sari. These are usually red with golden brocade, as red is the color associated with married women. Other colors appear in some regions and castes, like red-white checkering in Tamil Nadu.

== Gallery ==
=== Historical Western European wedding dresses ===
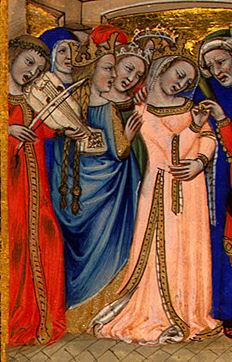
Detail from The Marriage by Nicolo da Bologna, 1350s.

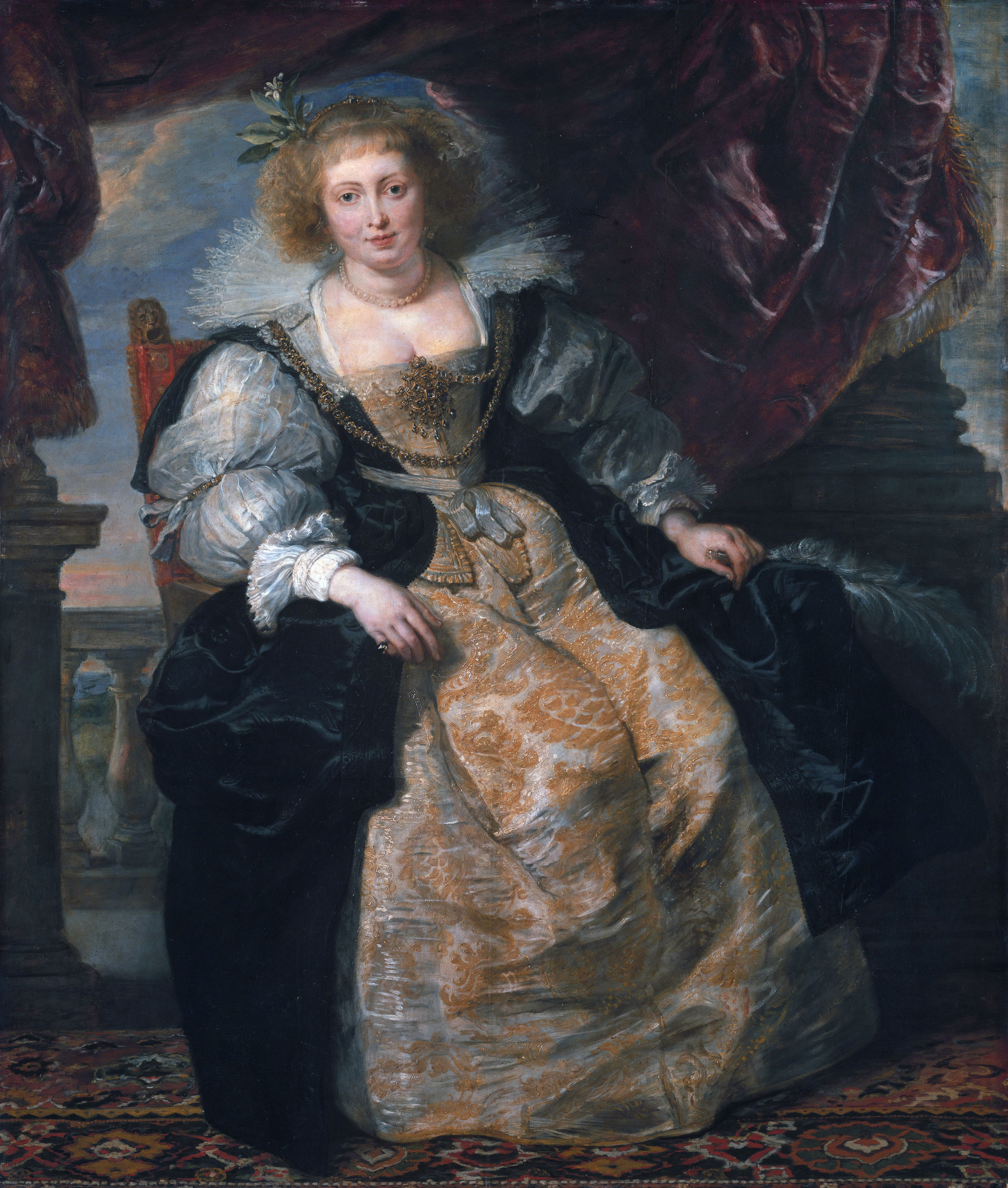
Helena Fourment, second wife of Peter Paul Rubens, painted by Rubens in her wedding dress, 1630.

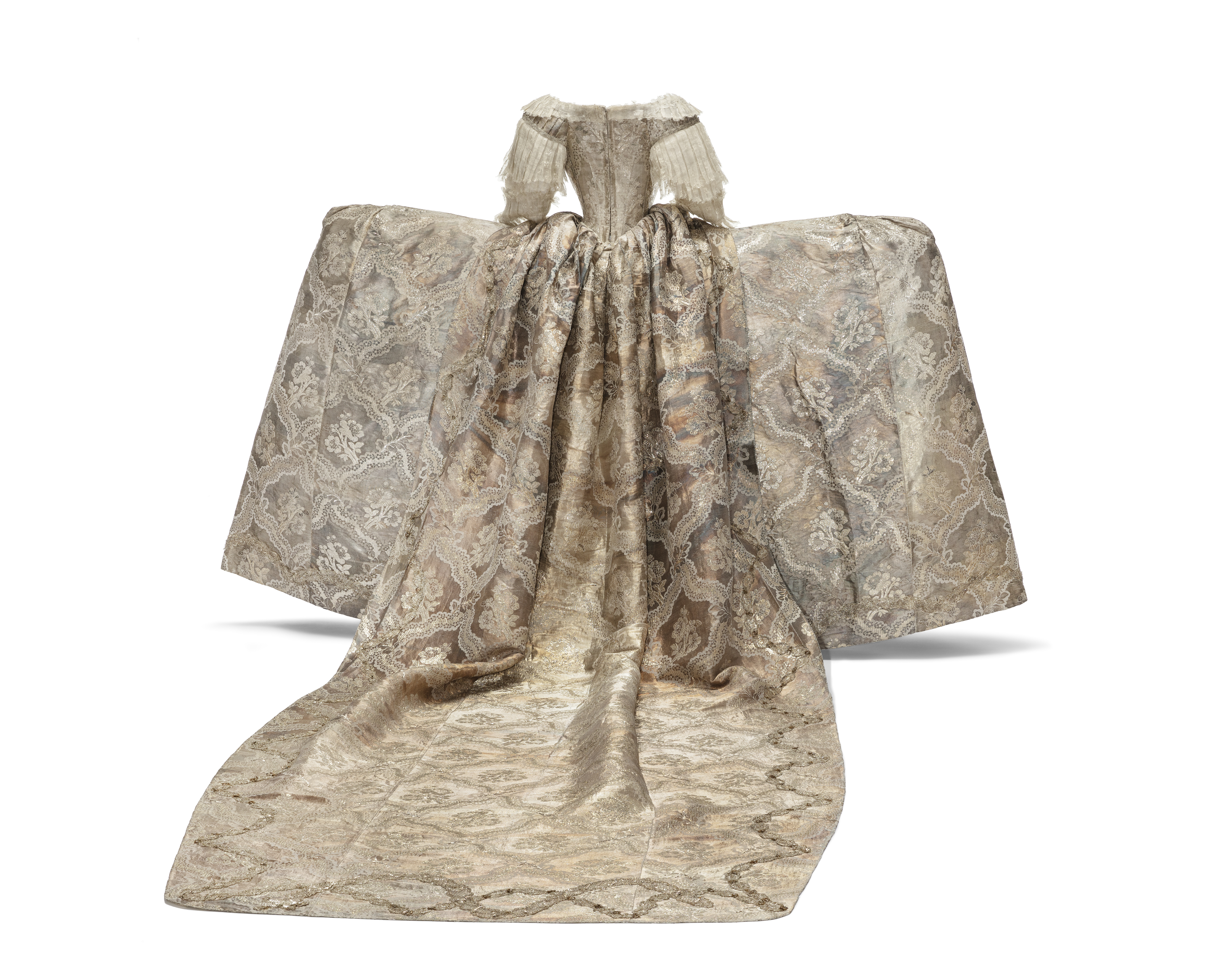
Sophia Magdalena of Denmark's wedding dress, 1766. The Royal Armoury in Sweden.

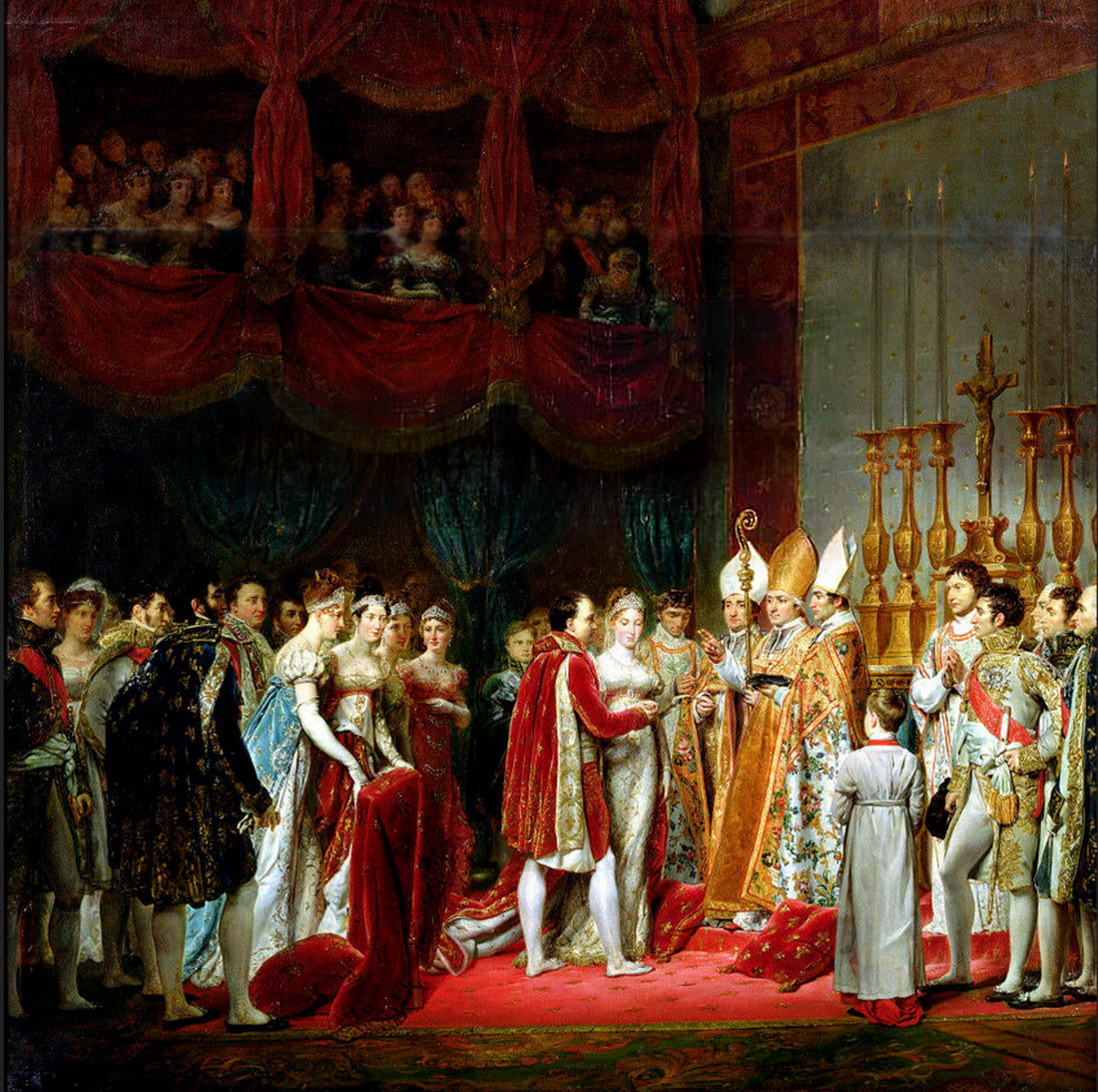
The Wedding of Napoleon and Marie Louise by Georges Rouget, France, 1810.

=== Wedding dresses from different areas of the world ===
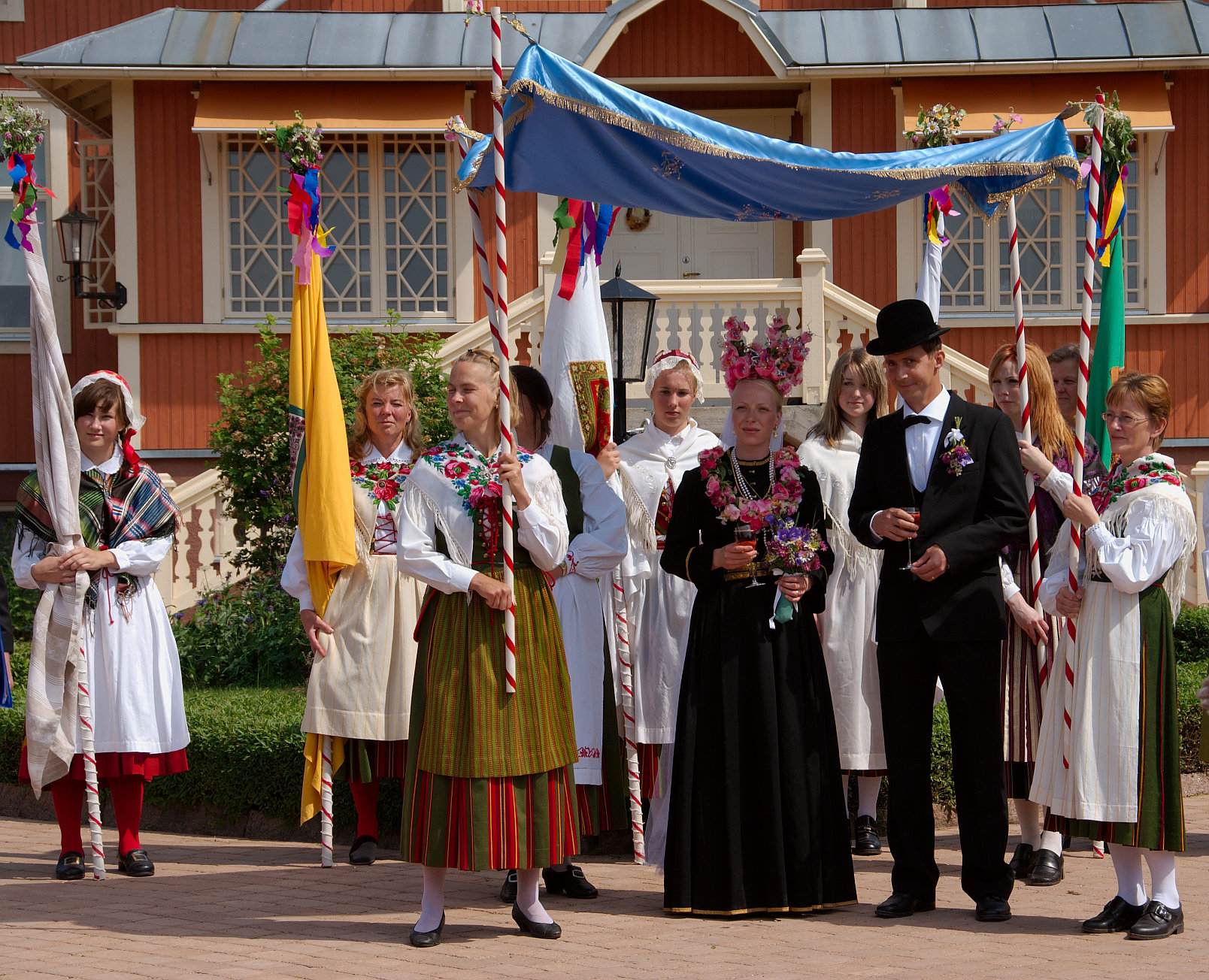
Traditional Finnish farmer wedding dress in Jomala, Åland

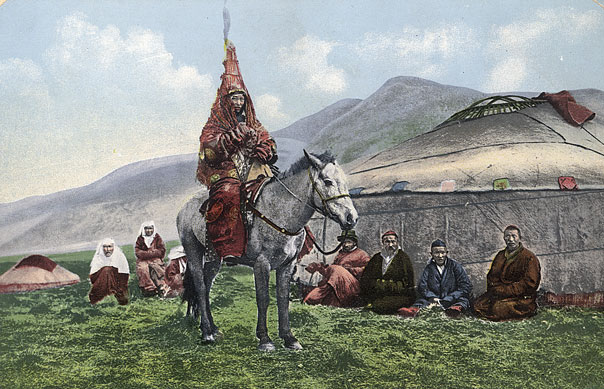
Traditional Kazakh wedding dress

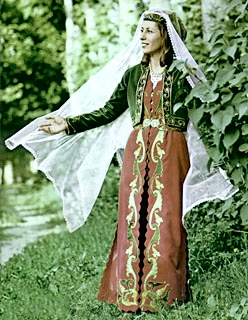
Traditional Armenian wedding dress

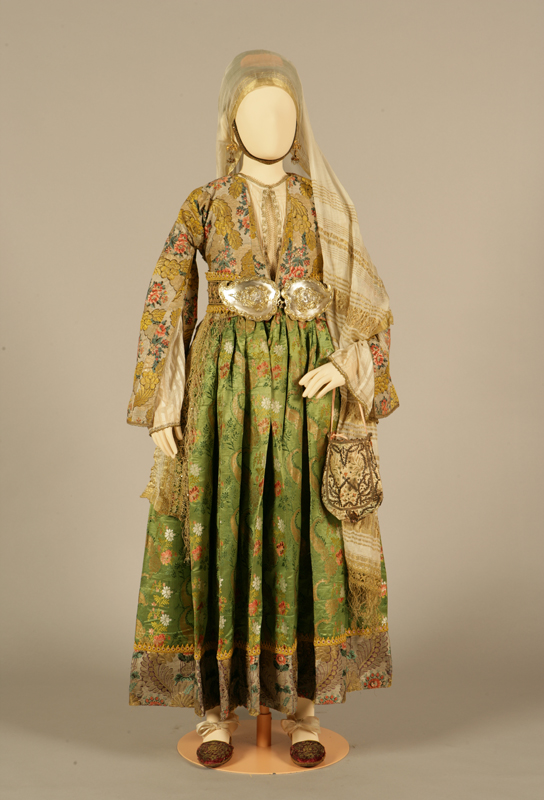
18th-century wedding dress from Kymi, Greece (Collection of PFF, Nauplio)

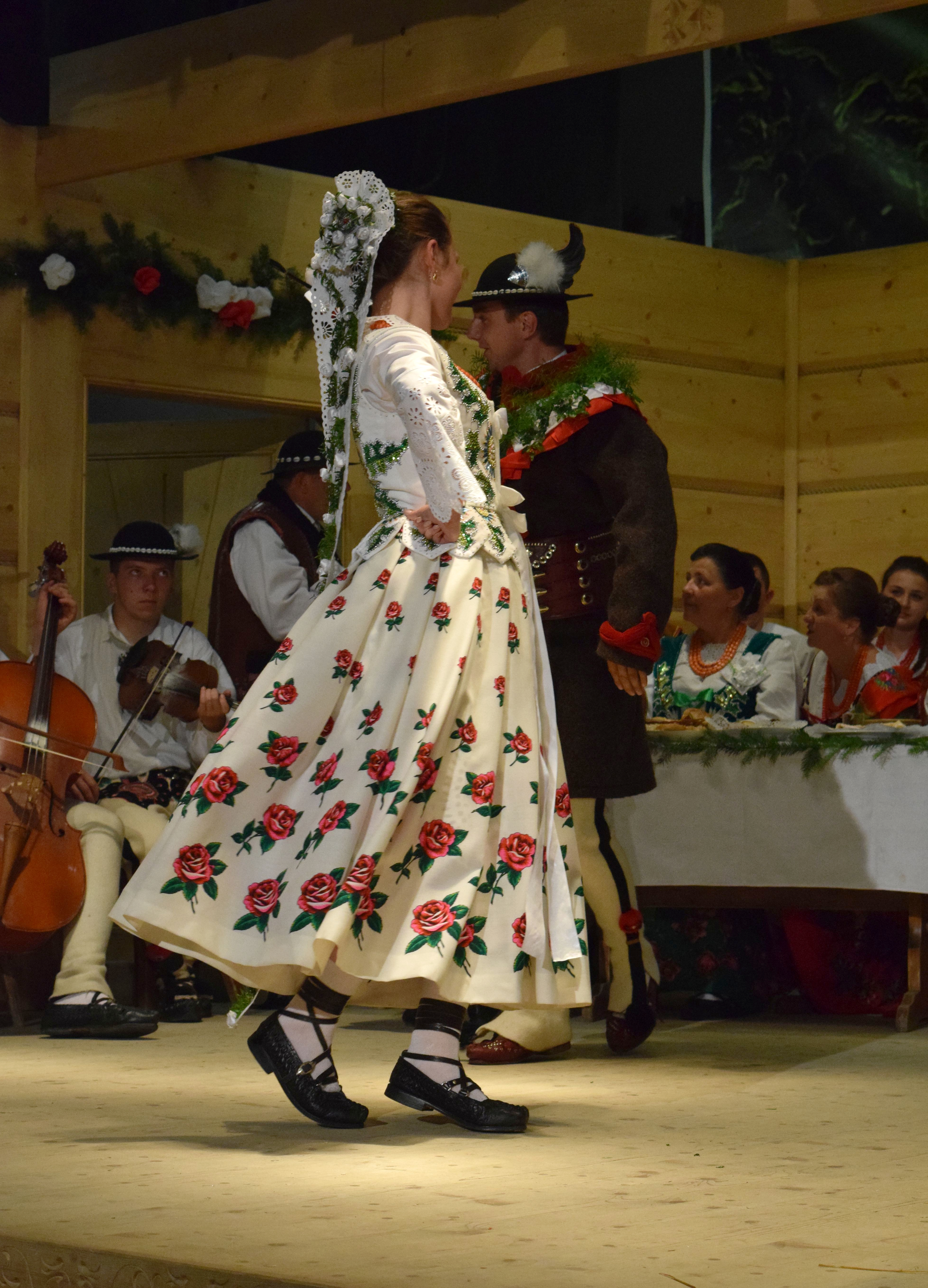
Bride in a wedding dress, Podhale, the Tatra Mountains

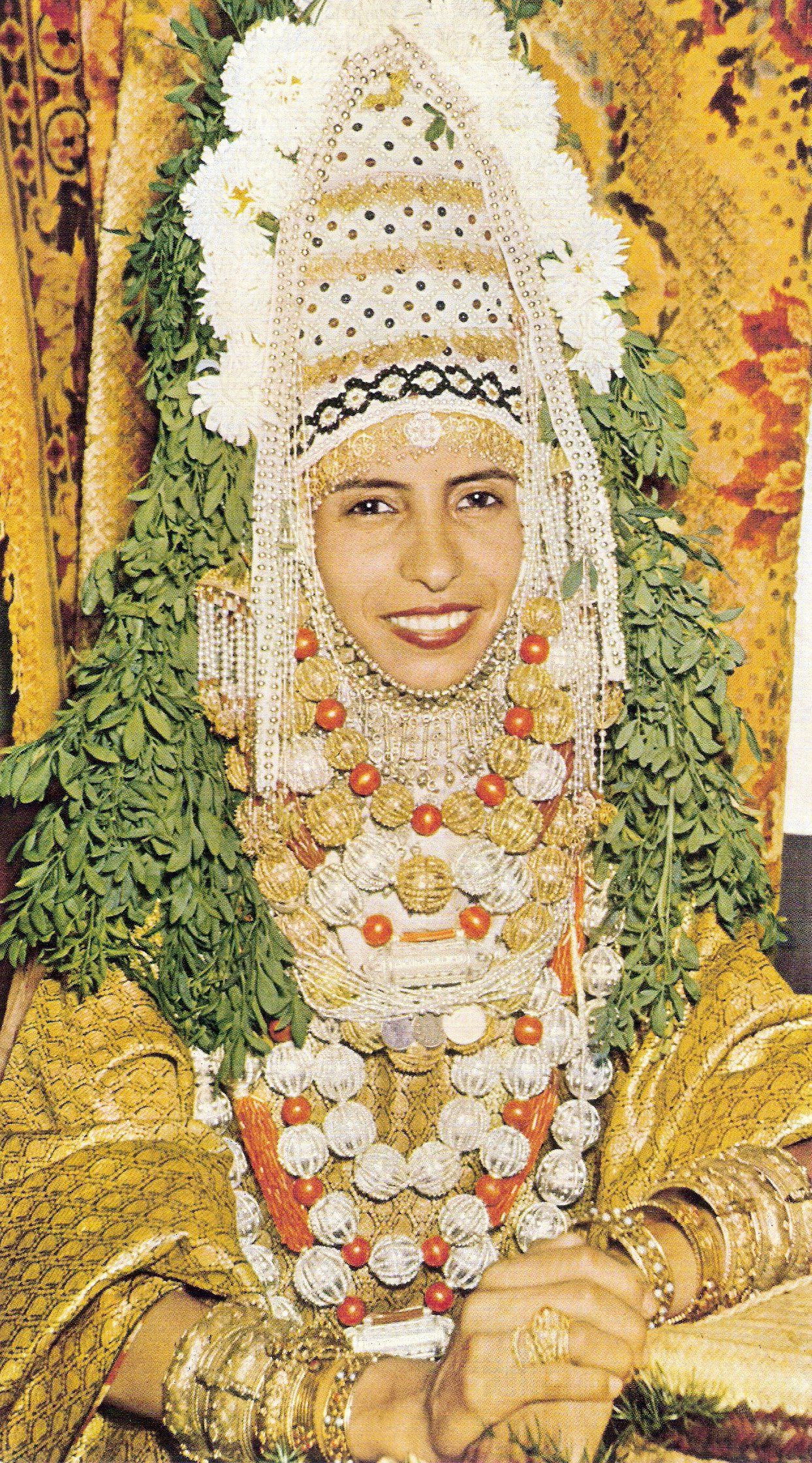
Yemenite Jewish bride in Israel, 1950s

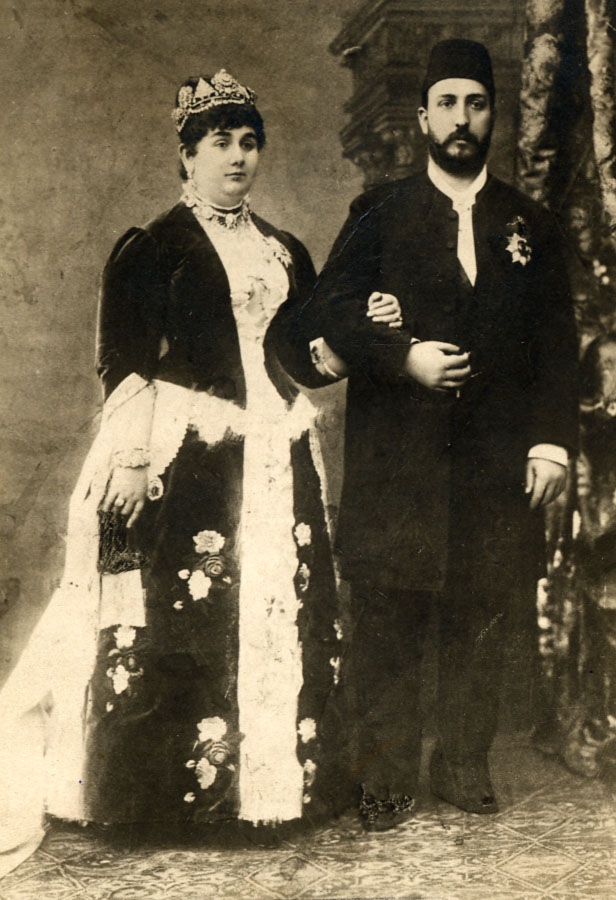
Wedding of Tewfik Pasha and Emina Ilhamy, Cairo, Egypt, January 1873

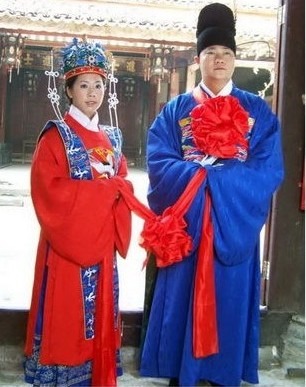
Chinese couple wearing traditional wedding hanfu

=== South Asian dresses ===
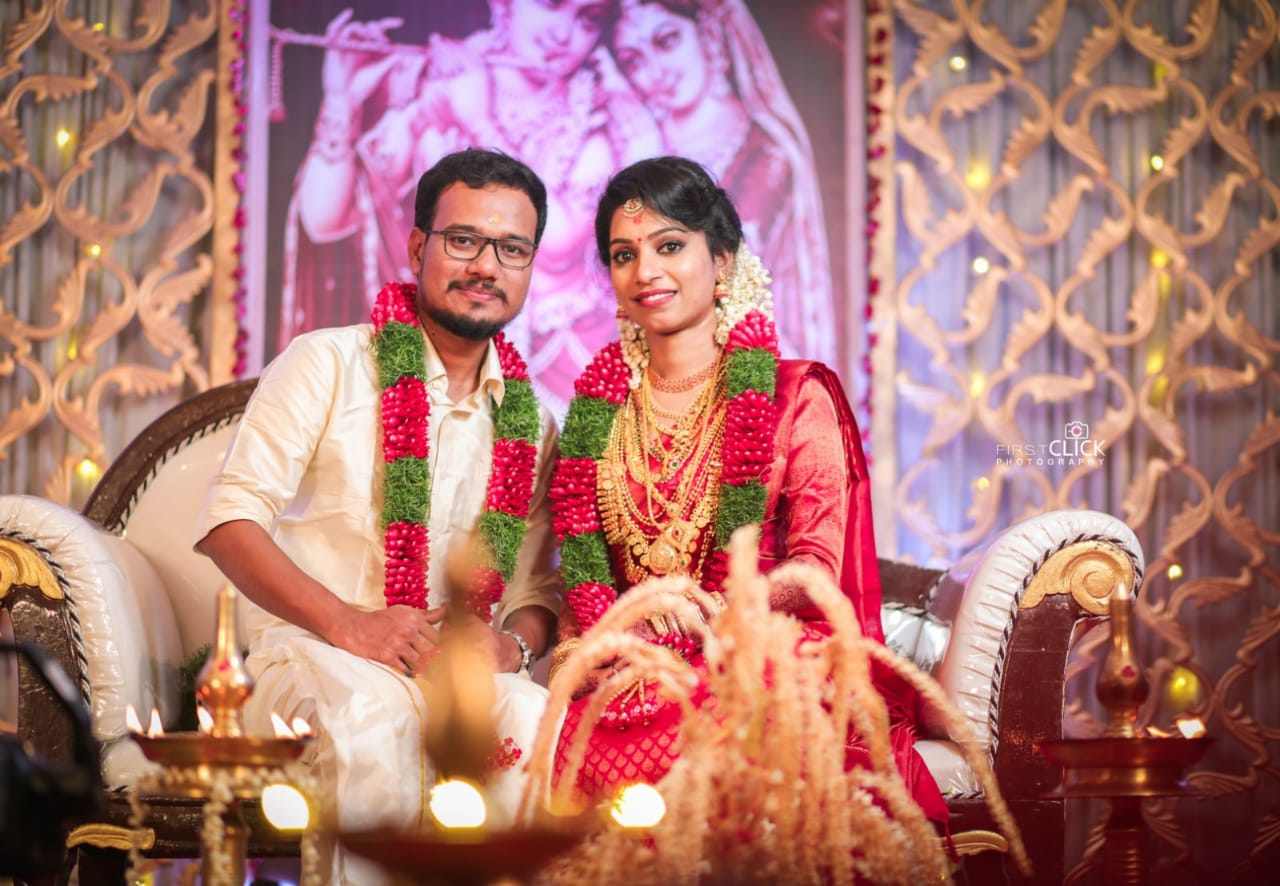
Indian Hindu bride in red Sari

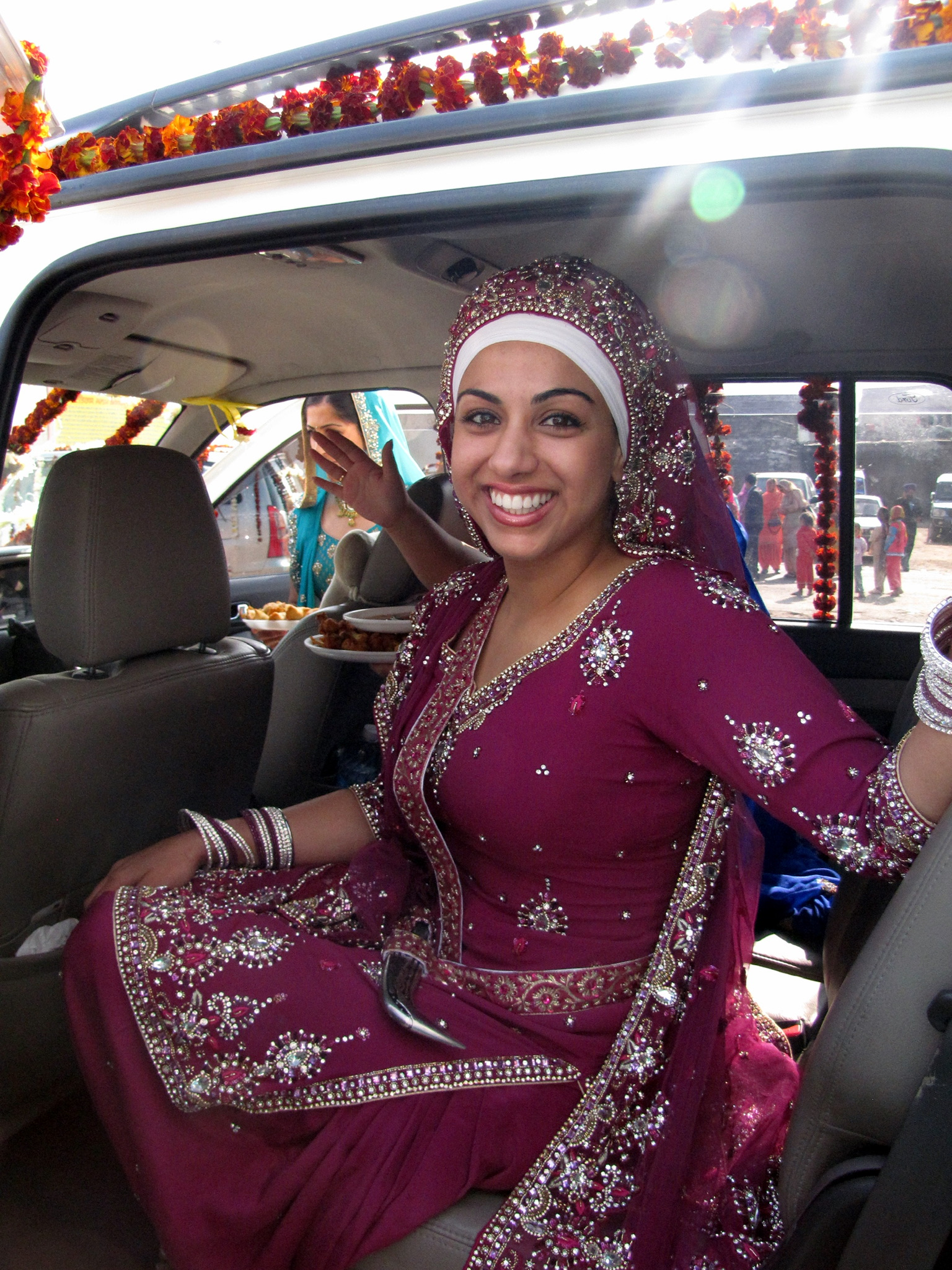
Sikh bride wearing purple lehenga and dastaar for Anand Karaj

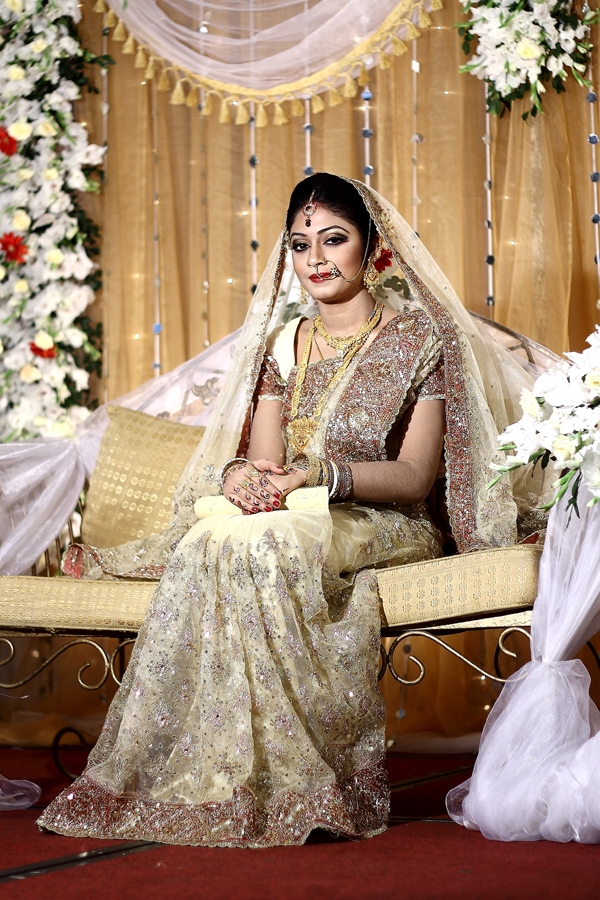
Traditional Bengali bride in formal matrimonial Sari

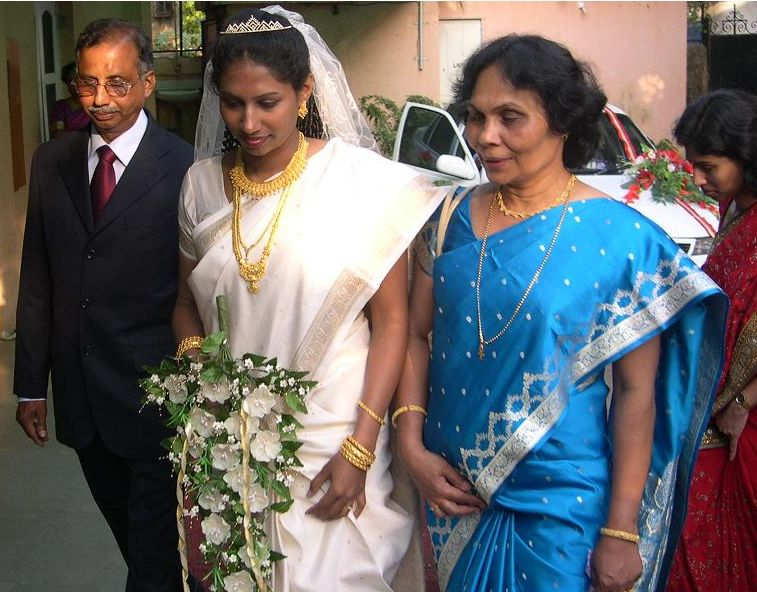
Indian Christian bride in white Sari

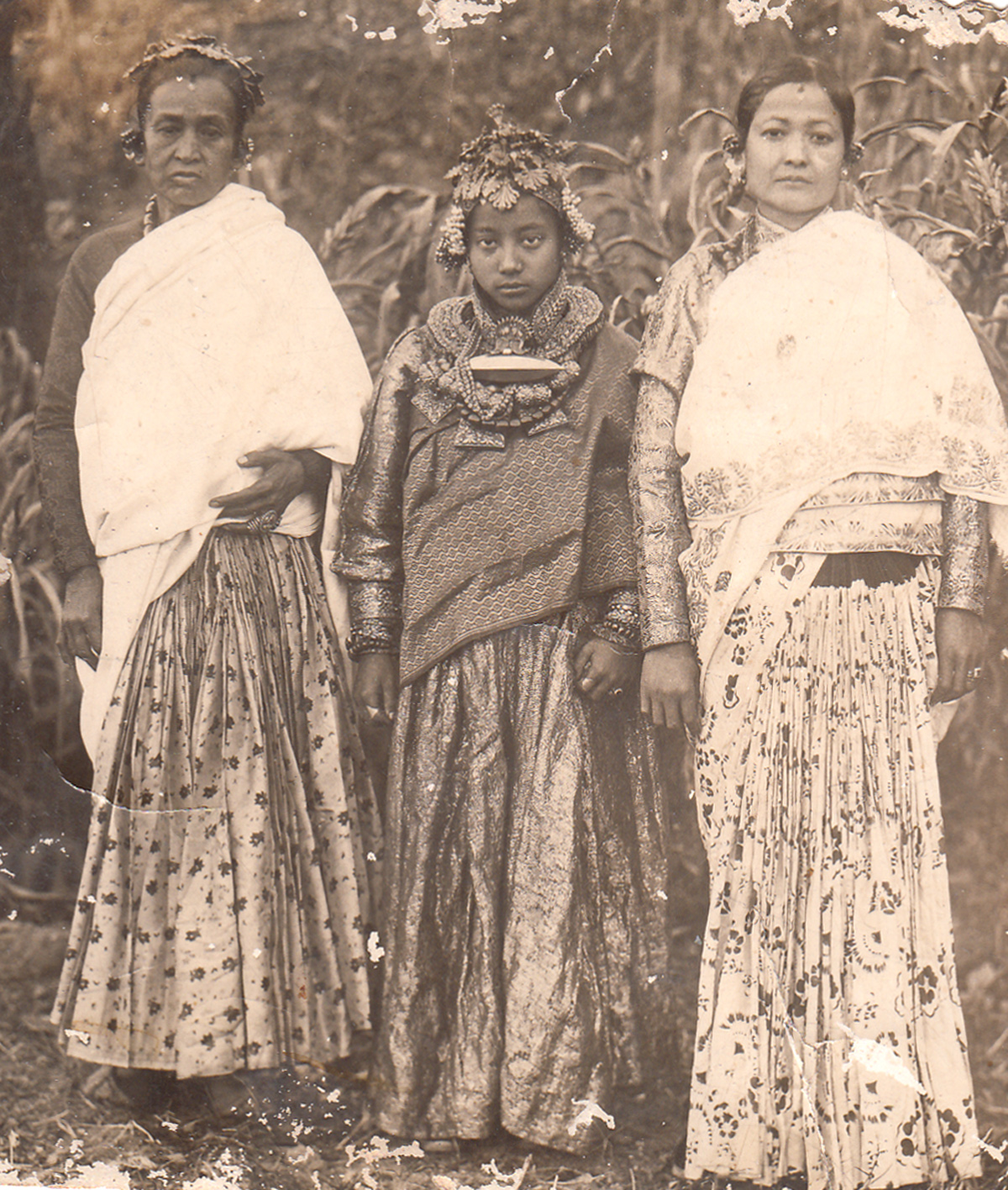
Nepali bride of Kathmandu, 1941

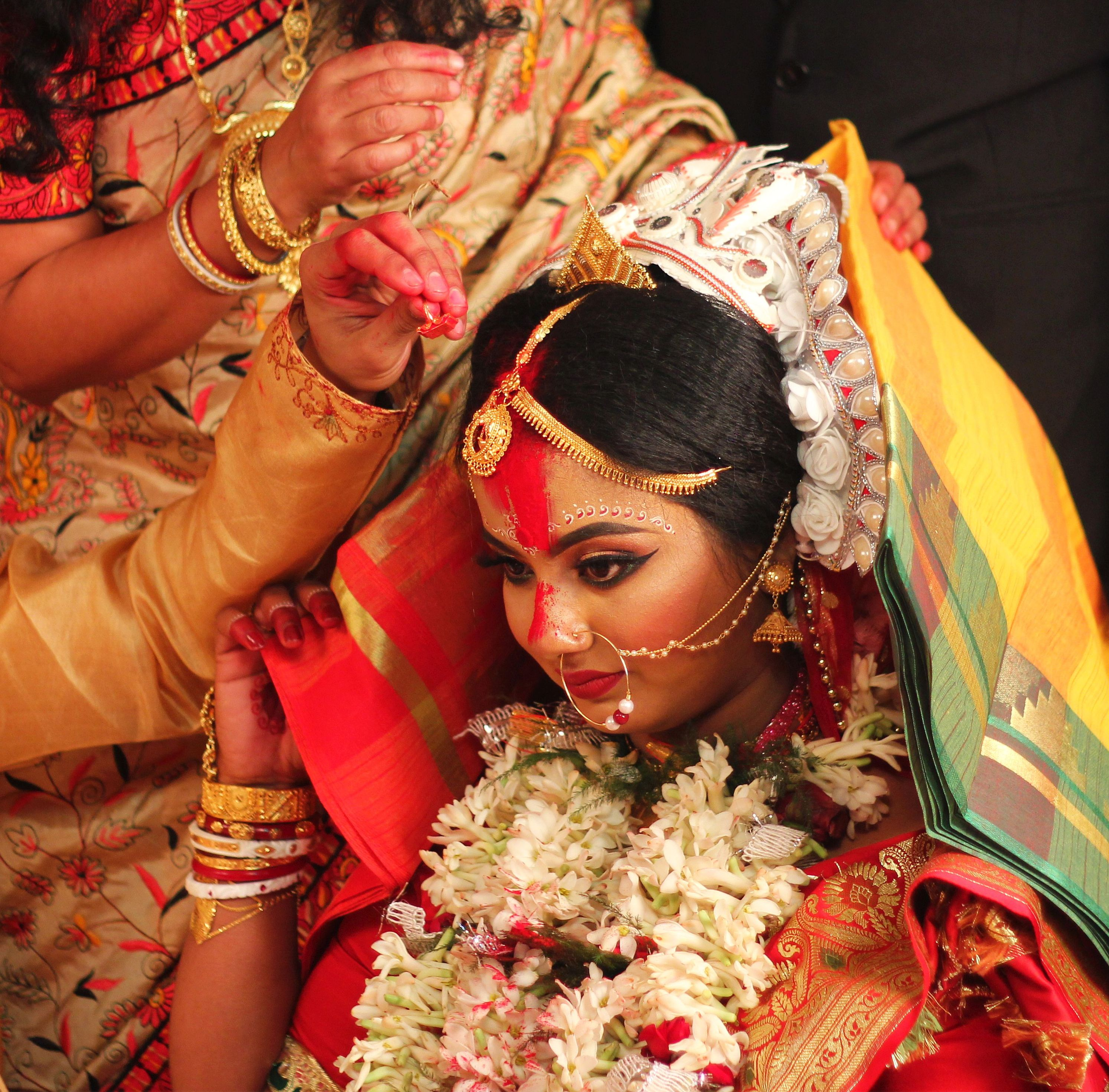
Bengali Hindu bride during Sindur Daan

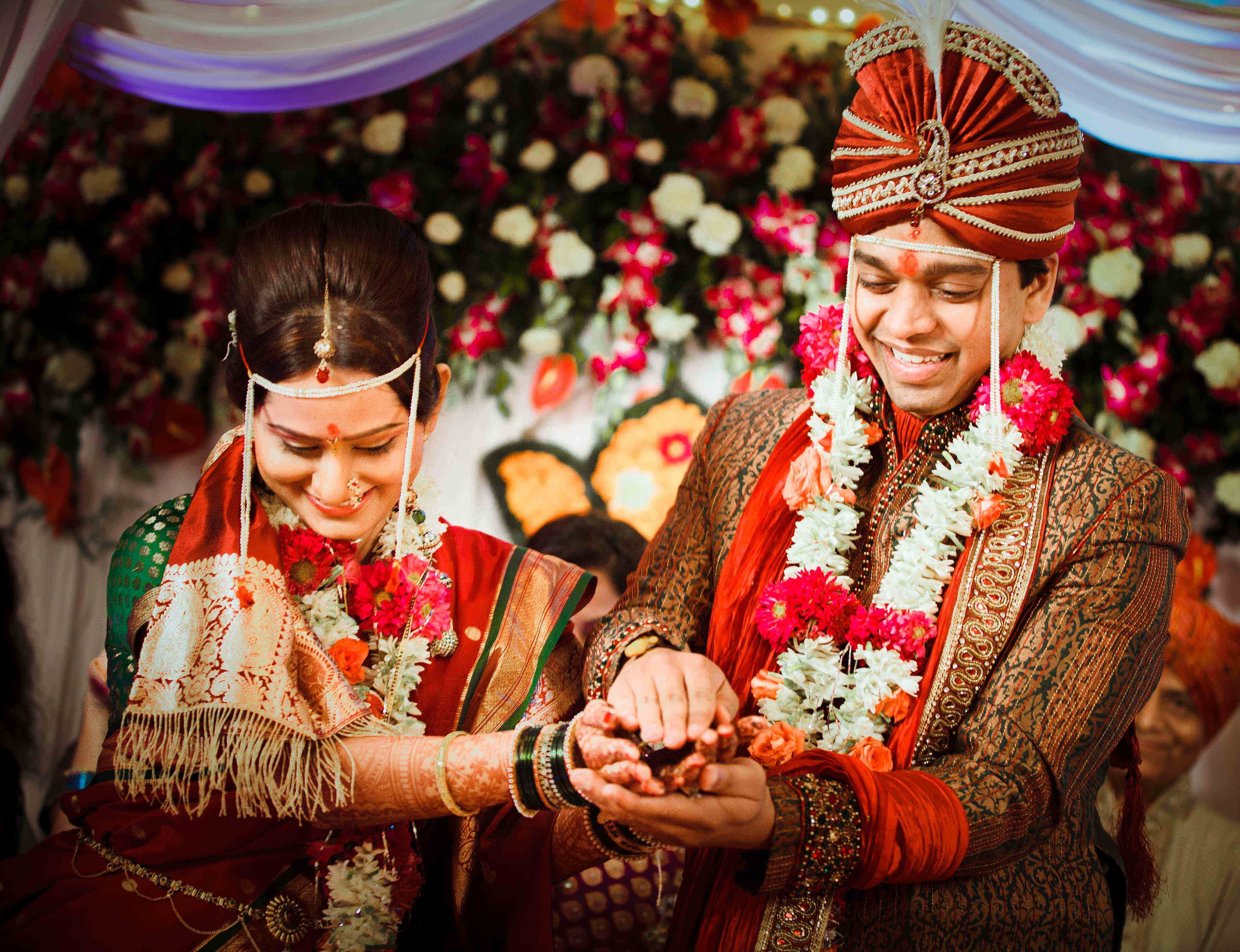
Marathi wedding

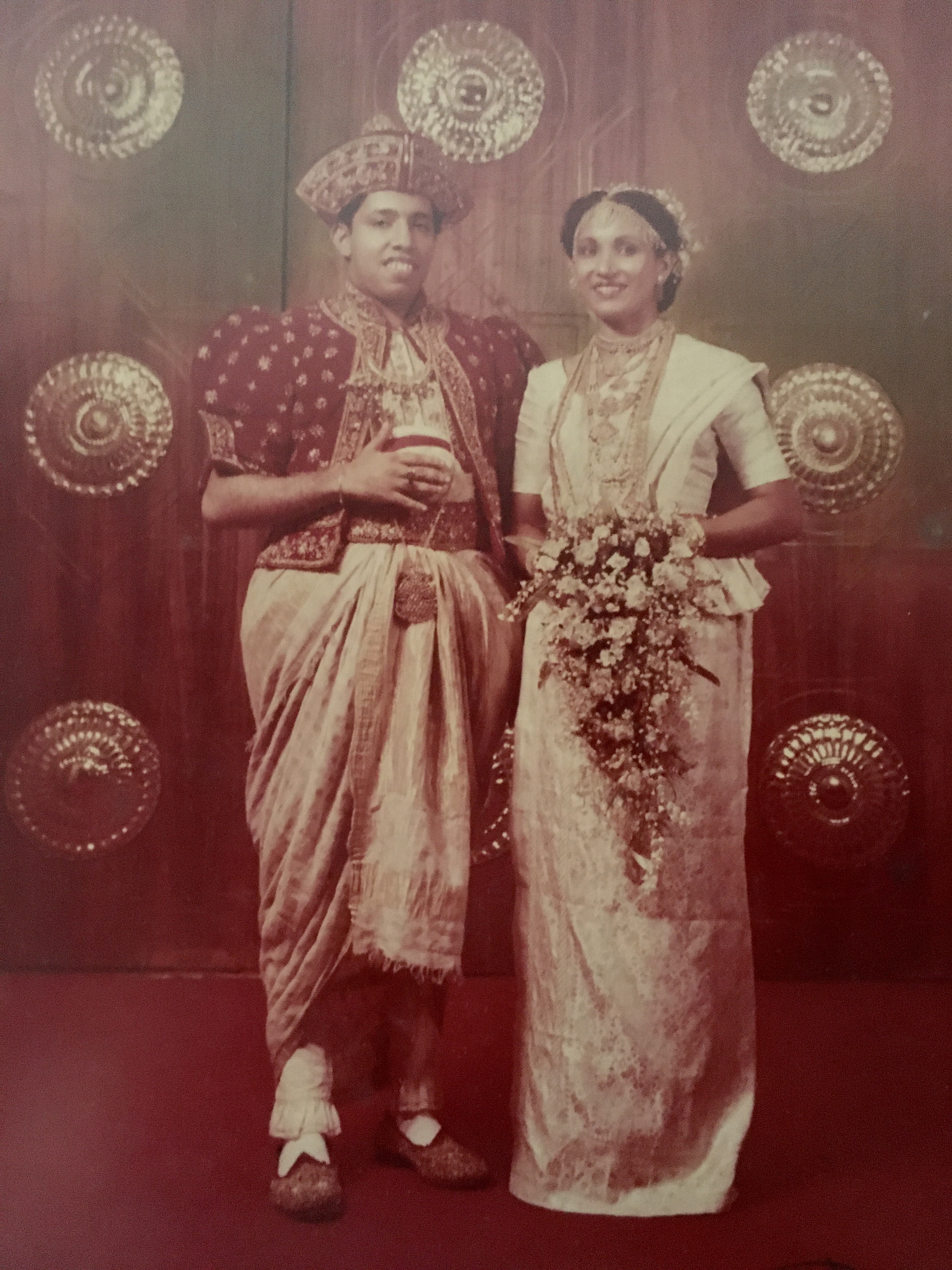
Sri Lankan wedding

=== Southeast Asian dresses ===
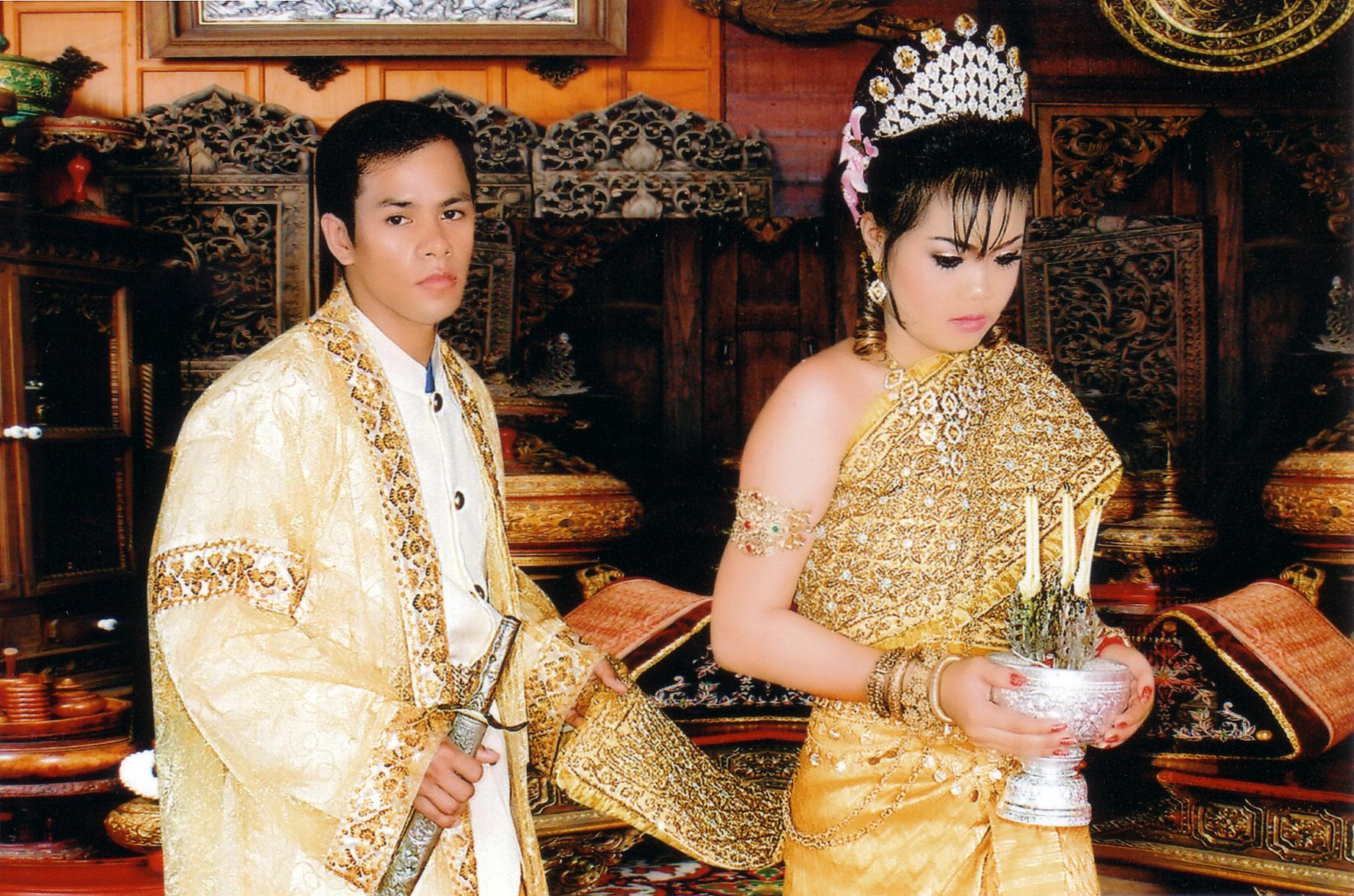
Khmer (Cambodian) couple dressed in traditional wedding outfits

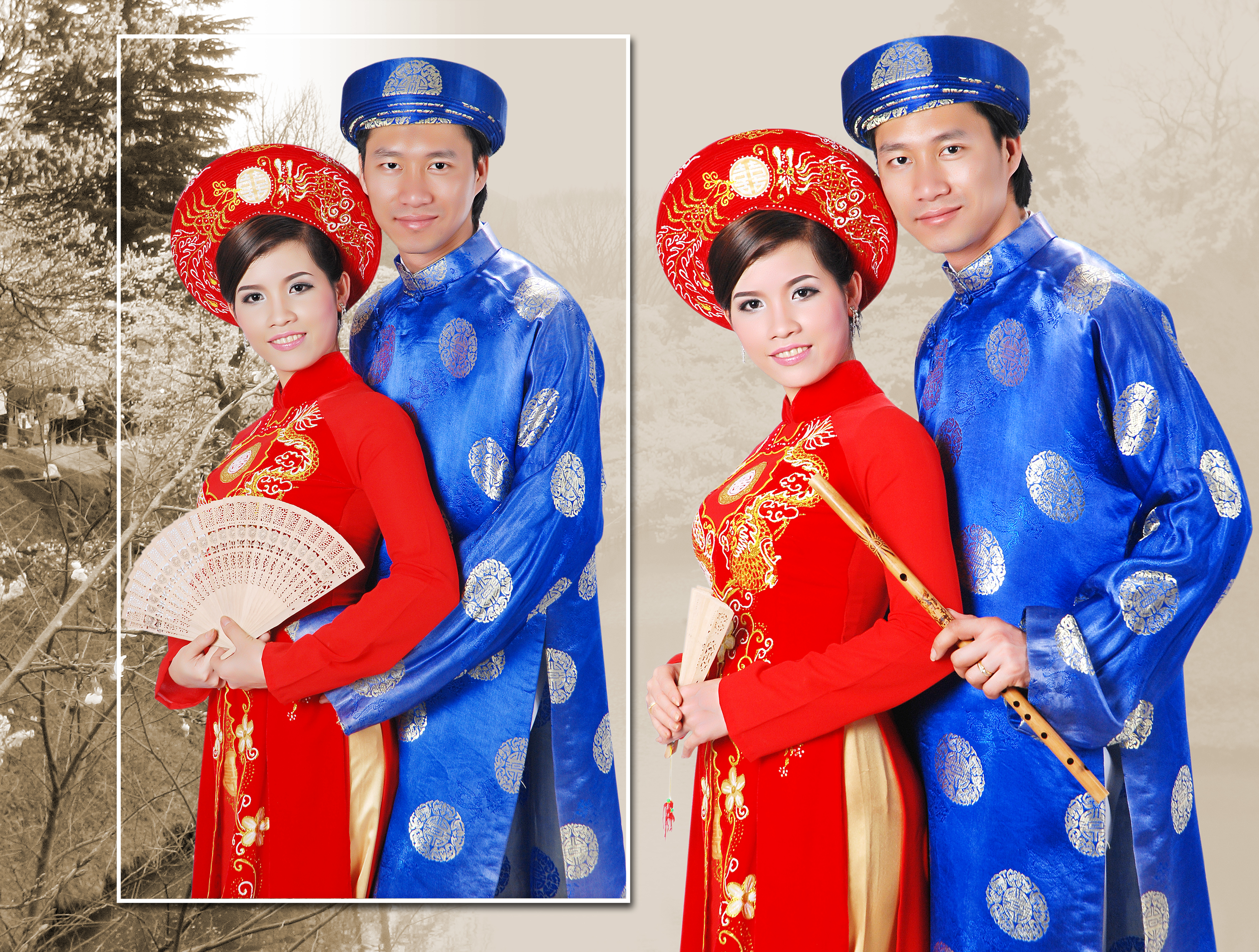
Vietnamese couple in traditional dress

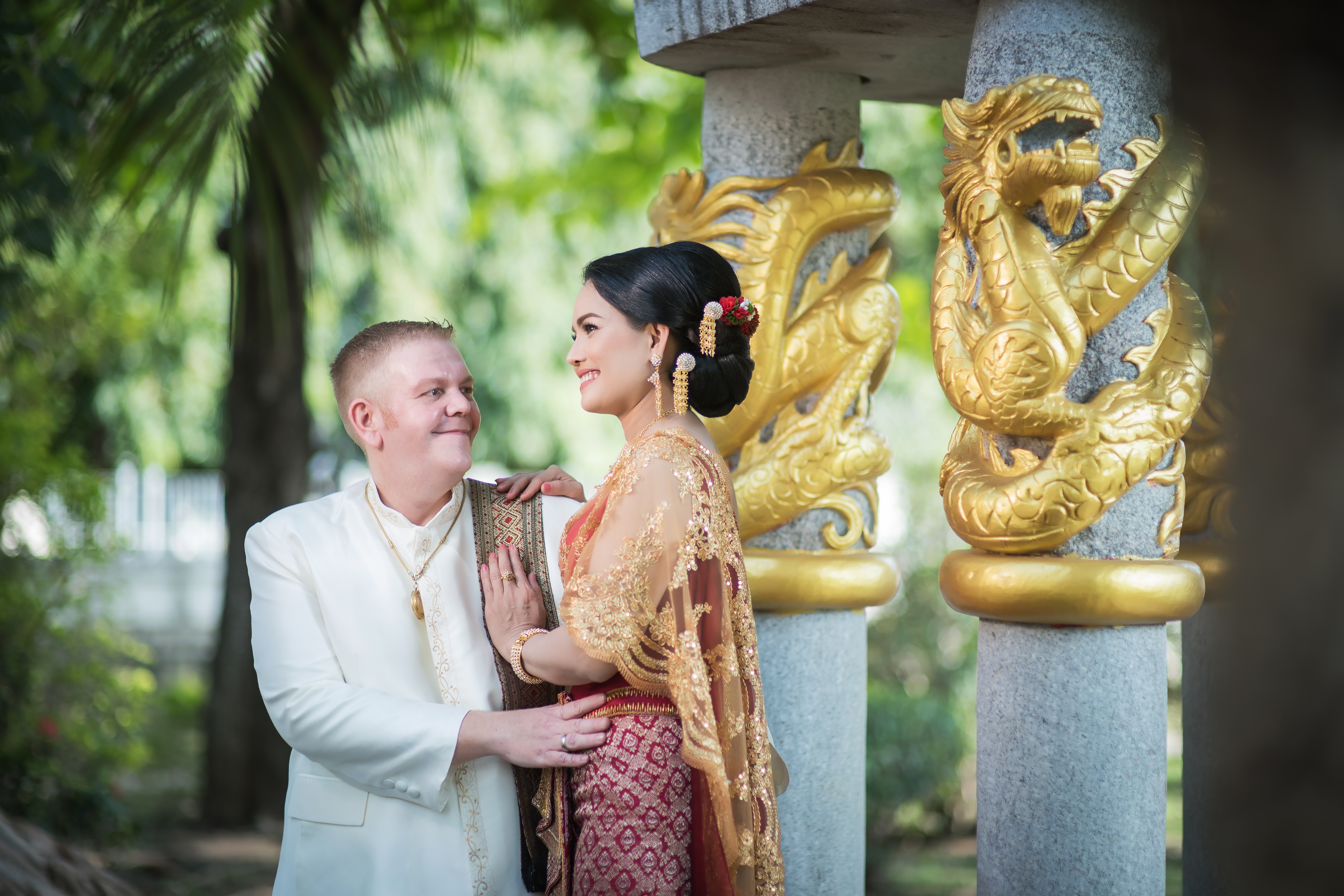
Couple dress in traditional Thai outfits

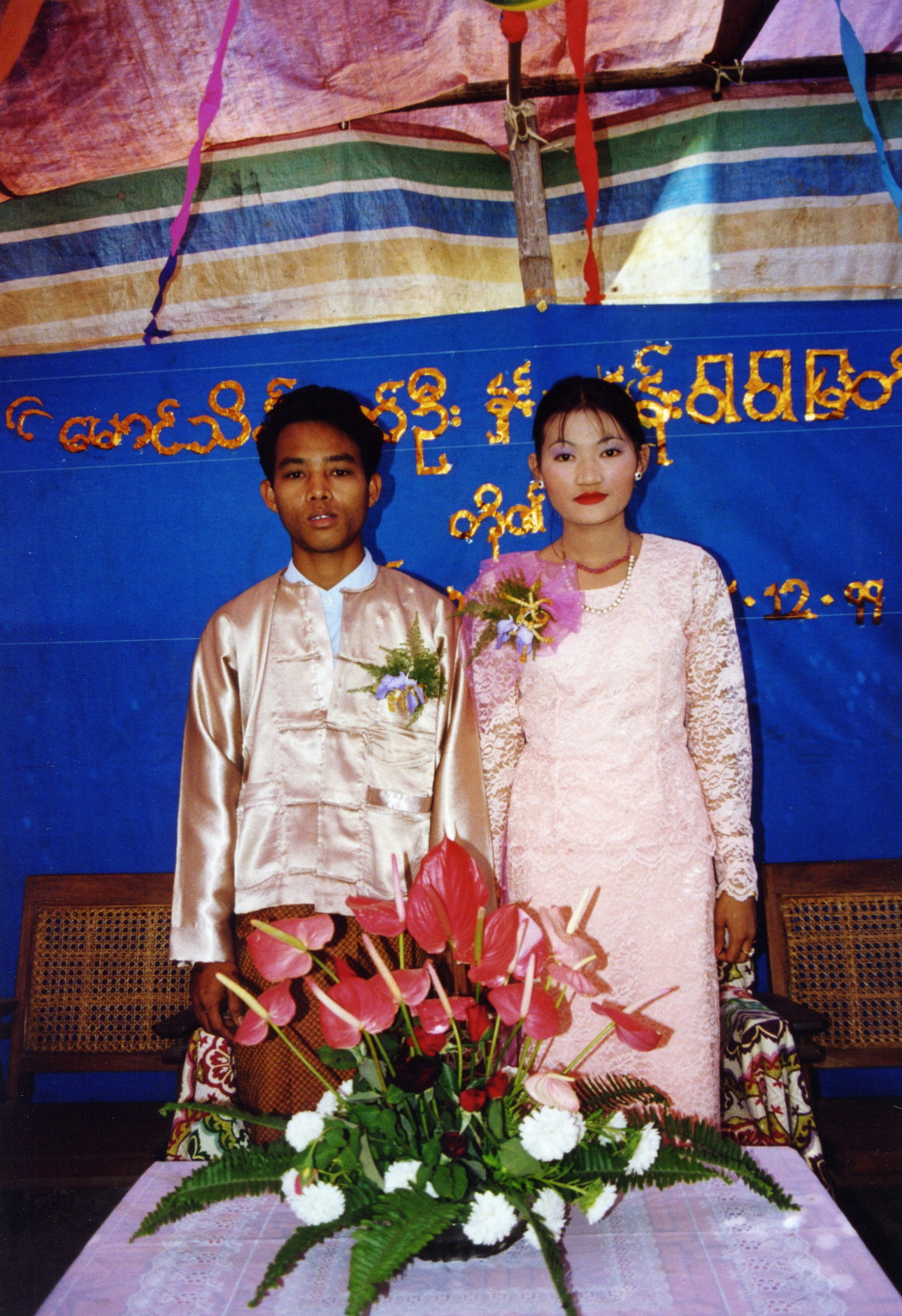
Couple dressed in traditional Burmese outfits

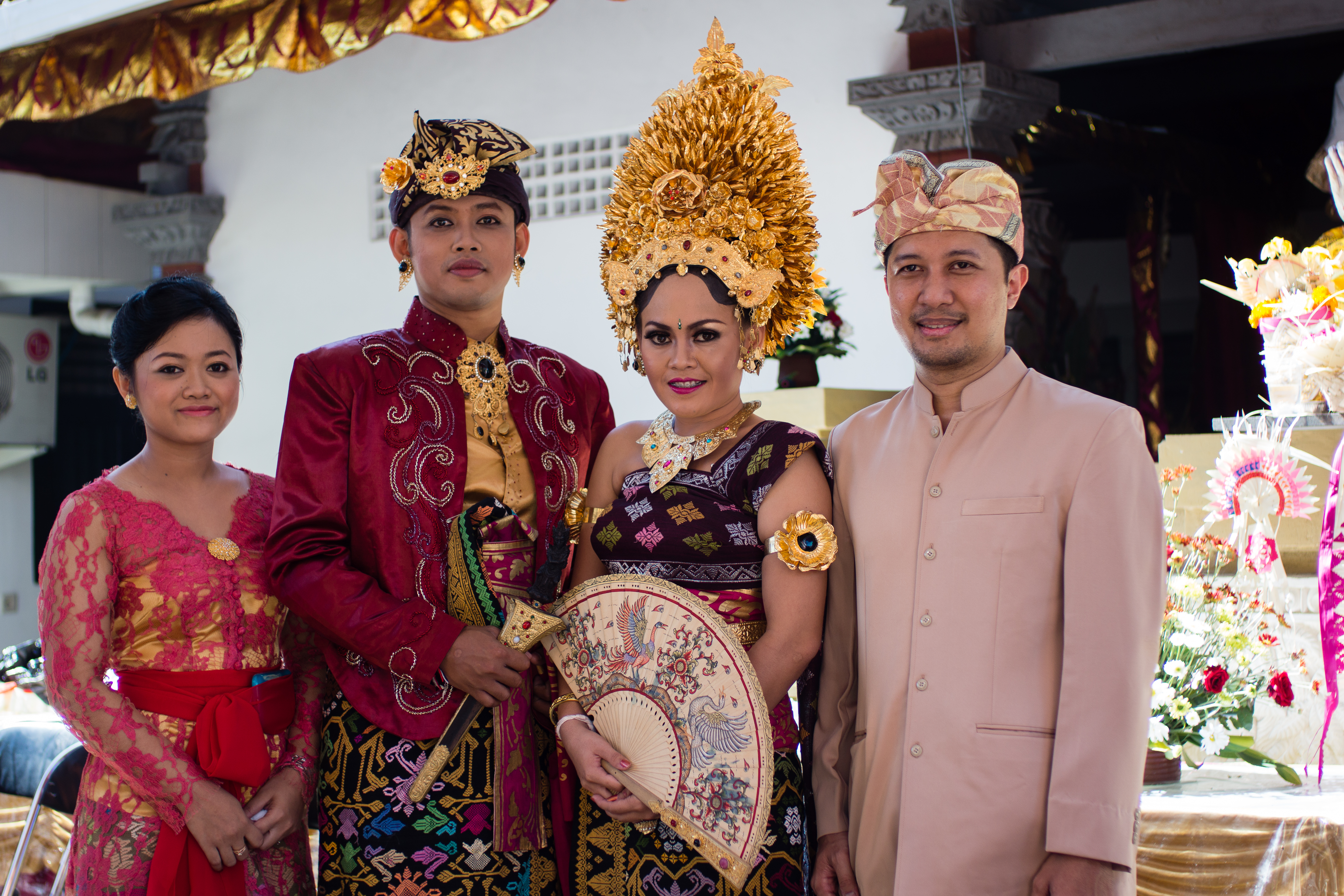
Bali Hindu wedding dress

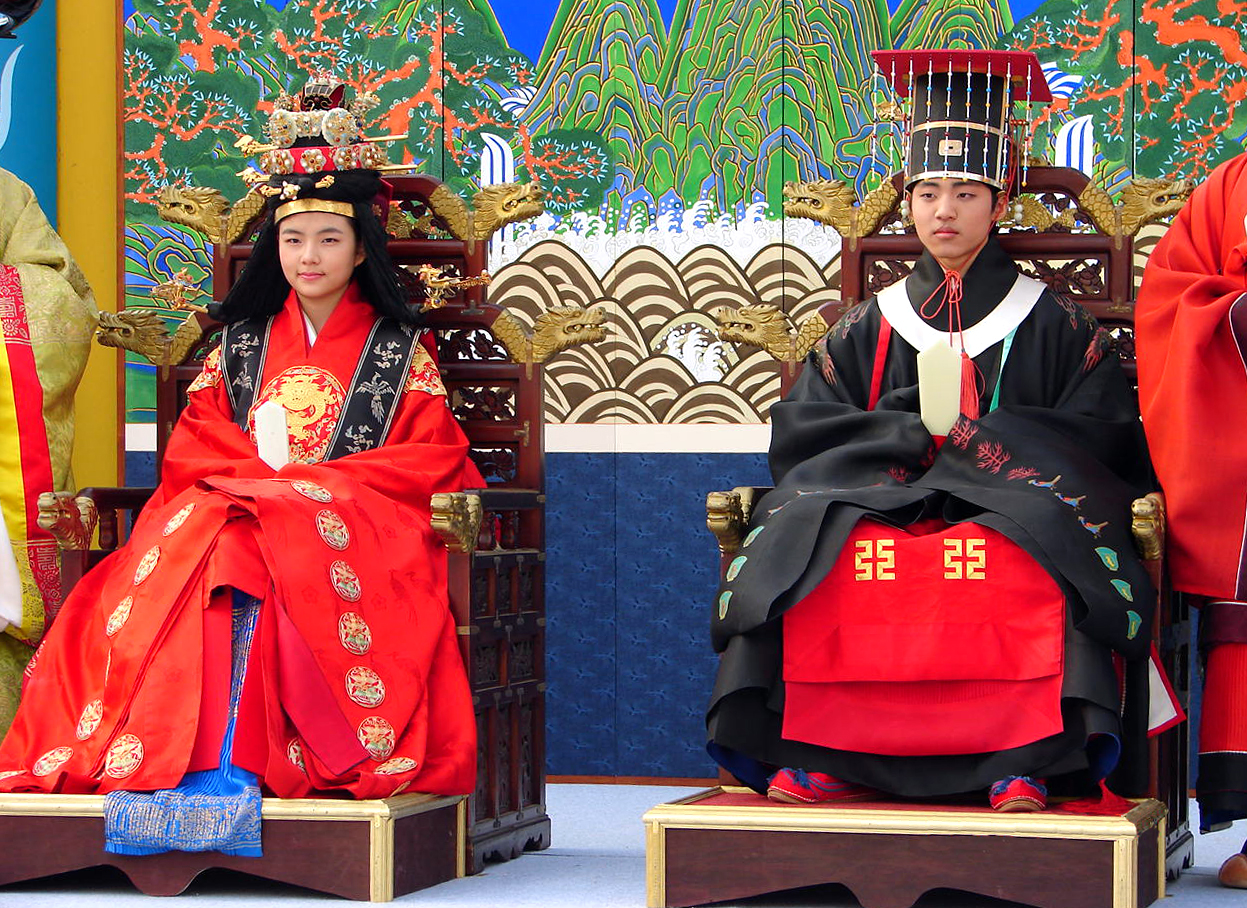
Reenactment of the royal wedding ceremony of King Gojong and Queen Myeongseong

=== Modern Western-style dresses ===
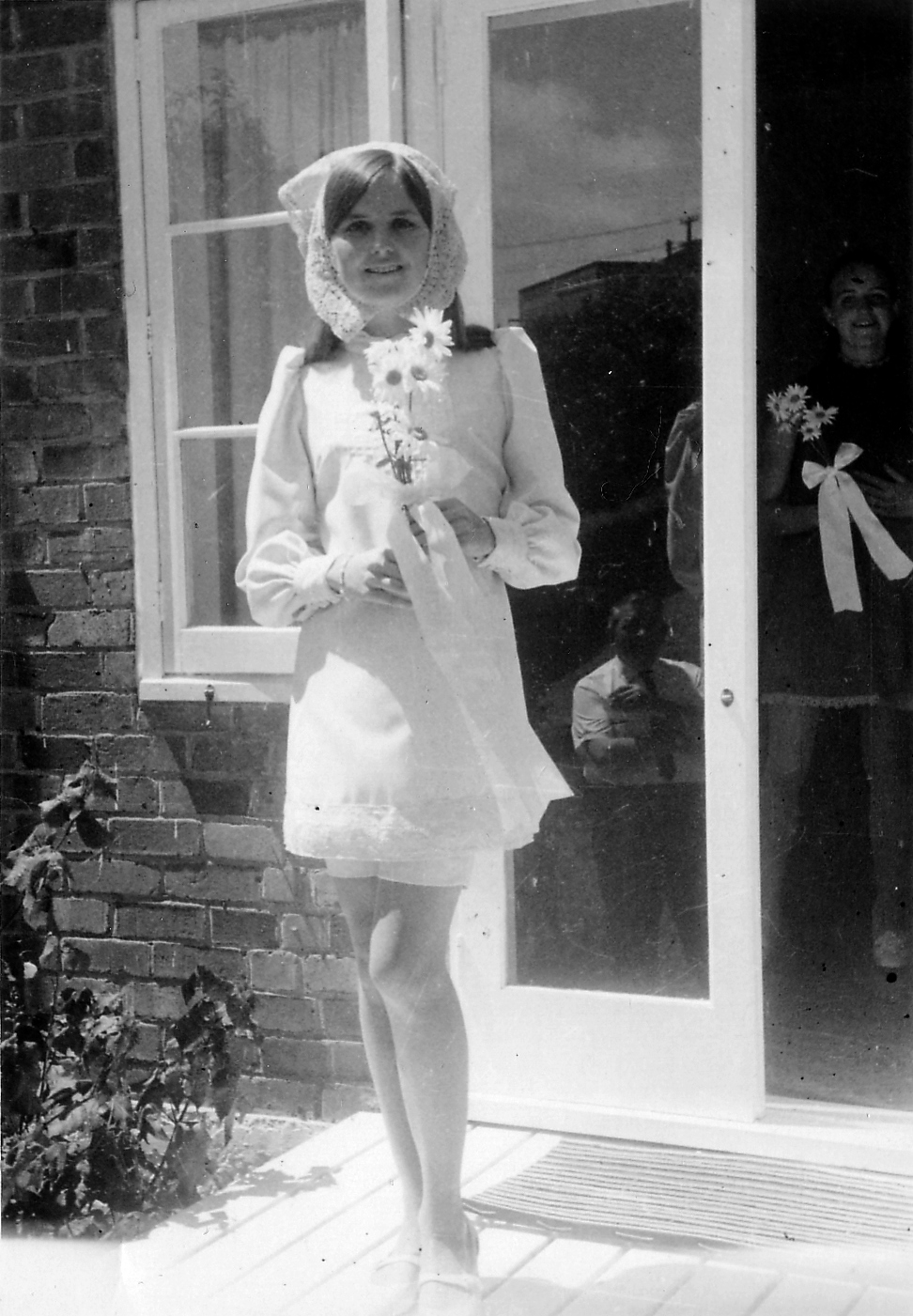
A bride in 1968, wearing a dress reflecting the styles of the time

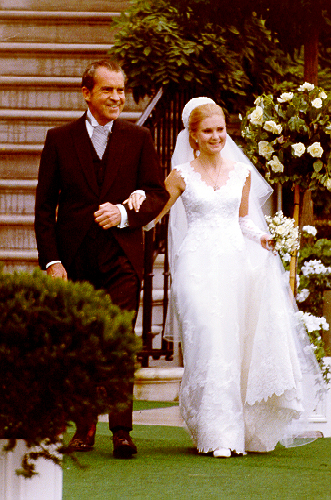
Patricia Nixon Cox with her father Richard Nixon, 1971

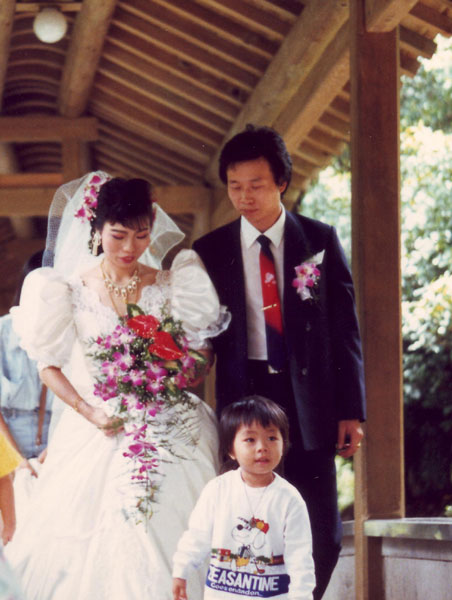
Taiwanese couple dressed Western-style for keepsake photos in the park, 1989

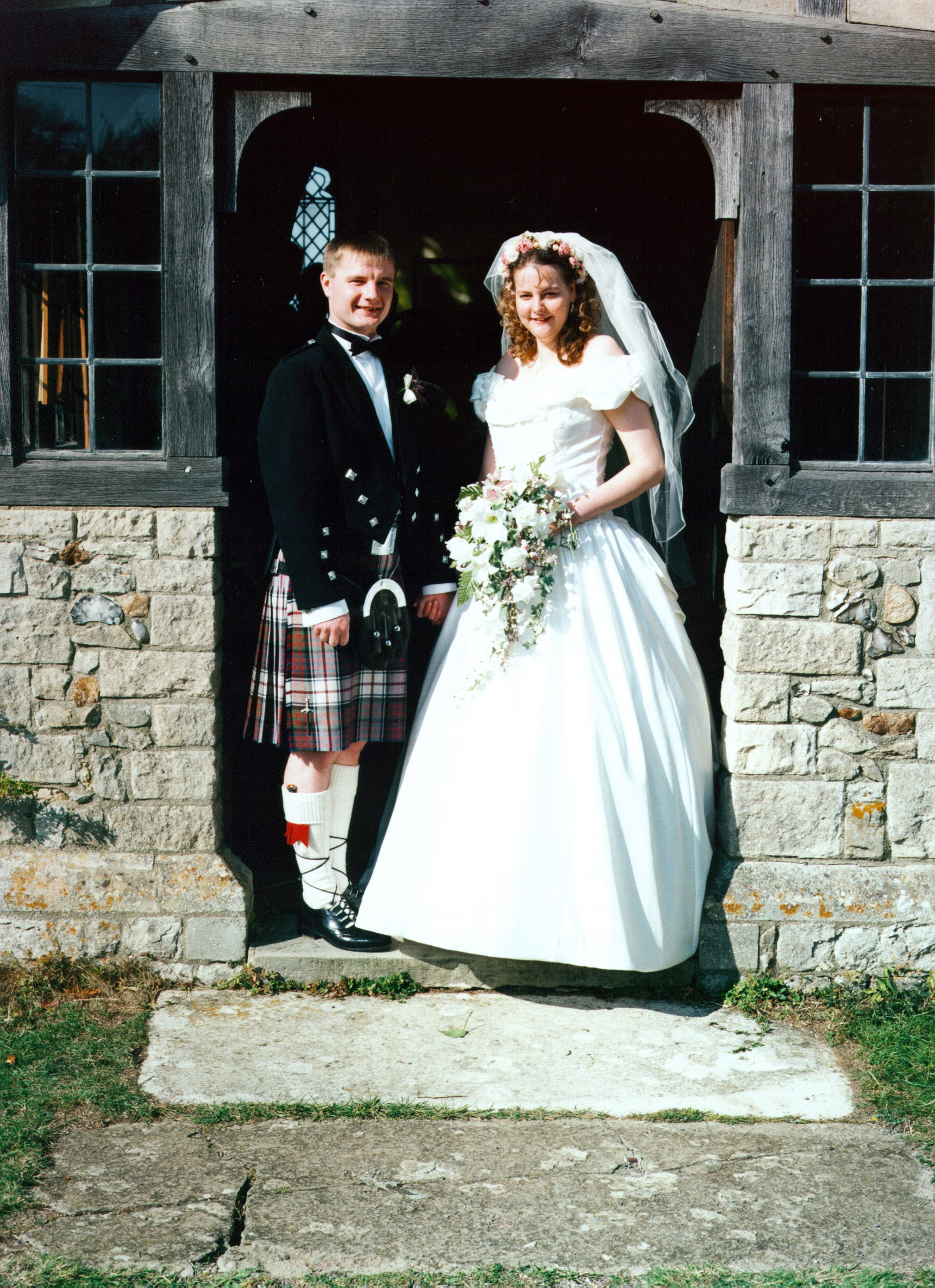
American bride marrying a Scotsman wearing a kilt, 1996

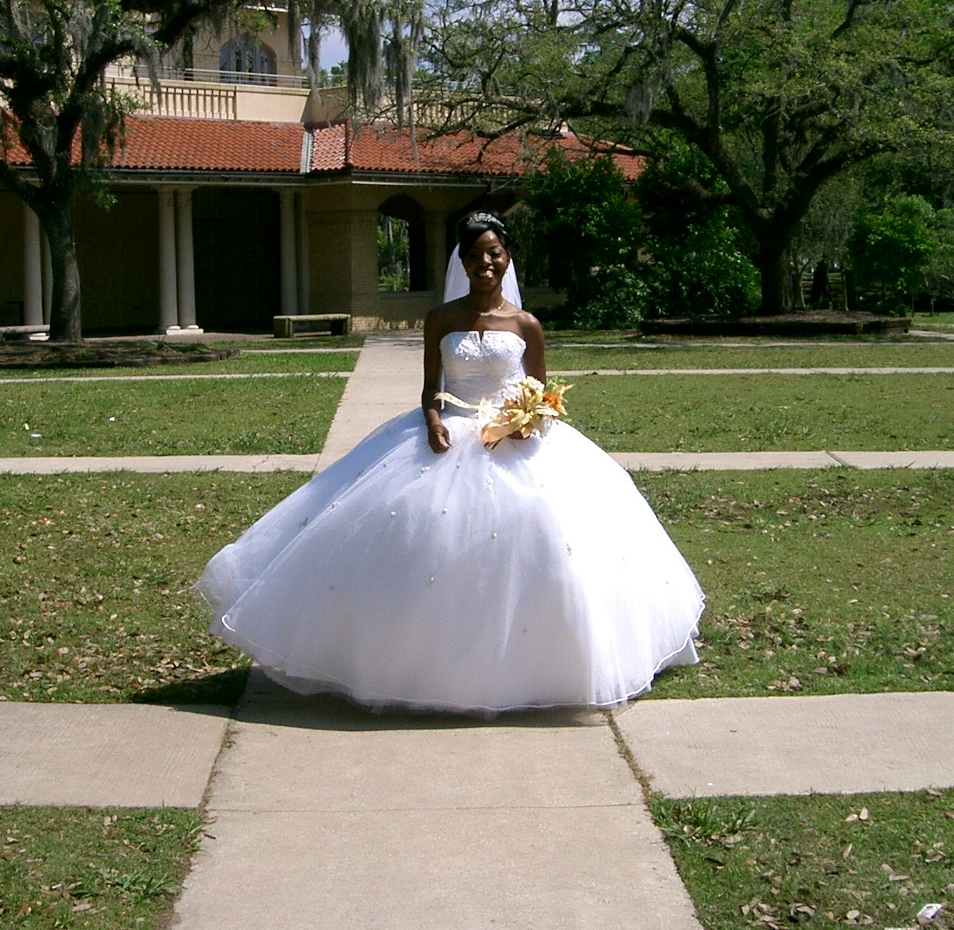
New Orleans bride wearing a strapless, sleeveless gown, 2006

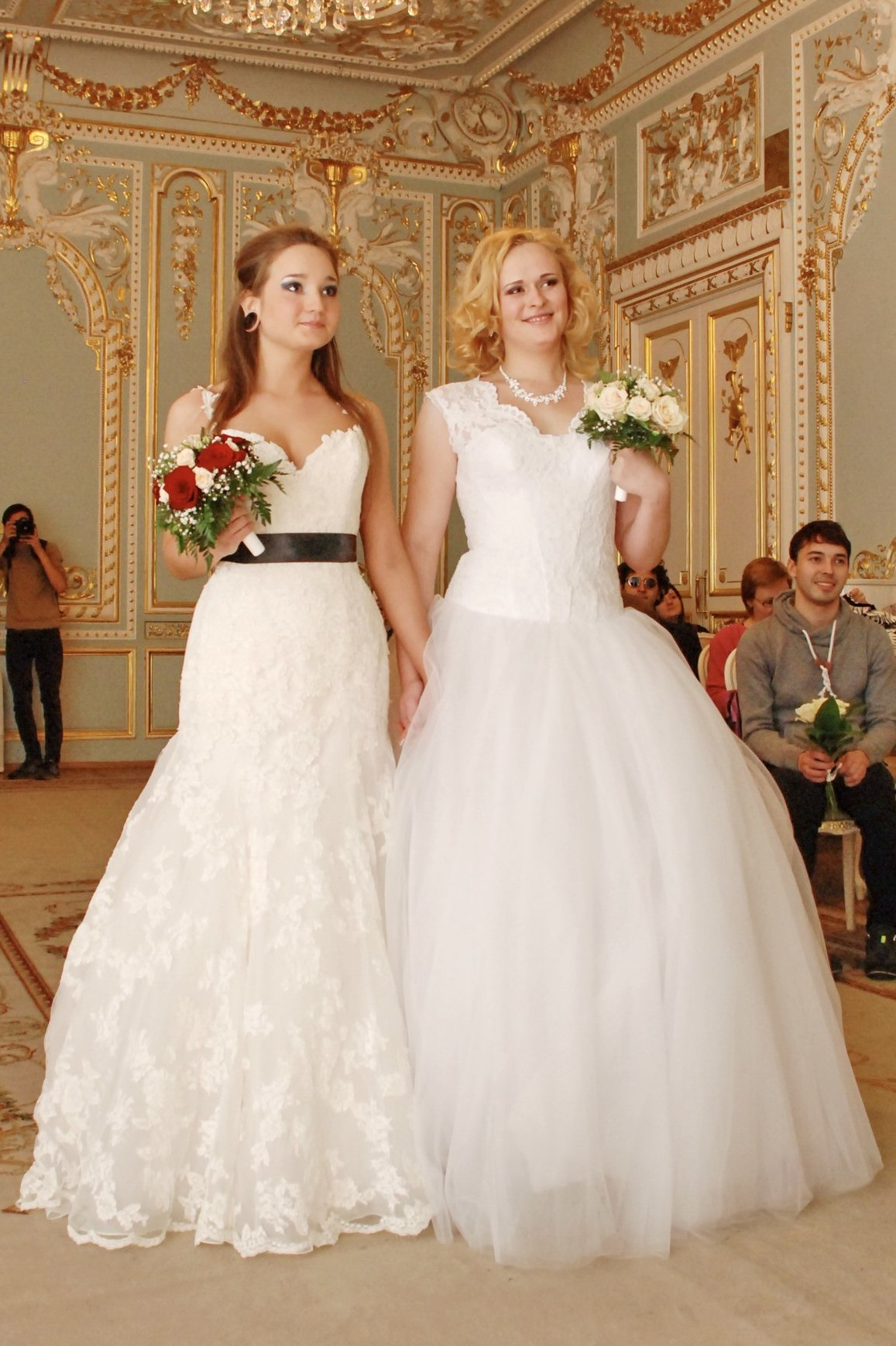
Same-gender marriage. Saint Petersburg, Russia, 2014.

== See also ==
- Bridal crown
- Christian clothing
- Godey's Lady's Book
- Religious clothing
- Victorian fashion
- Wedding dress of Camilla Parker Bowles
- Wedding dress of Grace Kelly
- Wedding dress of Jacqueline Bouvier
- Wedding dress of Catherine Middleton
- Wedding dress of Lady Diana Spencer
- Wedding dress of Meghan Markle
- Wedding dress of Princess Alexandra of Denmark
- Wedding dresses of Princess Anne of the United Kingdom
- Wedding dress of Princess Elizabeth of the United Kingdom
- Wedding dress of Princess Margaret of the United Kingdom
- Wedding dress of Princess Mary of Teck
- Wedding dress of Queen Victoria
- Wedding dress of Sarah Ferguson
- Wedding dress of Sophie Rhys-Jones
- Wedding dress of Victoria, Princess Royal
- Wedding dress of Wallis Warfield
