= Windsor Guildhall =

Municipal building in Windsor, Berkshire, England

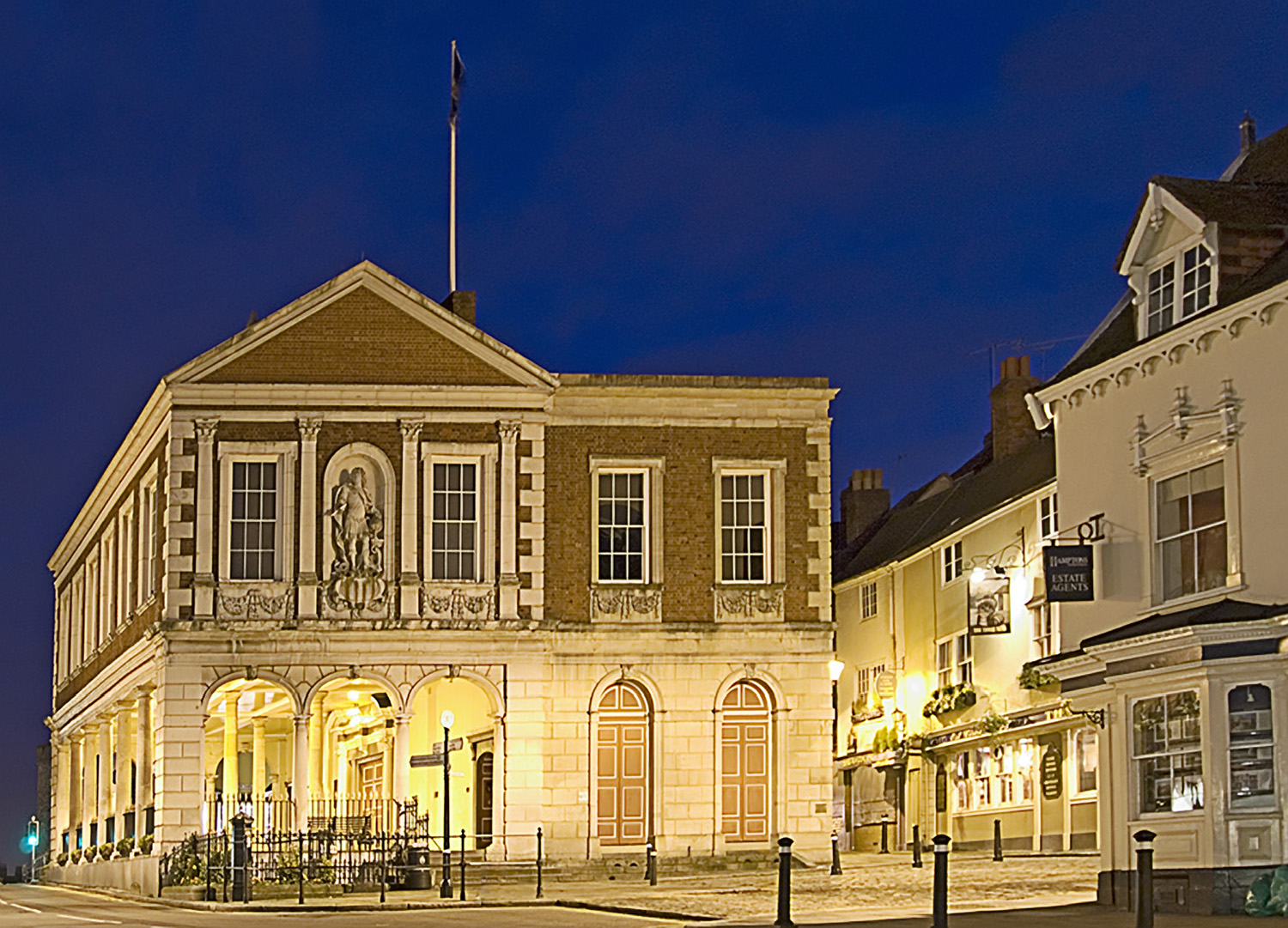
- South side of Windsor Guildhall showing the Cornmarket, with the statue of Prince George above, and the 1829 extension on the right.

- Location within Berkshire
- 51°28′56″N 0°36′25″W
- Location: Windsor, Berkshire, England

History
- Built: 1689

Site notes
- Architect: Sir Thomas Fitz
- Architectural style: 17th century

Listed Building – Grade I
- Designated: 4 January 1950
- Reference no.: 1117752

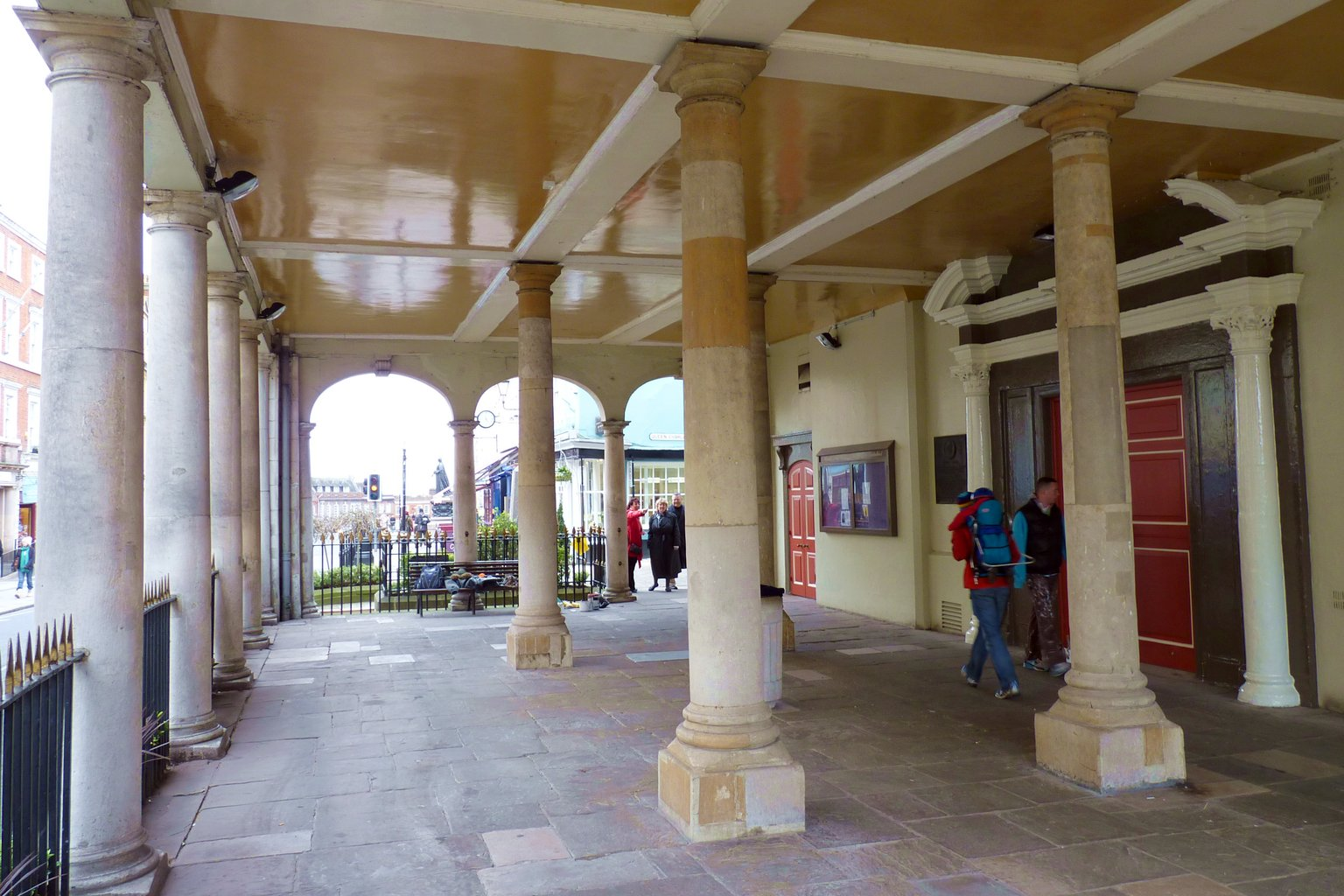
The former covered corn market; the full image shows the apparent gaps at the top of four inside columns.

The Windsor Guildhall is the town hall of Windsor, Berkshire, England. A Grade I listed building, it is situated in the High Street, approximately 100 metres (330 feet) from Castle Hill, which leads to the main public entrance to Windsor Castle.

== History ==
A deed of 1369, now in the possession of Eton College, refers to the 'gildaule', and a charter of 1439 states that "pleas happening in the said borough ... shall be pleaded and holden in the guildhall there, before the mayor and bailiffs for the time being". A set of statutes and ordinances for the Guildhall were published in 1579 to 1580, and confirmed by the Berkshire justices in 1592.

Norden's map of 1607 shows a market house in the location of the present guildhall: the main part of it is raised on wooden pillars to allow the space beneath to be used as a covered corn market.

The erection of the present guildhall was begun in 1687, under the direction of Sir Thomas Fitz (Fitch or Fiddes), but the story is that on his death in 1689, the task was taken over and completed by Sir Christopher Wren. The cost of construction was £2687/1s/6d. The new building was supported by stone columns, like its predecessor. This allowed for corn markets to be held in the covered area. It has been told for many years that Wren was asked to insert additional columns to support the weight of the heavy building above; Wren supposedly did not believe they were necessary and made them slightly short, so that they do not quite touch the ceiling. However, there is little evidence that Wren was ever involved with the design or construction of the Guildhall. It is now believed that the story grew out of Wren's connections with Windsor, along with the actions of his son, also called Christopher Wren. The younger Wren served as a Member of Parliament for Windsor, and commissioned the statue of Prince George of Denmark in 1713 on the south end of the building with his name engraved underneath. The pillars were probably moved into the corn market from the east-side when the extension was added in 1829. The gaps at the top of the pillars are now filled with tiles smaller than the capitals. A statue of Queen Anne was commissioned by the council in 1708 on the north side of the building.

The 1829 extension was a two-storey building at the back of the existing hall, designed by James Bedborough. Major restorations of the building were undertaken in 1851, and, following its use as a food office during the Second World War, again in 1950–1951. The restored building was reopened during the Festival of Britain by Princess Elizabeth (future Queen Elizabeth II). The guildhall was a facility for dispensing justice, and Quarter Sessions were held there until 1971.

Since the formation of the Royal Borough of Windsor and Maidenhead in 1974, the guildhall has been used by the borough council for ceremonies and committee meetings. On 9 April 2005, the civil marriage ceremony of the wedding of Prince Charles and Camilla Parker Bowles took place there, and, on 21 December 2005, it hosted one of the first same-sex civil partnership ceremonies to be held in England, that of Sir Elton John and his long-time partner David Furnish. On 12 March 2011, the new Windsor and Royal Borough Museum was officially opened in the Guildhall by Queen Elizabeth II.

== See also ==
- Guild
- Guildhall
