= Anna Valentine =

British fashion designer

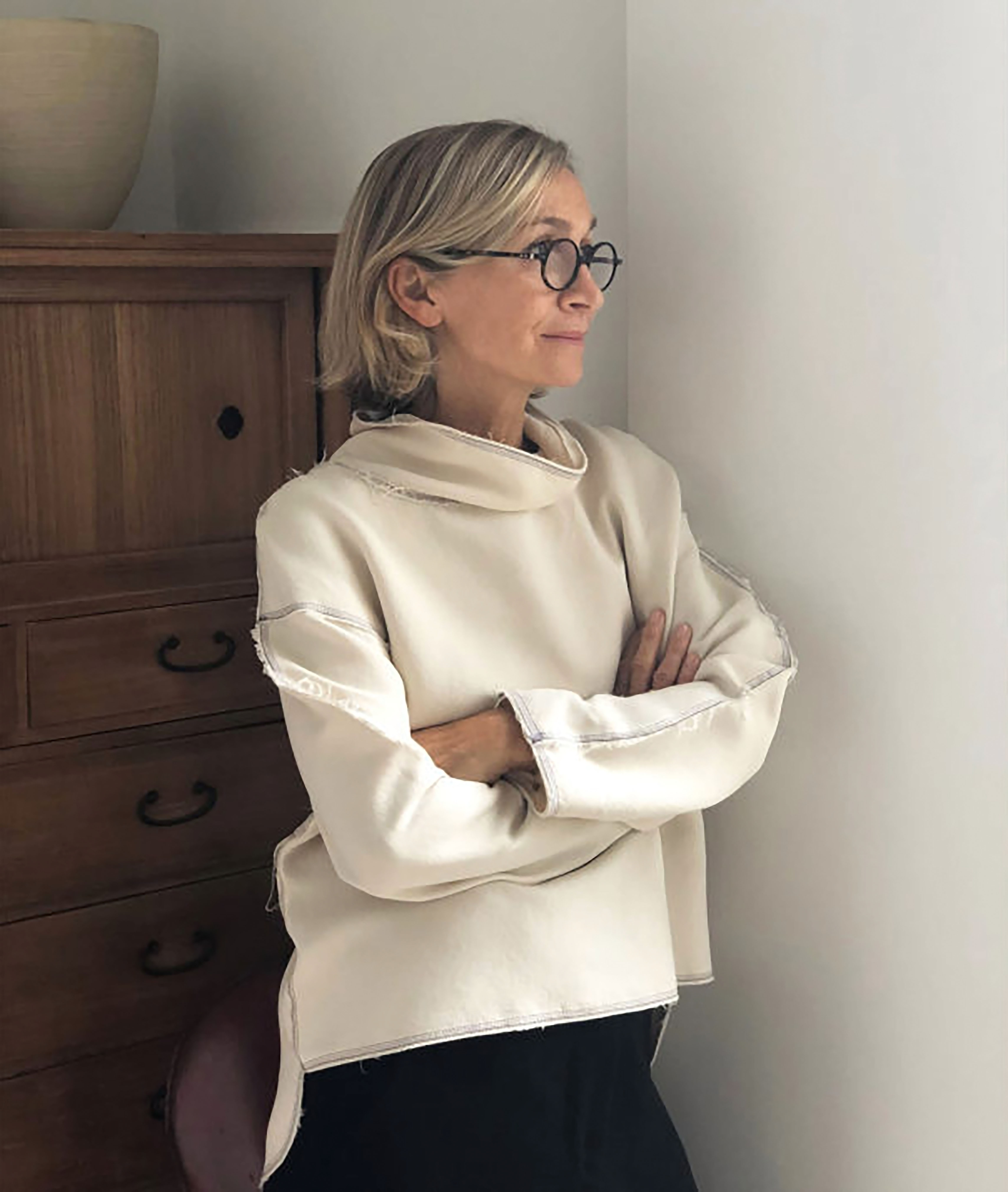
- Occupation: Fashion designer
- Website: www.annavalentine.com

Anna Valentine is a British fashion designer based out of her atelier in Marylebone, London.

== Early life and education ==
Anna Valentine was born September 1963 in Bedford, Bedfordshire and was educated at Dr Challoner's Grammar School, Buckinghamshire.

== Career ==
Valentine's early career was as a ballet dancer.

In 1986 Valentine started designing clothes with her then business partner, Antonia Robinson, under the name Robinson Valentine, supported by the enterprise allowance scheme. Since 2005 Valentine has operated under her own label, Anna Valentine.

In 2006 Valentine moved her atelier to Marylebone, arranged over four floors in a former grain store where she is able to have her showrooms, design team, seamstresses and artisans under one roof.

Valentine “learned on the job, spending hours perfecting her technique, before setting up her own couture and ready-to-wear label. Working with a team of in-house designers, pattern cutters, fitters and seamstresses, she has achieved success over the past three decades, most notably designing the wedding outfit for the Duchess of Cornwall, now Queen Camilla.”

Valentine’s designs are described as "timeless classic clothing with a modern twist".

“The simplicity is deceptive…an effortless sophistication born of over 30 years of couture”

Notable clients include Queen Camilla, Kristin Scott Thomas, Lesley Manville, Ruth Wilson, Gillian Anderson, Dame Judi Dench, Jodie Whittaker and Anne Robinson.

In December 2024 Anna Valentine was granted a royal warrant of appointment by Queen Camilla.

== Philanthropy ==
Valentine has supported the Great Ormond Street Hospital Children's Charity, Reach Leukaemia Appeal and Maggie's Cancer Caring Centres through charity fashion shows.
