= Fashion of Catherine, Princess of Wales =

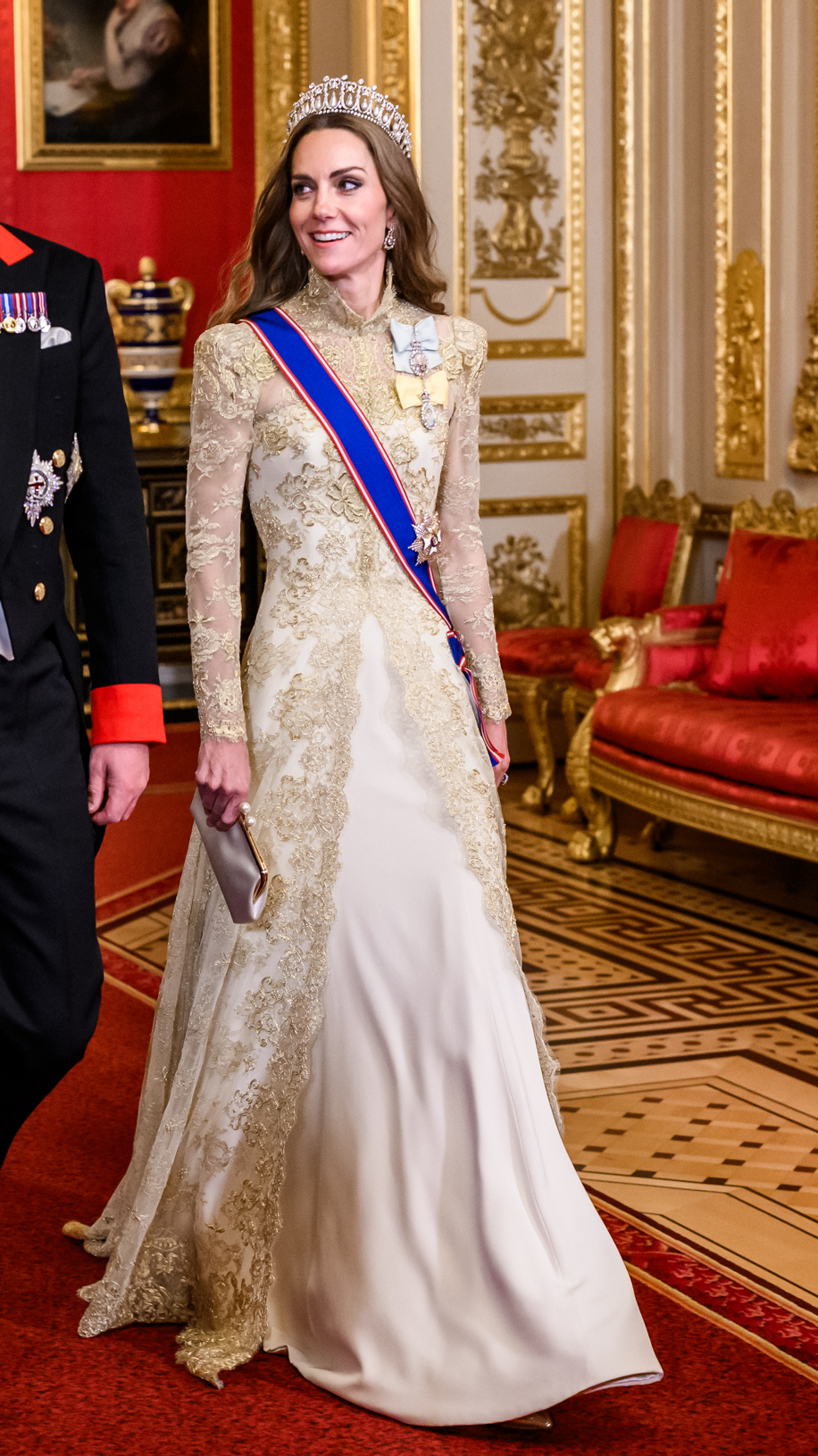
Catherine, Princess of Wales wearing a Chantilly lace and silk crepe couture gown by British designer Phillipa Lepley

The fashion of Catherine, Princess of Wales, has influenced clothing sales and consumer behaviour in the United Kingdom and beyond since her relationship with Prince William became public in 2004. She has been featured in best-dressed lists in magazines such as Vanity Fair and Tatler. Catherine's wardrobe combines pieces from the Alexander McQueen fashion house and Jenny Packham with high-street brands such as Zara, Reiss, and Hobbs.

Garments worn by Catherine are often reported to sell out shortly after, a phenomenon dubbed the "Kate effect". (Note: Initially, the media reported her first name as "Kate", a diminutive of "Catherine". Despite later changes to her titles, the public continued to use "Kate Middleton".) In 2016, Catherine appeared on the cover of British Vogue's centenary issue. Her fashion choices continue to attract global media attention.

== Clothes ==
=== Pre-royal life ===
Catherine Middleton reportedly caught the attention of Prince William during a charity fashion show at the University of St Andrews, while wearing a sheer, lingerie-style, strapless dress on the catwalk, which had originally been designed as a skirt by Charlotte Todd. The dress sold for £78,000 (£110,000 in 2024) at an auction in 2011. Catherine's fashion received significant media attention following the public revelation of their relationship in 2004. She was followed by paparazzi in her daily life, and her style was frequently photographed and featured in the press.

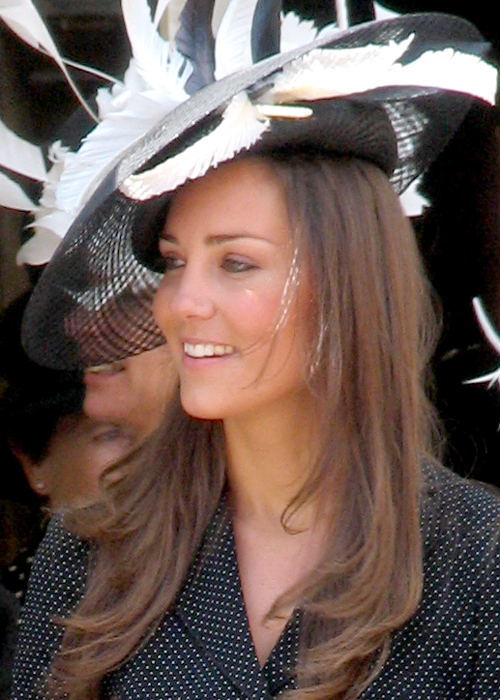
At William's Order of the Garter investiture in 2008, Catherine wore a Philip Somerville hat.

During her university years, Catherine was photographed wearing evening outfits such as sequinned dresses. Her influence was evident when a £40 Topshop dress, which she was photographed wearing in 2007, promptly sold out. She also wore pieces from Jigsaw before she worked there as an accessories buyer. Catherine was credited with contributing to a Sloane Ranger revival, although scholars noted that her middle-class background differed from the traditional image associated with the style. Her skiwear was described by the press as "safe", "sporty" and "sensible". During this period, Catherine was also photographed in overcoats and a tweed outfit. In 2007, Oliver Marre of The Guardian referred to Catherine as a "fashion icon". In 2008, Elle called Catherine a fashionable tastemaker and praised her "to-the-knee pencil skirts and Philip Treacy hats".

For the announcement of her engagement to William in November 2010, Catherine wore a blue dress by Issa, which sold out within minutes and drew widespread attention to the brand. The couple married in a widely televised ceremony on 29 April 2011. She wore a white wedding gown designed by Sarah Burton for Alexander McQueen, featuring lace appliqué, a long train and floral motifs, combining traditional elements with modernity. Her wedding dress received positive reactions from fashion commentators and was described as classic and timeless. It was also compared to earlier royal bridal styles, with commentators describing it as reminiscent of Grace Kelly's wedding dress and noting similarities in the lace, train and classic style of the wedding dress of Elizabeth II, William's grandmother. Her bouquet also followed a royal wedding tradition by including a sprig of myrtle, a custom that originated with Queen Victoria.

=== Royal life ===
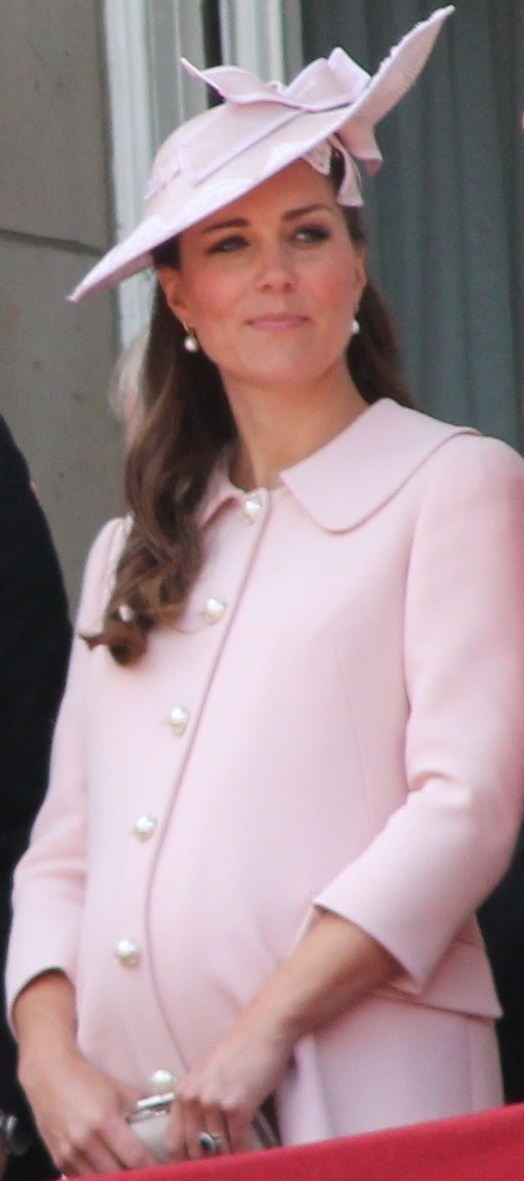
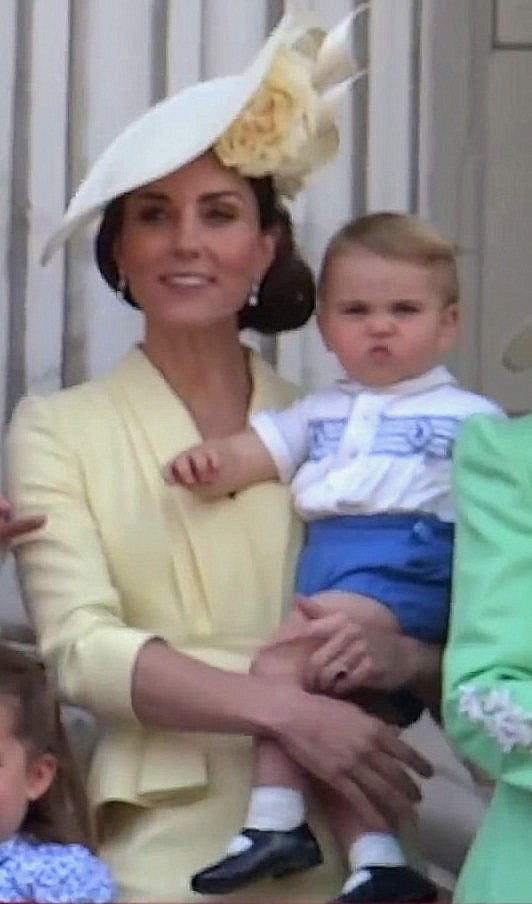
Catherine wore dresses designed by Alexander McQueen at Trooping the Colour in 2013 and 2019 respectively.

The Alexander McQueen fashion house has been a frequent choice for Catherine since her wedding. She has worn its designs to several annual events including Trooping the Colour, Royal Ascot and the British Academy Film Awards, as well as state banquets and receptions. Catherine frequently wore nude court shoes in the early years of her marriage and has been credited with helping to popularise the style. She has frequently worn coatdresses and tailored outerwear for engagements. She has worn more casual items such as waxed jackets, lavallière blouses, blazers and skinny jeans. Her more recent style has been described as more informal, in contrast to the more refined looks she favoured in her early years. Catherine has worn dresses by Catherine Walker, a designer favoured by William's mother, Diana, Princess of Wales, and by Jenny Packham, whose designs she wore for her first black tie appearance as a royal in 2011.

Writers have often compared Catherine's fashion with that of Diana. Many commentators have highlighted instances where Catherine's outfits resembled Diana's, noting similarities in colour and styling. The Daily Telegraph observed parallels between Catherine's 2011 wedding-era ensembles and Diana's early public looks. Harper's Bazaar compared her 2019 Order of the Garter attire with Diana's 1995 appearance, and described a grey coatdress and pearl earrings as reminiscent of Diana's 1989 Dartmouth outfit. Vogue has also described Catherine's choices as frequently echoing Diana's style.

In June 2016, Catherine took part in a magazine shoot for British Vogue's centenary issue and appeared on its cover. The shoot took place on the Sandringham Estate; Catherine was involved in selecting her wardrobe of "off-duty jeans and shirts" reflecting her love of the countryside. The spread was described by Vogue as among its most personal and natural royal portraits. The photoshoot was done in collaboration with her patronage, the National Portrait Gallery, where two pictures from the shoot were displayed. At the 71st British Academy Film Awards, Catherine wore a dark green gown with a black sash and handbag. Some commentators suggested that the black sash may have referenced the black dress code observed for the Time's Up campaign, while keeping within royal protocol that discourages involvement in political campaigns.

Catherine has developed a wardrobe suited to engagements such as hospital and school visits, often featuring tailored pieces in bright colours; The Daily Telegraph's fashion director Bethan Holt describes this as a smart and approachable appearance. She has worn several high-street brands during official engagements and projects, including Hobbs, Boden and Zara.

Catherine has frequently re-worn outfits during public appearances, a practice described in commentary as sustainable or practical. She has re-worn pieces with symbolic value, such as a Jenny Packham gown and a Catherine Walker coat, and has recycled long-held favourites including a Reiss coat and Penelope Chilvers boots. She has also worn pieces from environmentally conscious labels such as Beulah London, Stella McCartney, Monica Vinader and Gabriela Hearst.

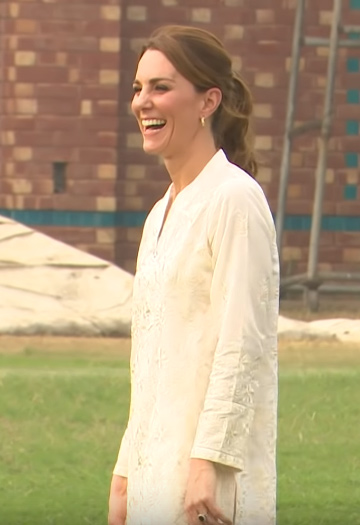
Catherine in a white embroidered shalwar kameez by Gul Ahmed in Pakistan, 2019

Catherine is known for symbolic dressing on official overseas visits, often incorporating elements that reflect the host nation's culture and values, a practice described by Elizabeth Holmes as "sartorial diplomacy". For example, on a 2019 visit to Pakistan, she wore a traditional shalwar kameez by local designers; Holmes notes that her wardrobe on the tour was "almost exclusively inspired by local attire". In Paris in 2017, she wore Chanel and Cartier in tribute to French fashion. She is also known for wearing colours reflecting national flags during overseas visits and events with visiting foreign leaders, occasionally coordinating her children's outfits as well. Natasha Archer, Catherine's longtime executive assistant, is widely credited with coordinating her wardrobe for royal tours and engagements; she left the role in 2025 to establish a styling consultancy.

== Jewellery ==
William proposed to Catherine with Diana's sapphire engagement ring, and Catherine has revealed that they share the same ring size. Catherine has since worn several pieces of Diana’s jewellery, including earrings worn by Diana on the July 1994 cover of Vogue; diamond and pearl-drop earrings associated with Diana at the coronation of William's father, King Charles III; double-drop sapphire earrings at the 2022 Trooping the Colour during the Platinum Jubilee; and a four-row pearl choker, worn by Diana at a state banquet in 1982, at the funerals of William's grandparents Prince Philip and Queen Elizabeth II.

As of 2025, Catherine has worn five tiaras, including the Cartier Halo Tiara, which she wore on her wedding day, and Queen Mary's Lover's Knot Tiara.

== Influence and recognition ==
Catherine has been described as a globally influential figure in fashion. The "Kate effect" refers to the impact of her clothing choices on the sales of particular products and brands. Her outfits have often been reported to sell out shortly after she wears them, and scholars have examined the "Kate effect" as the wider influence of Catherine's choices on consumer behaviour. In 2018, Vanity Fair described Catherine as "the most powerful royal fashion influencer", citing a Brand Finance study that found items she wears increase desirability among 38 per cent of American shoppers. In 2021, Bethan Holt wrote that estimates of the value added by Catherine to the industry "vary wildly, with figures between £152 million and £1 billion being mooted".

Catherine has frequently appeared on "best-dressed" lists. People featured Middleton on its 2007 best-dressed list. She was recognised as one of Richard Blackwell's fabulous fashion independents in 2007. In January 2012, the Headwear Association recognised her as the "Hat Person of the Year". In July 2008 Vanity Fair included her on its international best-dressed list. She also topped the magazine's annual best-dressed list for a second time in 2012 and appeared as its cover star in September that year. Catherine was named in the International Best Dressed Hall of Fame List in 2014.

In 2018, Tatler named her on its list of Britain's best-dressed people, praising her for "recycling her looks, rather than wearing them as one-offs", as well as her use of "both high-street and high-end brands". She topped the magazine's best-dressed list in 2022 and 2026, and was ranked first on its list of the most glamorous European royals in 2024. In 2024, The Daily Telegraph named her among the best-dressed men and women of the summer. British Vogue named her an "Eternal Influencer" and included her among the 50 best-dressed Britons in 2025.

Jess Cartner-Morley of The Guardian praised her ensemble at the Platinum Jubilee of Elizabeth II. An article in Tatler described her as the "queen of quiet luxury", noting how her preference for understated, high-quality pieces has set a new standard for modern royal dressing. Vanessa Friedman of The New York Times remarked that Catherine's coronation attire was highly symbolic and used fashion as a form of visual communication. While reception has generally been positive, some commentators have offered more critical assessments of her style; for example, Janet Street-Porter described her as the "Duchess of Drab", while Shobhaa De criticised aspects of her wardrobe during the 2016 tour of India and Bhutan.

In February 2025, a Kensington Palace source told The Times that Catherine preferred media focus on her causes rather than her clothing. Details of her outfits are no longer routinely issued to the press.
