= Wedding dress of Princess Elizabeth of the United Kingdom =

Dress worn by Princess Elizabeth at her wedding to Philip Mountbatten in 1947

- Designer: Norman Hartnell
- Year: 1947
- Type: White bridal dress
- Material: Satin

The wedding dress of Princess Elizabeth (the future Queen Elizabeth II), was worn at her wedding to Philip, Duke of Edinburgh on 20 November 1947 in Westminster Abbey. Given the rationing of clothing at the time, she still had to purchase the material using ration coupons. The dress was designed by Norman Hartnell. Hartnell's signature was said to be embroidery, and he enjoyed "working with soft, floating fabrics, particularly tulle and chiffon, and with plain, lustrous silks". The dress was made of Chinese silk, with a high neckline, tailored bodice and a short train. Without straps and with long sleeves, it provided a "fit and flare silhouette".

== Design ==
The wedding was a royal event held following the end of the Second World War. The dress, designed by the Court Designer Norman Hartnell, had a star-patterned fan-shaped bridal train that was 13 feet (4.0 m) in length. The train, symbolic of rebirth and growth after the war, was stated to be inspired by Botticelli's c. 1482 painting of Primavera, particularly the elaborate embroidery motifs of scattered flowers on the rich satin dress and the tulle veil worn by the royal bride. The material used was ivory silk and a diamond fringe tiara secured her veil. The dress was decorated with crystals and 10,000 seed pearls, imported from the United States of America. Hartnell, who had been Court Designer since 1938, claimed it as "the most beautiful dress I had so far made".

On account of the austerity measures following the war, Princess Elizabeth had to use clothing ration coupons to show her entitlement to the dress. The government allowed her 200 extra ration coupons. She was given hundreds of clothing coupons by brides-to-be from all parts of the country to help her acquire the dress. She had to return these coupons as it was illegal for them to have been given away in the first instance.

The designs for the dress were approved three months before the wedding. Hartnell's search for suitable designs in London art galleries had led to him to the Botticelli figure. This was the inspiration for the use of ivory silk with flower designs of jasmine, smilax, lilac and white rose-like blossoms added to the train, embellished by white crystals and pearls. These motifs were transferred to drawings to enable embroidery experts to work on them. The dress featured a "heart-shaped neckline and long tight sleeves".

The silk cloth was chosen at the specific directive of her mother, the Queen, who desired an "unusually rich, lustrous stiff satin which was made at Lullingstone Castle". The silkworms to manufacture the silk were bought from Nationalist China, and not from Japan and Italy, the UK's enemies during the war. Satin was chosen for the train, and a more flexible material of the same tone as the train was chosen for the dress. However, in spite of the careful choice of the silk, the curator of the London Museum observed 30 years later when the dress was on display at the museum that "the choice of silk was not a good one" as the fabric had deteriorated considerably due to being weighted with tin salts, effectively rotting the fabric. It was also noted that the "weight of the embroidery dragged the skirt down, increasing the strain on the weave." Round the hem of the dress, "a border of orange blossom was appliqued with transparent tulle outlined in seed pearls and crystal".

The final design of the dress was kept secret, although much speculation surrounded it. It was said the princess feared that if details were published fashion house copies would make it impossible for her to make last-minute design alterations. The dress was taken to the palace a day before the wedding in a 4-foot (1.2 m) box. On the wedding day, the dress glittered, bejewelled with pearls "skilfully combined with flowing lines of wheat ears, the symbol of fertility, and worked in pearl and diamante."

== Similarities ==
Princess Elizabeth's wedding dress has drawn parallels with both the similarly designed dress worn by Grace Kelly in 1956 and the "Westminster décor" wedding dress that Sarah Burton at Alexander McQueen designed for Catherine Middleton; particular points of similarity have been highlighted in the pleats and silhouette of the skirt.

The dress was put on display at St James's Palace and was then exhibited in the major cities and towns of the UK.

== See also ==
- Coronation gown of Elizabeth II
- List of individual dresses
