= The Liz Taylor Ring =

2022 novel by Brenda Janowitz

- Author: Brenda Janowitz
- Language: English
- Genre: Domestic fiction
- Publisher: Graydon House
- Publication date: February 1, 2022
- Publication place: United States
- Pages: 384
- ISBN: 1-5258-0647-5
- Preceded by: The Grace Kelly Dress
- Followed by: The Audrey Hepburn Estate

The Liz Taylor Ring is a 2022 novel by Brenda Janowitz. It was published by Graydon House.

== Critical reception ==
Kirkus Reviews called it a, "fun, flirty, well-paced sibling-inheritance story".

It was also reviewed by Library Journal, Booklist, and Marion Winik for Newsday.
