= DiSanto =

DiSanto (or Di Santo) is an Italian surname. Notable people with the surname include:

- Celina Di Santo (born 2000), Argentine field hockey player
- Francesco Disanto (born 1994), Italian footballer
- Franco Di Santo (born 1989), Argentine footballer
- Grace DiSanto (1924-1993), American poet
- Ines Di Santo (born c. 1952), Italian-Argentine designer
- John DiSanto, American politician
- Lautaro Disanto (born 1998), Argentine footballer
- Ludovico Di Santo (born 1977), Argentine actor
- Lynne DiSanto, American politician
- Michael di Santo (born 1989), American rower
- Tony DiSanto, American businessman

== See also ==
- DiSanto Field
