= Betty Holmes =

Betty Holmes may refer to:

- Betty Holmes, married name of Elizabeth Ripper (1909–2004), Australian geologist
- Betty Holmes, birth name of Camille Souter (1929–2023), Irish artist

== See also ==
- Beth Holmes
- Elizabeth Holmes
- Elizabeth Holmes (writer)
- Elisabeth Holmes Moore
