= Engagement dress of Catherine Middleton =

- Designer: Daniella Issa Helayel
- Year: 2010
- Type: Blue silk jersey

Catherine Middleton wore a blue Issa dress during the photocall for her engagement to Prince William of Wales on 16 November 2010, at St. James's Palace. The silk wrap dress matched her engagement ring, and sold out soon after its debut. It contributed to the start of "the Kate Middleton effect", Middleton's impact on the fashion industry, and sparked a trend in "little blue dresses".

== Background ==
Brazilian-born London designer Daniella Issa Helayel had been producing form-fitting dresses under her eponymous Issa London label since 2001. In 2011, Issa was considered a "go-to" designer for fashionable London public figures, including Princess Beatrice, Princess Eugenie, Pippa Middleton and Keira Knightley. In the years leading up to her engagement, the Middleton sisters wore several of Issa's silk jersey dresses to public events and formal occasions. Middleton would often visit Helayel's studio, having pieces custom-fitted. The dress had no name, and was known by the style number DJ157. Helayel stated that it was "the original Issa dress", based on a gown that belonged to her grandmother. Middleton purchased her engagement dress from the Issa concession at Fenwick's Bond Street store.

== Design and Middleton's debut ==
The engagement was announced in November 2010. The couple posed for the press at St. James's Palace on 16 November, where the piece was photographed. The dress is a sapphire, (Note: The dress has been described in colour as "sapphire" "navy", and "royal blue".) tight fitting, long-sleeved, low-cut silk wrap dress with a gathered front, described as "one of Issa's classic silk jersey dresses". The deep blue colour of the gown complemented the shade of the engagement ring, which had previously belonged to Diana, Princess of Wales. Middleton paired the wrap dress with her engagement ring, a set of sapphire cabochon earrings and a necklace, and black pumps.

Her fiancé, Prince William, wore a complementary navy suit with a burgundy tie. The event was Middleton's formal introduction to the press, and regarded as her "transition" from commoner into royal life before her marriage. Helayel told People that she was elated that Middleton had decided to wear her dress for the engagement announcement, stating she was thrilled with the engagement news and I'm very happy that she has chosen to wear Issa today... [s]he is a very pretty and lovely girl."'

== Reception and influence ==
The dress, worth £385, sold out within hours of its debut in both the U.K and the U.S. Vogue wrote that the piece became an "overnight sensation" after photos of Middleton's engagement circulated worldwide. In New York City, where the dress retails for about $615, a buyer for an Issa retailer stated "People are going crazy for this dress... We have a wait list growing by the day." The high street "became awash with copies" of the gown. Middleton's look was credited with increasing attention on Issa's designs during London Fashion Week in 2011. A new tartan was created by McCalls Highlandwear, named "Royal Pride", inspired by the dress. Several publications speculated that Issa was a contender to design Middleton's wedding gown. The dress's popularity helped boost sales by 45% for the Issa London label. As a result of unprecedented demand, Issa went "into administration" after having difficulty coping with the amount of orders, before relaunching in 2015 with House of Fraser. The dress, named "The Kate Tie Wrap Dress", is now sold in various different colours, and retails for £99.

Vanity Fair referred to the dress as "iconic" and "unforgettable". StyleCaster labelled it among the most iconic dresses of 2010. The Daily Telegraph opined that the design underscored Middleton's "youthful elegance". The Guardian noted that Middleton had chosen a similar color to Diana's engagement outfit, with both dresses chosen to match the ring. After her engagement appearance, Glamour reported that "the princess-to-be is already well on her way to becoming a serious trendsetter." Middleton was reported to have replaced Lady Gaga as the top online fashion search phrase. The Daily Beast credited Middleton and Issa with an "aesthetic shift in British fashion" toward polished, "scrubbed-up", "attractive" trends, as opposed to previous grunge fashion inspired by Kate Moss. In 2019 The Telegraph wrote that the dress had been one of her "most memorable and significant fashion choices". The dress and its impact was described as the start of "the Kate effect", her reported impact on fashion and style.

=== "Little Blue Dress" trend ===
Middleton's blue dress sparked a trend in "little blue dresses," as a more colourful alternative to the famous little black dress. According to Glamour contributing style editor Tracey Lomrantz, "Women saw (Middleton's iridescent Issa dress) and thought, 'I want to look like her.'" The colour, with hues ranging "from iris to cerulean, navy to indigo and everything between", was spotted across the runways and retailers after the engagement announcement. Celebrities such as Tia Carrere, Kristen Bell, and Amy Smart were all spotted in shades of blue on the red carpet during the Spring 2011 season.

== See also ==
- Fashion of Catherine, Princess of Wales
- Wedding dress of Catherine Middleton
- List of individual dresses
