= Weighted silk =

Silk treated to restore weight lost in degumming with metallic salts

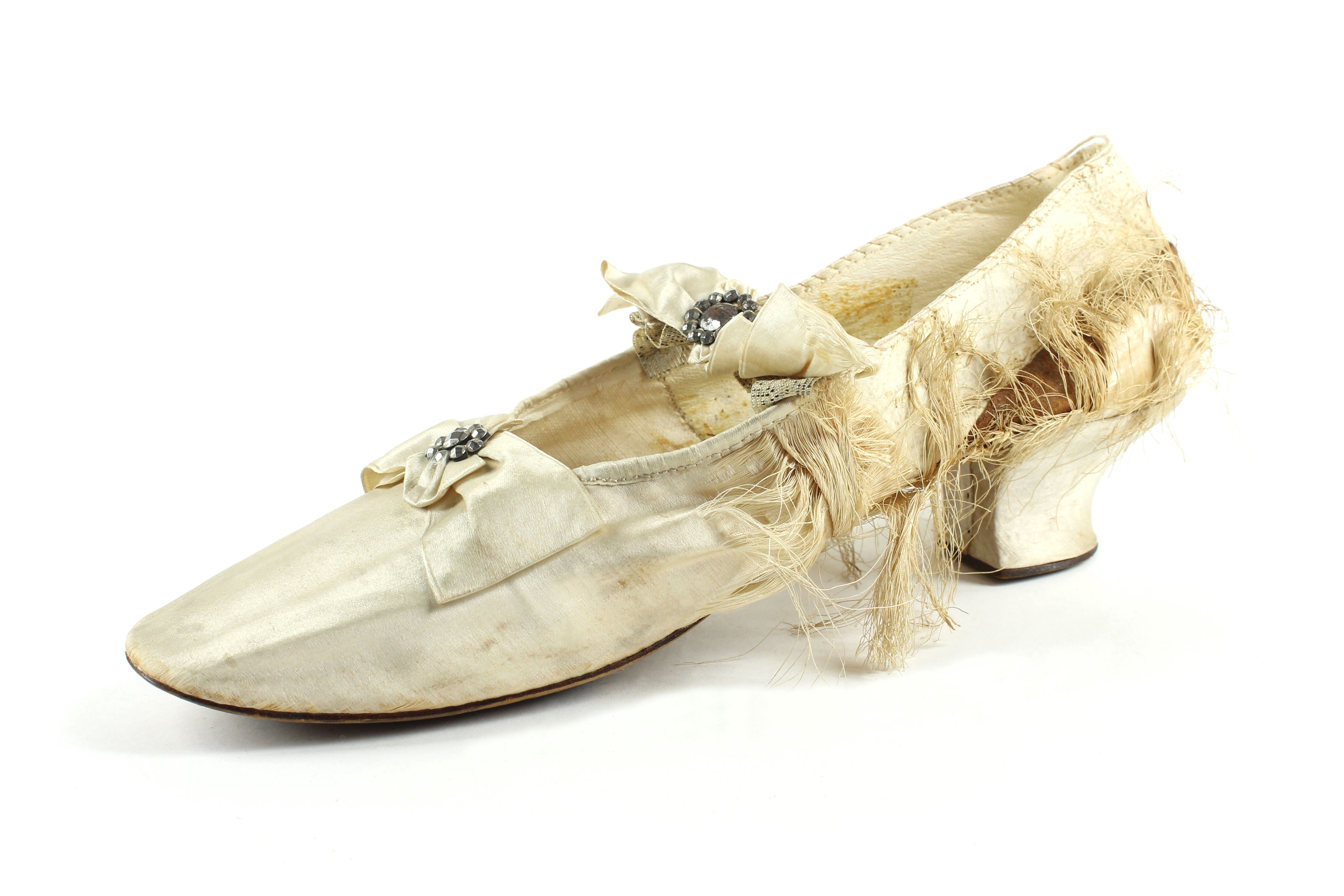
Late 19th century shoe covered in shattering silk. The weft threads were made from weighted silk which has shattered, leaving the warp threads intact.

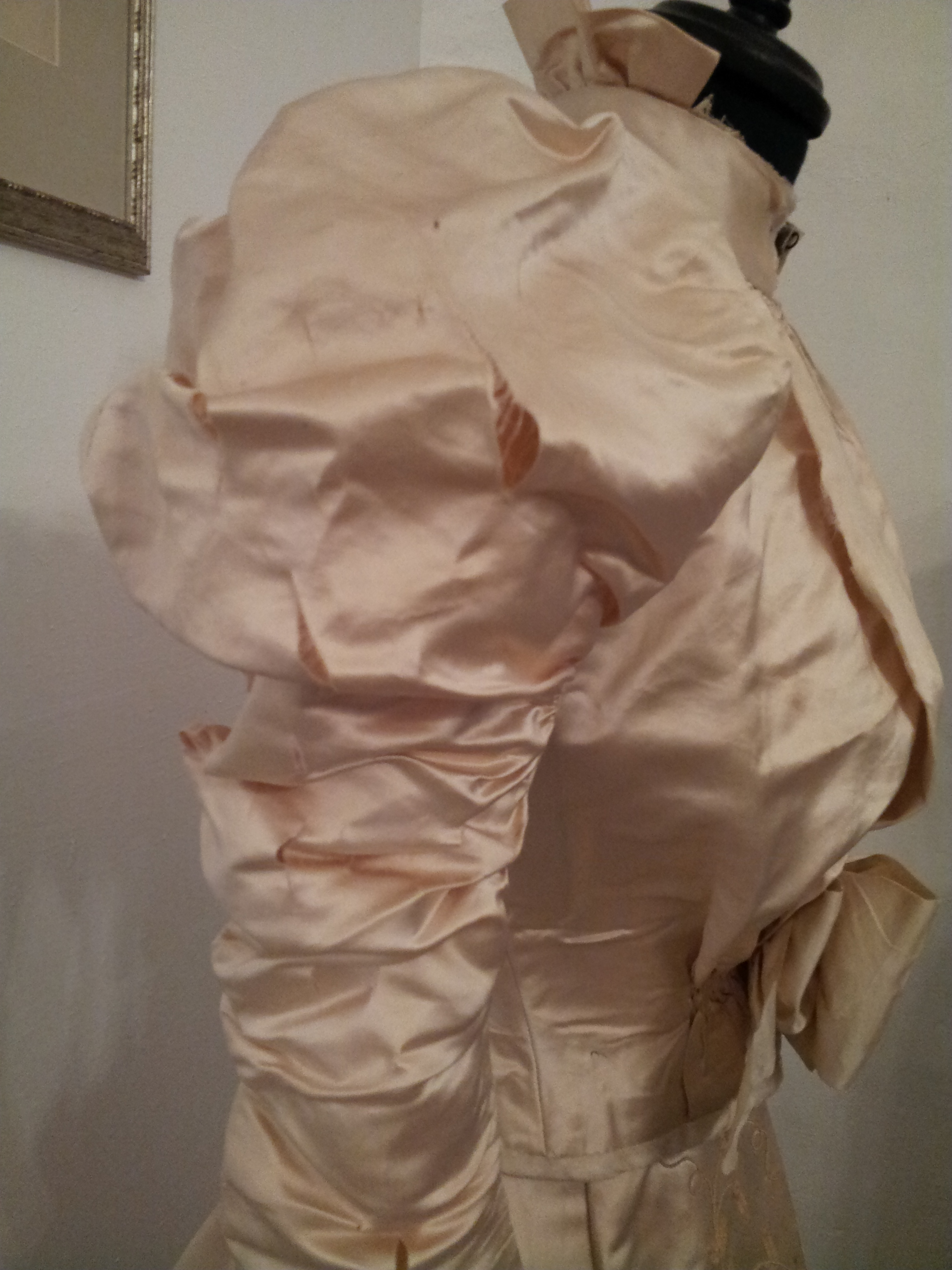
1890s wedding dress made from weighted silk. The splits and damage visible on the sleeve, where the silk fibres have literally 'shattered', have been contributed to in part by the weighting process of the fabric.

Weighted silk is silk which has been treated to restore or increase the weight lost during the process of degumming. This processing started in the 19th century, with vegetable-based solutions such as tannins or sugar. Chemical solutions based upon salts of lead or tin were then used, as well as silicate, phosphate of soda, and astringent extracts. These increased the weight considerably, but led to accusations of adulteration as the properties of the silk were impaired.

== Process and history ==
Unlike most fabric/yard goods which are sold by the yard (or metre), silk is sold to the wholesaler by weight; however, as the first step in processing silk fibre is to "degum" it - removing the sericin from the fibre, a protein naturally produced by silkworms that coats silkworm cocoons - approximately one-fifth of the weight of silk fibre is lost, representing a significant drop in the saleable price of processed silk fibre. As such, silk fabric manufacturers would historically "replace" this lost weight with a 'filler', which would add weight to the fibre and thus make up the cost.

Silk has an affinity for several metallic salts, the most common of which being iron, lead, and tin. It was discovered to be an easy process to return this weight lost in the degumming process by soaking the fibre in a bath of these metallic salts. This process was called 'weighting', and by increasing the weight of the raw silk, the merchant increased their profits. Weighting with some metallic salts did improve the drapeability of silk fabrics; however, merchants soon began adding more weight than the lost one-fifth, with the final weight of the fabric sometimes increased tenfold.

In 1938, the U.S. Federal Trade Commission ruled that silk that weighed more than 10%, and black silk that weighted more than 15%, must be labeled 'Weighted Silk'.

While silk is a strong and durable fibre, the weighting process is highly damaging to the finished fabric and resulting garments. If the garment is worn, it wears out quickly and is highly susceptible to damage from perspiration, salt, and tears; if stored away, it becomes brittle and begins to shatter along lines of wear at an expedited rate. The method of storage does not ameliorate the process of damage introduced by the fabric's weighting, with storage in cold, dry and dark areas doing little, or nothing, to prevent further damage.

Examples of antique weighted silks displaying this damage are easily seen, such as in antique American "crazy quilts", where the silk fibres have disintegrated, whilst the cotton and wool fibres remain in good condition, even after 100 years. A later example displaying damage resulting from tin-weighting is the wedding dress of the future Elizabeth II, then Princess Elizabeth of the United Kingdom; the fabric, a tin-weighted Chinese silk chosen especially by Queen Elizabeth the Queen Mother, began to rot just 30 years after the dress had been created, with the weight of the dress' embroidery worsening the fabric's condition further.

The practice of weighting silk was widespread in the 19th century, and decreased somewhat in the 20th, but is still used to some extent. In the early 20th century, fashion trends had changed substantially and heavier silks fell out of popularity. A lighter silk was preferred and thus weighted silks were less used. An alternative to weighted silk is "organic silk", wherein the sericin is not removed from the fibre before processing, and is instead left in.

== See also ==
- Finishing (textiles)
