= The Grace Kelly Dress =

2020 novel by Brenda Janowitz

- Author: Brenda Janowitz
- Language: English
- Genre: Historical fiction
- Publisher: Graydon House
- Publication date: March 3, 2020
- Publication place: United States
- Pages: 336
- ISBN: 1525804596
- Preceded by: The Dinner Party
- Followed by: The Liz Taylor Ring

The Grace Kelly Dress is a 2020 novel by Brenda Janowitz published by Graydon House. It is Janowitz's sixth book and first historical fiction novel.

== Plot summary ==
Set in Paris and New York City and spanning sixty years, the stories of three generations of women are told through their relationships with a dress modeled on Grace Kelly's iconic wedding gown.

== Critical reception ==
The novel was reviewed by Library Journal, Newsday, and other publications.

Samantha Critchell of the Associated Press noted, "Princess Grace and her status as a fashion icon are barely a passing mention" in the novel.

Lynnanne Pearson said in a review for Booklist that it was a "sweet family drama".

Kirkus Reviews said, "The tale touches ever so lightly on weighty issues—drug use and overdoses, death, infidelity, a quest to find a birth mother, and gay rights".

== Film rights ==
The film rights were optioned by Hallmark/Crown Media.
