= The Audrey Hepburn Estate =

2023 novel by Brenda Janowitz

- Author: Brenda Janowitz
- Language: English
- Genre: Romance fiction
- Publisher: Graydon House
- Publication date: April 18, 2023
- Publication place: United States
- Pages: 304
- ISBN: 1-5258-1148-7
- Preceded by: The Liz Taylor Ring

The Audrey Hepburn Estate is a novel by Brenda Janowitz. It was published by Graydon House in 2023. Hepburn's involvement with the Dutch resistance and by the film Sabrina (1954) were some of Janowitz's inspirations for the novel.

== Plot summary ==
When Emma Jansen learns the Long Island estate where she grew up in servants' quarters will be demolished, she returns for a last visit, encountering both Henry, the grandson of the owner, and Leo, the developer who wants to tear down the estate where he, too, previously lived.

== Critical reception ==
Melissa Minsker of Booklist wrote that the book was "romantic, sweeping, and emotional".

Kirkus Reviews called the author's note "fascinating" and said, "although the chemistry between Emma and her two love interests never quite ignites, Emma’s journey to let go of her past and solve the mystery of the estate is full of interesting historical details".

The Audrey Hepburn Estate" by Brenda Janowitz has been selected as the next read for the CBS New York Book Club with Mary Calvi.
