= Hobbs Ltd =

UK women's clothing retailer

Hobbs store in York

Hobbs is a women's clothing, footwear and accessories retailer based in London, UK. It was founded in Hampstead in 1981 as a shoe retailer. Hobbs has stores across the United Kingdom, concession stores in the United States and Germany, and franchise stores in Dubai and Sweden. The online store is operational in 55 countries. Hobbs is popularly associated with mid-market clothing for a customer base that is largely middle-aged and older.

As of June 2025, Hobbs had 157 stores in the United Kingdom, and operated from a range of department stores.

== Origins and history ==
Hobbs store in Reading

Hobbs was established in Hampstead in 1981 by Yoram and Marilyn Anselm, targeting the "average woman between the ages of 20 and 40 interested in clothing". The brand was named after Marilyn Anselm's favourite brand of horsebox. Having studied sculpture at the Central School of Art and Design, Marilyn Anselm said she began designing her own clothes because she was appalled by the lack of quality clothing available in the early 1970s. Hobbs initially produced shoes, with the clothing line introduced in 1986.

The Hobbs online store was launched in the United Kingdom in 2008, and was extended to international customers in 2013. In that year, it was rumoured that the company would be sold, after it employed consultants from Price Waterhouse Coopers and began planning a launch of the brand in China. Its owners, 3i, wrote down the value of the company in January 2014. In the financial year 2014-15, Hobbs suffered pre-tax losses of £15.6 million, after acquiring a new chairman and chief executive during 2014. It closed nine outlets during the period.

== Other markets ==
Hobbs store in Hong Kong

Hobbs launched its US operations at Bloomingdale's in 2014, and as of 2025 had concessions across the Bloomingdales network. In 2015, the team in the Bloomingdales North Michigan Avenue branch received the Bloomingdales "B the Best" Award, as well as the team in the 59th Street store.

Hobbs has four stores in German department stores Wöhrl and SinnLeffers, which opened in 2016.

== Collaborations ==
In 2013, Hobbs launched a licensed collection produced in collaboration with the Historic Royal Palaces. Two collections are now designed and produced each year. In 2015 the collection received an Innovation award for the collaboration between Historic Royal Palaces and Hobbs on Collection No.4. Hobbs also works in collaboration with Smart Works; a charity which seeks to help unemployed women to enter the UK workplace by providing interview clothes, styling advice and interview training.
