= Brenda Janowitz =

American writer and attorney

- Born: June 22, 1973 (age 53); Long Island, U.S.
- Education: Cornell University; Hofstra Law
- Occupation: Author
- Writing career
- Period: 2007–present
- Subject: Fiction
- Website: brendajanowitz.com

Brenda Janowitz (born June 22, 1973) is an American writer and attorney.

== Biography ==
Janowitz was born in the state of New York on June 22, 1973. She is Jewish. She grew up on the South Shore of Long Island; she later used it as the setting for some of her novels.

Janowitz graduated from Cornell University in 1995. She attended law school at Hofstra University. She worked as an attorney for years.

One of Janowitz's favorite books is The Inn at Lake Devine by Elinor Lipman.

She has written articles for The New York Times, Publishers Weekly, The New York Post, Maria Shriver Sunday Paper, The Washington Post, The Sunday Times, Redbook, Salon, Bustle, Popsugar, and Writer's Digest.

In addition to her earlier works such as The Lonely Hearts Club and The Dinner Party, Janowitz has written three novels inspired by stars and films of Hollywood's golden age: The Grace Kelly Dress, The Liz Taylor Ring, and The Audrey Hepburn Estate. Kirkus Reviews called The Liz Taylor Ring "a fun, flirty, well-paced sibling-inheritance story" and called the author's note in The Audrey Hepburn Estate "fascinating".

The Audrey Hepburn Estate" by Brenda Janowitz has been selected as the next read for the CBS New York Book Club with Mary Calvi.

== Selected works ==
- Recipe for a Happy Life. St. Martin's Press, 2013.
- The Lonely Hearts Club. Polis Books, 2014.
- The Dinner Party. St. Martin's Griffin, 2016.
- The Grace Kelly Dress. Graydon House, 2020.
- The Liz Taylor Ring. Graydon House, 2022.
- The Audrey Hepburn Estate. St. Martin's Griffin, 2023.

=== Brooke Miller series ===
- Scot on The Rocks: How I Survived My Ex-Boyfriend's Wedding with My Dignity Ever-So Slightly Intact. Red Dress Ink, 2007.
- Jack with a Twist: Engaging Your Adversary and Other Things They Don't Teach You in Law School. Red Dress Ink, 2008.
- Hollywood Punch. Polis Books, 2014. (novella)
