= Alexander McQueen (fashion house) =

British luxury fashion house

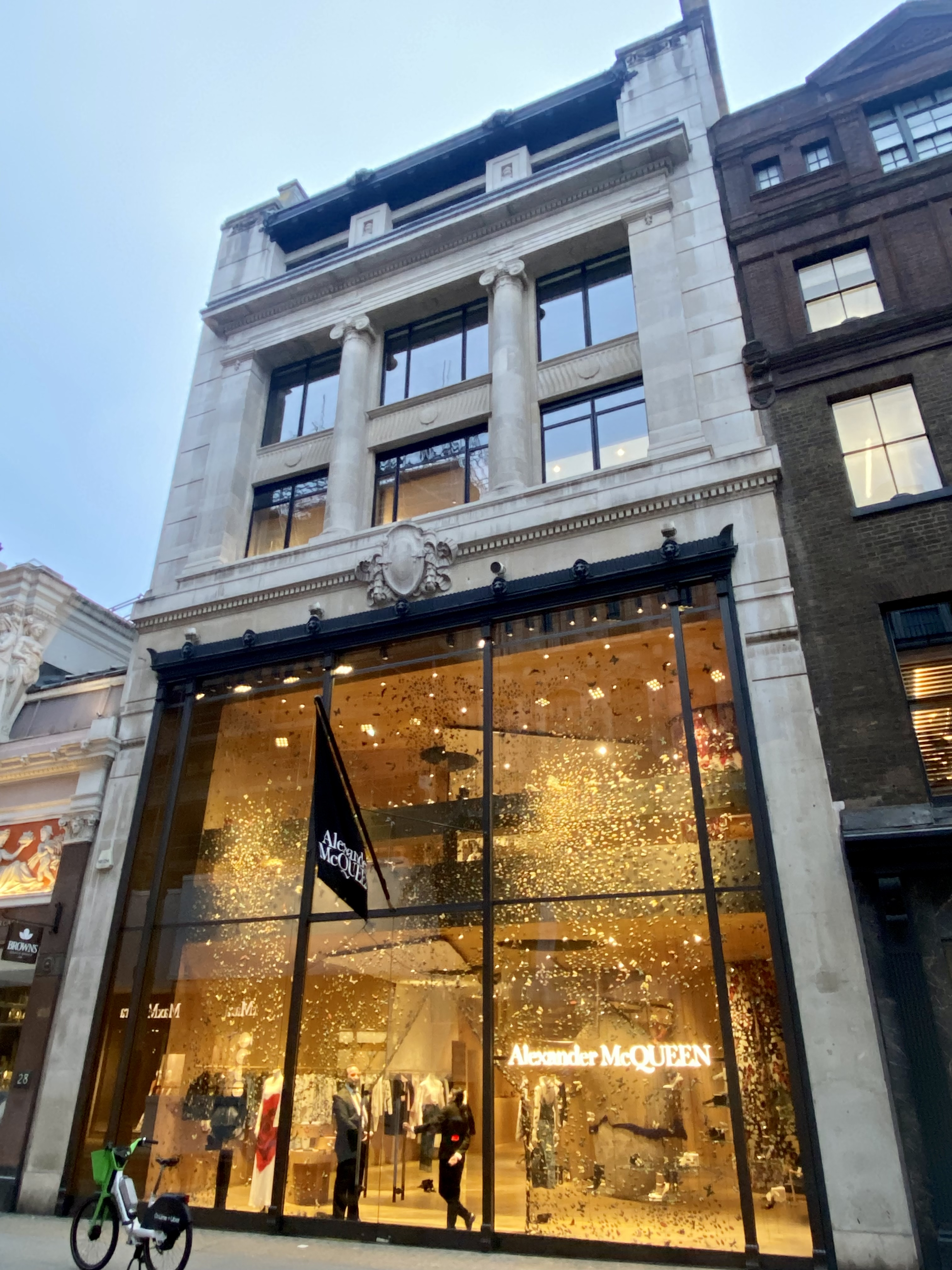
- Store in Mayfair, London
- Type: Subsidiary
- Traded as: Euronext: KER FP
- Industry: Fashion
- Founded: 1992; 34 years ago
- Founder: Alexander McQueen
- Headquarters: London, England
- Number of locations: 106 stores worldwide (2025)
- Key people: Gianfranco D'Attis (CEO); Seán McGirr (creative director)
- Parent: Kering
- Website: alexandermcqueen.com

Alexander McQueen is a British luxury fashion house founded by the designer Alexander McQueen in 1992. After his death in 2010, Sarah Burton became its creative director, a position she held until 2023. Gianfilippo Testa has been its chief executive officer since March 2022 and Seán McGirr has been its creative director since October 2023. The house specialises in couture, ready-to-wear, premium leather accessories, as well as footwear.

== History ==
Alternative original logo as it appears on some boutiques

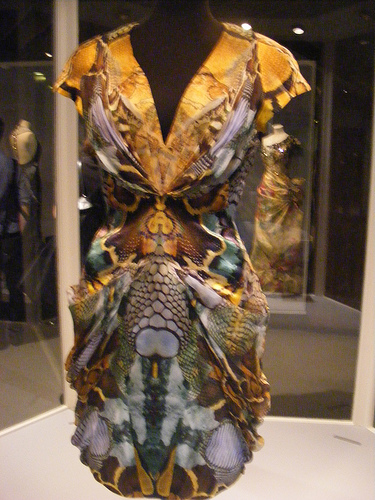
An Alexander McQueen dress from his last show, on display at the Victoria and Albert Museum, London, in 2009

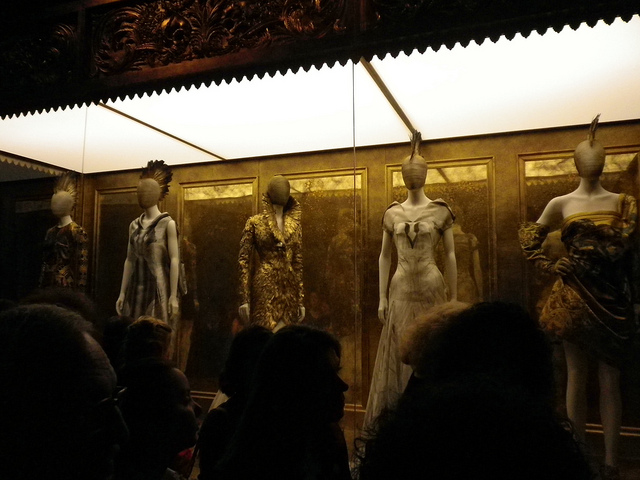
A display from "Savage Beauty", a retrospective of Alexander McQueen designs at the Metropolitan Museum of Art, New York City, 2011

The Alexander McQueen brand was founded by the designer Alexander McQueen in 1992. The house's early collections developed its reputation for controversy and shock tactics (earning the title "l'enfant terrible" and "the hooligan of English fashion"), with trousers aptly named "bumsters" and a collection entitled Highland Rape. McQueen staged lavish and unconventional runway shows, such as a recreation of a shipwreck for his Spring 2003 collection, Spring 2005's human chess game, and the Fall 2006 show, Widows of Culloden, which featured a life-sized hologram of the model Kate Moss dressed in yards of rippling fabric. In total, McQueen designed 36 collections for his London label, including his MA graduate collection.

During his time as head designer, McQueen was awarded the title "British Designer of the Year" four times between 1996 and 2003; he was also appointed a CBE and named International Designer of the Year by the Council of Fashion Designers in 2003.

In December 2000 the Gucci Group acquired 51% of his company and appointed him as Creative Director before launching stores in London, Milan, New York, Los Angeles and Las Vegas. Following the takeover, the brand's catwalk presentations were relocated from London to Paris, beginning with the Spring/Summer 2002 collection with The Dance of The Twisted Bull on 6 October 2001.

Alexander McQueen launched its first menswear collection in Spring/Summer 2005 and continues to show its collections during Milan Fashion Week. The company launched its first women's pre-Spring collection on the runway with its men's collection on 22 June 2008 and has released cruise collections since Spring 2010.

Alexander McQueen launched an online store in the US in 2008. This was later expanded with an online store for the UK market in 2010. On 31 October 2011 Alexander McQueen opened its first store in Beijing with a runway show.

McQueen's suicide was announced on the afternoon of 11 February 2010. At the time of his death, the company had debts of £32 million despite posting profits from handbag sales in 2008.

Sarah Burton, who was McQueen's deputy for 14 years, became the creative director for the Alexander McQueen label after his death. The company continued to expand globally in the following years, and its product range also expanded. The number of McQueen stores worldwide had increased to 100 by the end of 2020, with revenues estimated to be €500 million in 2020.

== McQ ==
On 27 July 2006 the company launched a lower-priced diffusion line, McQ. The line, separate from the main house, carried upscale men's and women's ready-to-wear and accessories, was exclusively designed by Lee Alexander McQueen, manufactured and distributed worldwide by SINV SpA under the terms of a five-year licence agreement with Alexander McQueen. Promoted as a denim line, the focus of McQ was a more youthful market. The Spring/Summer 2011 was the final collection in collaboration with SINV SpA. Pina Ferlisi was appointed as the creative director for the line in June 2010.

Following the expiration of the contract with SINV SpA with the Spring/Summer 2011 collection, the brand announced on 11 October 2010 that it would take control of the McQ diffusion line by creating a new internal team with the creative direction of Pina Ferlisi, under the leadership of Alexander McQueen's creative director Sarah Burton. For the first campaign for the re-acquired line, photographer Niall O'Brien collaborated with McQ by driving across the American Northwest capturing images which evoked the McQ attitude.

In August 2011 the company announced it would launch its first McQ standalone boutique in London in 2012. In November 2011 it announced that McQ would be presented at London Fashion Week for the first time in February 2012, and that its four-storey Georgian townhouse boutique would stock womenswear, menswear, and accessories.

As of June 2022, the McQ diffusion line was "suspended" after the appointment of a new CEO, Gianfilippo Testa, in May 2022.

== Collaborations ==
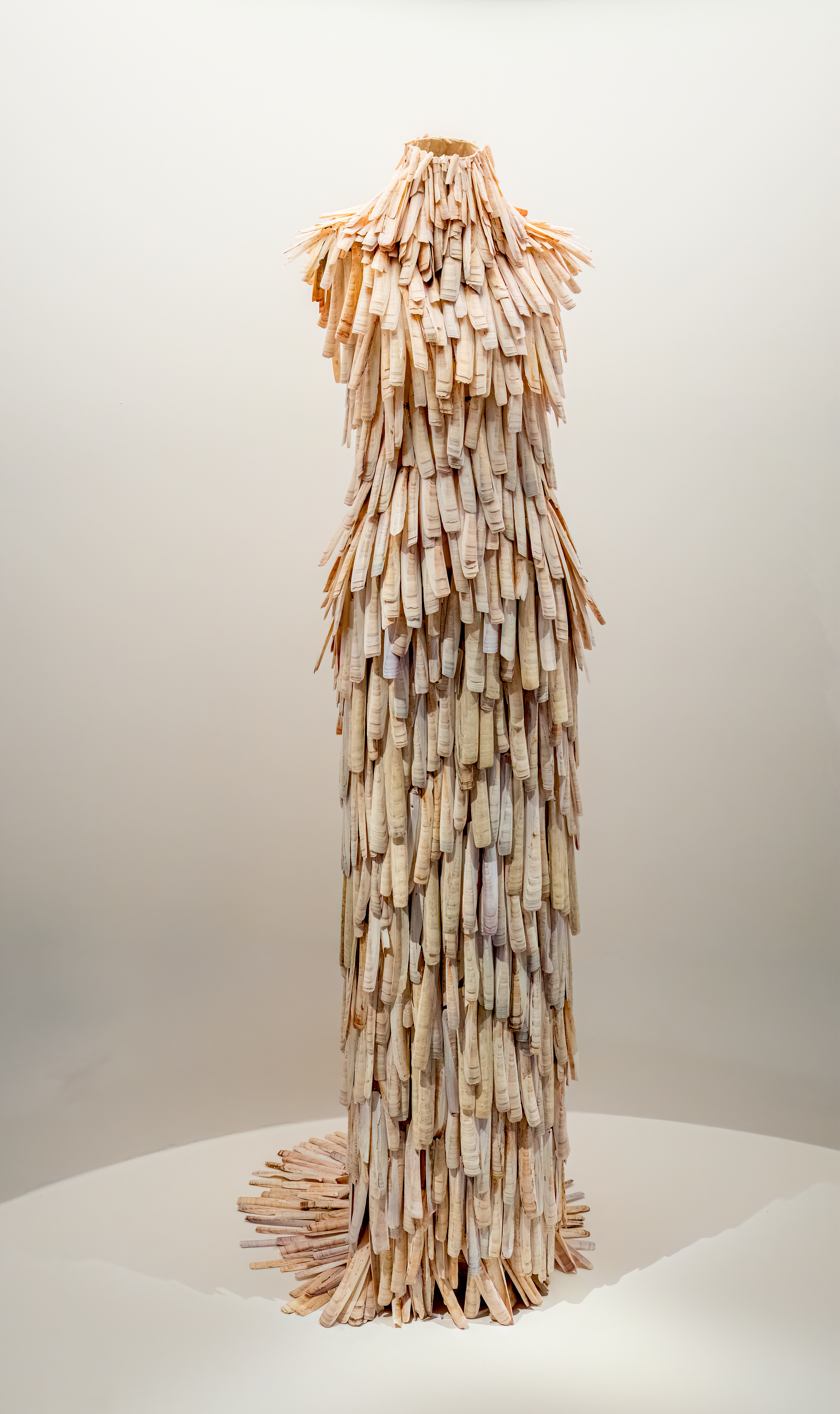
Alexander McQueen dress, 2001

Between 1996 and 2001 Alexander McQueen collaborated with the jeweller Shaun Leane on bespoke jewellery pieces for the catwalk presentations.

In January 2003 Alexander McQueen collaborated with the perfumer Jacques Cavallier to launch his first fragrance, Kingdom, which was launched on the designer's birthday 17 March. A limited-edition version of the fragrance was launched in 2004. The company launched its second fragrance, My Queen, three years later in 2006. On 10 October 2003 Alexander McQueen collaborated with Michael Clark to stage the Spring 2004 collection. On 15 October 2003 Alexander McQueen collaborated with Björk at Fashion Rocks where the Fall 2003 collection was presented at the Royal Albert Hall.

In 2004 Alexander McQueen collaborated with Safilo via a licensing deal to launch an eyewear range. The 2010 collection featured the house's trademark skull detail. The same year, the company collaborated with American Express to launch a limited-edition version of its ultra-exclusive Centurion Card. The card is available by invitation only to AMEX Platinum card members. To launch the card, McQueen hosted a retrospective of his collections from 1995 until late 2003.

In 2005 Alexander McQueen collaborated with Puma AG to produce a line of men's and women's footwear launched in Spring 2006. The Alexander McQueen x PUMA collaboration was founded on the union of tradition and technology, with juxtaposing influences. In 2008 the line's Fall 2009 collection was fully expanded to include men's and women's apparel, with a collaboration with the film director Saam Farahmand to produce a 4-minute short film Ghost as an ad campaign for the collection.

In 2007 Alexander McQueen became the first brand to participate in MAC's promotion of cosmetic releases created by fashion designers. The collection was released on 11 October and reflected the looks used on the Autumn/Winter McQueen catwalk. The inspiration for the collection was the 1963 film Cleopatra starring Elizabeth Taylor, and thus the models sported intense blue, green, and teal eyes with strong black liner extended Egyptian-style.

In 2008 Alexander McQueen collaborated with Samsonite to produce the Black Label luggage collection using a mould of a human ribcage and sternum on the front and spine on the back. Other pieces in the collection apply animal patterns like crocodile to the bags' skin using laser cutting technology. With the catwalk presentations, Alexander McQueen collaborated with Philip Treacy to produce hats for the Spring 2008 collection, and again with the Fall 2009 collection. The same year, the McQ diffusion line collaborated with the retailer Target as McQ for Target. It was the first collaboration between Target and an international designer. McQueen cited Leila Moss of The Duke Spirit as his muse for the collection. The collection was launched on 4 March 2009, with the band playing at the launch party.

During first semester of 2009, McQueen also collaborated with the dancer Sylvie Guillem, the director Robert Lepage and the choreographer Russell Maliphant to design the wardrobe for the theatre show "Eonnagata", directed by Lepage. The film "Sylvie Guillem, On The Edge" produced by the French production company A DROITE DE LA LUNE, traces the whole history of the creation of the show, from its first rehearsals in Quebec to its world premiere in 2008 at Sadler's Wells theatre in London.

On 6 October 2009 the company collaborated with SHOWstudio to stream its Spring/Summer 2010 collection Plato's Atlantis live on the company's website. The shoes from that collection were later featured on the SHOWstudio website. The same year, the company collaborated with Unkle who produced music for the McQ Autumn/Winter 2009 collection titled McQ. The collaboration was a success, and was extended a second season for the McQ Spring/Summer 2010 collection where the promotional CD was given out in a McQ press goodie bag.

In June 2010 Visionaire magazine's 58th issue, titled Spirit: A Tribute To Lee Alexander McQueen, was released as a tribute to the late founder. The issue featured images and discussions with editors who had met McQueen in 2003 to discuss the collaboration which never materialised. The issue also features contributions from Lady Gaga, Steven Klein, Nick Knight and Mario Testino Only 1,500 numbered copies were made, with pages made from seeded paper, which will sprout wildflowers once planted, signifying the ongoing legacy of McQueen.

== Controversies ==
Alexander McQueen first caused controversy with his Spring/Summer 1995 collection which featured his signature "bumster trousers". At the time, the trousers were described as indecent because they barely covered the natural downward curve of the buttocks. He followed this by entitling his Autumn/Winter 1995 collection Highland Rape, which he explained was about the "rape" of Scotland by the English, a subject that had a personal resonance because his family are of Scottish descent. The collection featured tattered dresses made of scraps of tartan and chiffon and a tampon-strewn skirt.

In 1998 Alexander McQueen photographed Aimee Mullins and sent her down the catwalk with intricately carved wooden legs – making her the first amputee to be featured on the catwalk. For the untitled Spring/Summer 1999 catwalk show, Shalom Harlow's white cotton dress was sprayed by car robots as she was spun around a platform. Animal rights activists and heavy police presence due to a reported bomb scare were present at the Autumn/Winter 2000 Eshu catwalk show, due to the extensive use of fur and leather in the collection.

McQueen was accused of misogyny following the Autumn/Winter 2009 The Horn of Plenty catwalk show where models with huge, overdrawn red and black lips were compared to a blow-up sex doll and hats made from found objects and rubbish like aluminium cans and duct tape implied models themselves were trash. Similarly, the Autumn/Winter 2010 An Bailitheor Cnámh menswear catwalk show featured men in masks and netted headgear that alluded to sadomasochism or bondage, and one of the suits was printed with human skulls and bones.

For the Spring/Summer 2010 Plato's Atlantis catwalk show, models refused to wear 12 inch high armadillo shoes due to safety fears. One of the models who refused, had fainted in the Spring/Summer 2009 Natural Dis-tinction Un-natural Selection catwalk show after being squeezed into a corset which was too tight. Lady Gaga wore a pair in her music video for "Bad Romance" and created a version in chocolate encrusted with sparkly sprinkles for her Christmas shop in 2011.

Selfridges store in London caused controversy when they unveiled a window display showing one of McQueen's designs being hanged from the gallows. The store later apologised, saying that "presenting a fashion item from the new Alexander McQueen collection hanging was never intended to be linked to the designer's untimely death or how he died."

In October 2010 Hell's Angels, an international motorcycle club, filed a lawsuit against the company for "misusing its trademark winged death heads symbol" in several items from its Autumn/Winter 2010 collection. The lawsuit was widely reported, The US$2,325 "Hell's Angels Knuckleduster Box clutch" handbag and US$560 "Hells Angels Pashmina" scarf was also named in lawsuit. The lawyer representing Hells Angels claimed "This isn't just about money, it's about membership. If you've got one of these rings on, a member might get really upset that you're an imposter." The company settled the case with the Hell's Angels after agreeing to remove all of the merchandise featuring the logo from sale on their website, stores and concessions and recalling any of the goodies which have already been sold and destroying them.

The costume designer Jany Temime was exposed for copying a dress from the Autumn/Winter 2008 collection The Girl Who Lived in the Tree, for her work on Harry Potter and the Deathly Hallows. Temime had claimed that she "wanted it to be a witch wedding dress but not a Halloween dress. The dress is white but it needed to have something fantastic to it. So there is the phoenix [motif], the bird, which is a symbol of love in a way because there is rebirth, love never dies, it is born again." The story was widely reported by the fashion media.

== Post-Lee Alexander McQueen through today ==
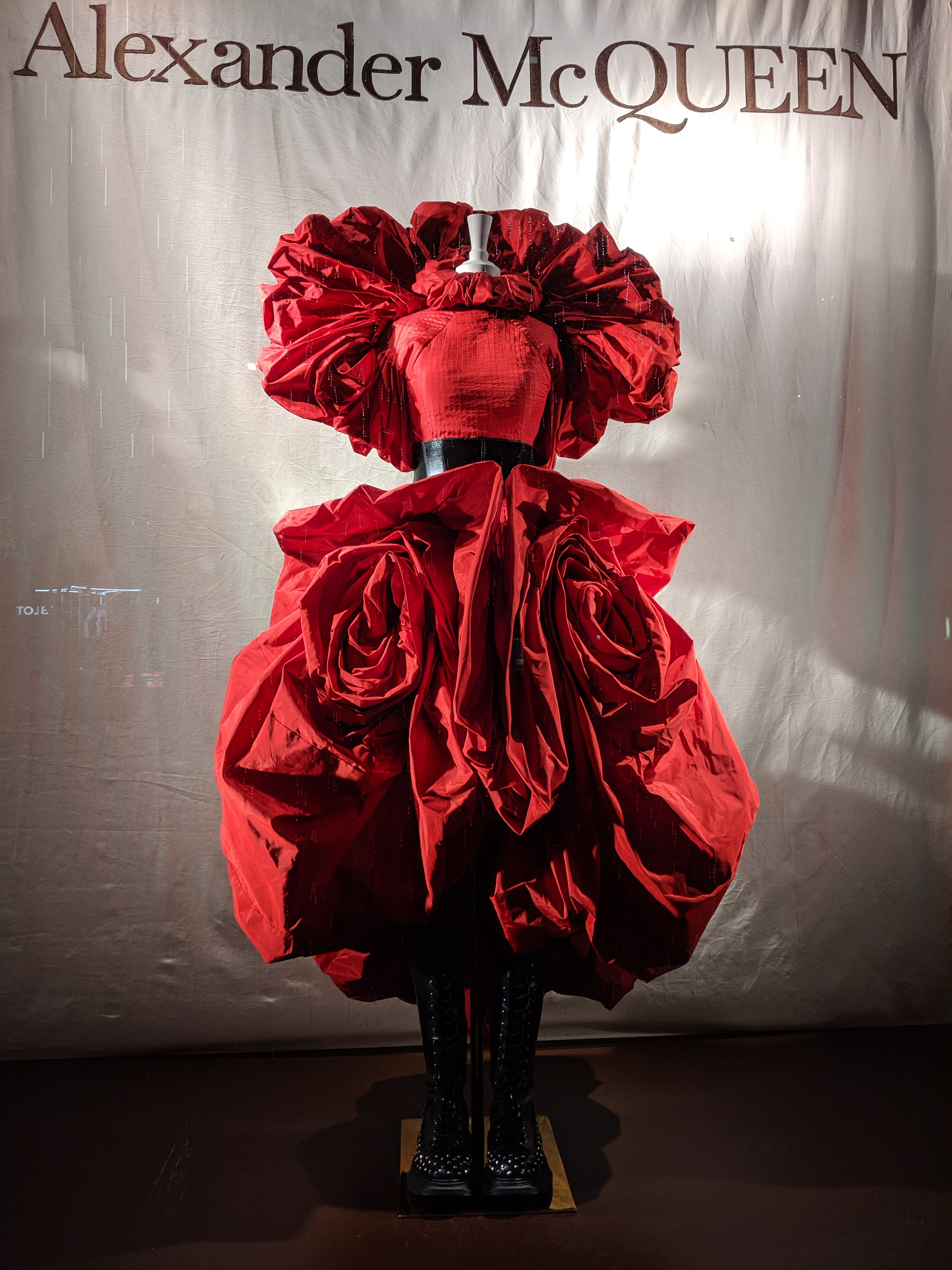
An Alexander McQueen dress designed by Sarah Burton, Autumn 2019 collection

On 18 February 2010 Robert Polet, the president and chief executive of the Gucci Group, announced that the Alexander McQueen business would carry on without its founder and creative director. He also added that a McQueen collection would be presented during Paris Fashion Week.

On 27 May 2010 Sarah Burton, McQueen's right hand design aide since 1996, was announced as the new creative director of the Alexander McQueen brand, with further plans to launch a men's underwear collection in June 2010. The underwear line featured iconic prints from the McQueen archive and the logo on the waistband, with a percentage of the launch collection of Alexander McQueen underwear to be given to various AIDS charities around the world.

Burton launched her first menswear show Pomp and Circumstance under the McQueen brand in June 2010 to generally positive reviews, which noted how low-key the event was. She launched the brand's womenswear resort collection shortly after, which was praised for lightness and having 'a woman's touch'. Burton showed her first womenswear show on 5 October 2010 in Paris, where she said her vision for the brand would be "lighter". The show was praised for being one of the strongest shows at Paris Fashion Week, "full of McQueen trademarks and ideas" and a "far more optimistic sensibility". Michael Jackson's "I'll Be There" was played at the finale of the show.

The creative director Sarah Burton designed the dress worn by Catherine Middleton during her wedding to Prince William, Duke of Cambridge, on Friday 29 April 2011.

An analysis of online chatter shows that Alexander McQueen creates the most intense feelings of brand passion amongst wedding dress designers in the NetBase Brand Passion Index.

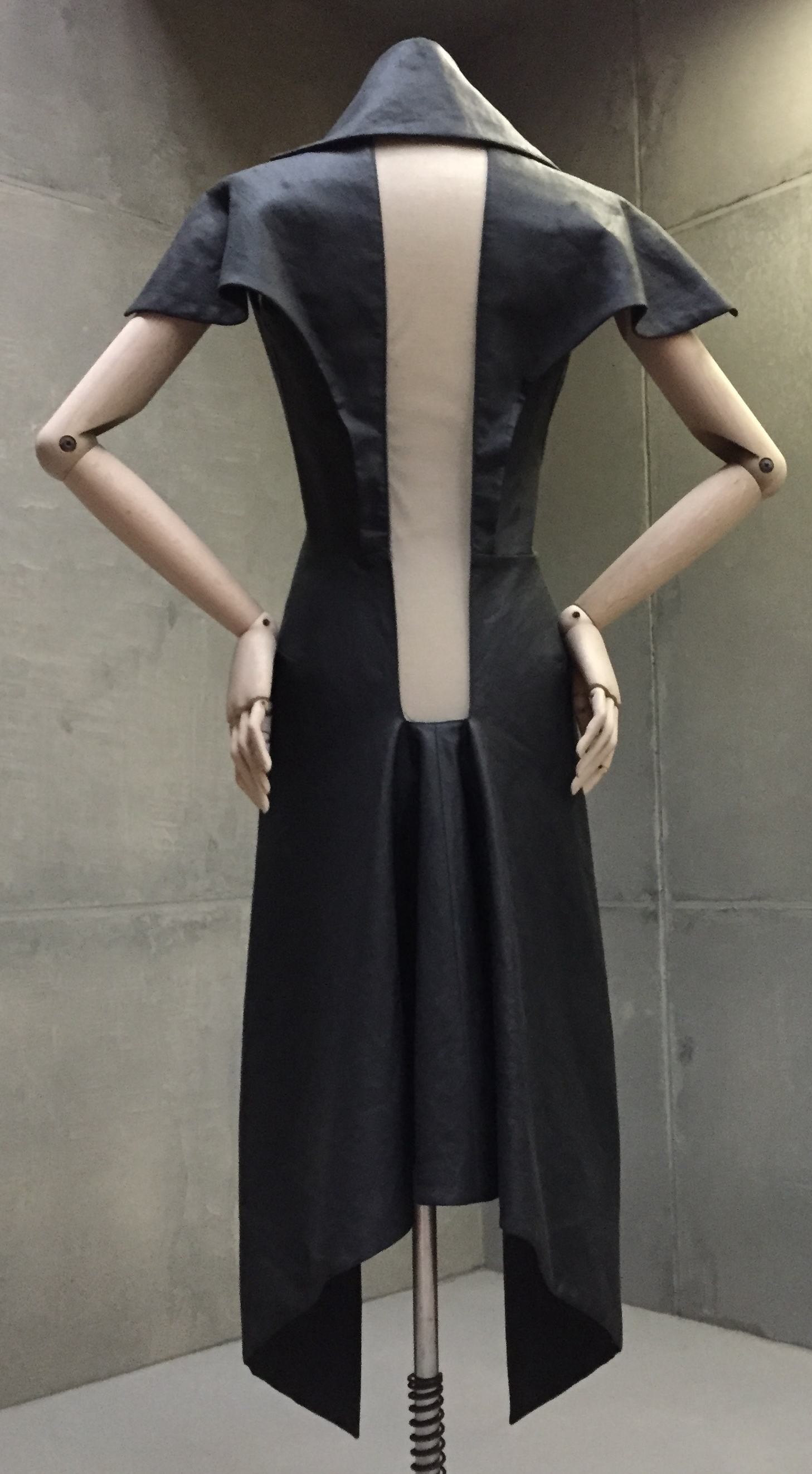
An example of McQueen's ability to structure, saw, and create visionary garnments

The Metropolitan Museum of Art in New York City hosted a posthumous exhibition of McQueen's work in 2011 titled Savage Beauty. Despite being open for only three months, it was one of the most popular exhibitions in the museum's history. The exhibition was so successful that Alexander McQueen fans and industry professionals worldwide began rallying at Change.org to "Please Make Alexander McQueen's Savage Beauty a Traveling Exhibition" to bring honour to McQueen and see his vision become a reality: to share his work with the entire world. This exhibition celebrated McQueen's vision and creativity. It comprised one hundred of its most famous designs, taken from its archive in London.

The exhibition Savage Beauty was brought to the Victoria & Albert Museum in London from 14 March 2015 to 2 August 2015.

On 28 November 2011 Sarah Burton won the Designer of the Year at the 2011 British Fashion Awards.

As of January 2014, Harley Hughes is Alexander "McQueen's head of men's wear design" during the Fall 2014 fashion show. After the show, both Sarah Burton, the creative director, and Harley Huges, took a bow to the public.

In July 2015 Catherine Middleton (now Catherine, Princess of Wales), wore an all-cream Alexander McQueen outfit for Princess Charlotte's christening.

In May 2016, at UNESCO Headquarters, Alexander McQueen brand won Prix Versailles for its rue Saint-Honoré boutique, in Paris.

In September 2023 it was announced that Burton would be stepping down from the label after a 26-year career with the brand. In October 2023 her replacement, Seàn McGirr, was announced creative director.

On 15 October 2026, McQueen announced that Seán McGirr would leave his position as creative director after three years. His departure followed a restructuring of the fashion house involving job cuts and executive changes.

== Governance ==
=== CEOs ===
- Gianfilippo Testa, 2022–2025
- Gianfranco D’Attis, 2026–present

=== Creative directors ===
- Alexander McQueen, 1992–2010
- Sarah Burton, 2010–2023
- Seán McGirr, 2023–2026

== Retail stores ==
AMQ and McQ operated by Alexander McQueen Ltd. and Kering S.A., with YOOX S.p.A. as online retailer since 2011.

- Austria: 1 boutique
- Canada: 1 boutique
- China: 21 boutiques
- France: 1 boutique
- Hong Kong: 2 boutiques
- Italy: 6 boutiques
- Japan: 4 boutiques
- Macau: 2 boutiques
- South Korea: 2 boutiques
- Turkey: 1 boutique
- United Arab Emirates: 4 boutiques
- United Kingdom: 7 boutiques
- United States: 12 boutiques

== See also ==
- List of Alexander McQueen collections
