= Sarah Burton =

English fashion designer (born 1974)

Sarah Burton OBE
- Born: Sarah Jane Heard; 1974 (age 51–52); Macclesfield, Cheshire, England
- Education: Central Saint Martins
- Occupation: Fashion designer
- Years active: 1996–present
- Labels: Alexander McQueen (2010–2023); Givenchy (2024–present)
- Spouse: David Burton
- Children: 3

Sarah Jane Burton OBE (née Heard; born 1974) is an English fashion designer. She worked at the Alexander McQueen fashion house from 1997 through 2023, spending her last 13 years at the company as its creative director. She is currently the creative director of Givenchy.

Burton designed the wedding dress of Catherine Middleton for her wedding to Prince William in 2011. In 2012, she was named in Time 100, an annual list of the 100 most influential people in the world according to Time.

== Early life ==
Burton was born in Macclesfield, Cheshire, one of five children of Anthony and Diana Heard. She attended Withington Girls' School in Manchester. After completing an art foundation course at Manchester Polytechnic, and opting to pursue fashion over studies in fine art, she studied Print Fashion at the Central Saint Martins College of Art and Design in London. During her third year she was interviewed for a year's placement at Alexander McQueen at the suggestion of her tutor Simon Ungless, a friend of McQueen's. She joined the company for a year as an intern, when the company was based in a tiny studio in Hoxton Square.

== Fashion career ==
=== Alexander McQueen (1997–2023) ===
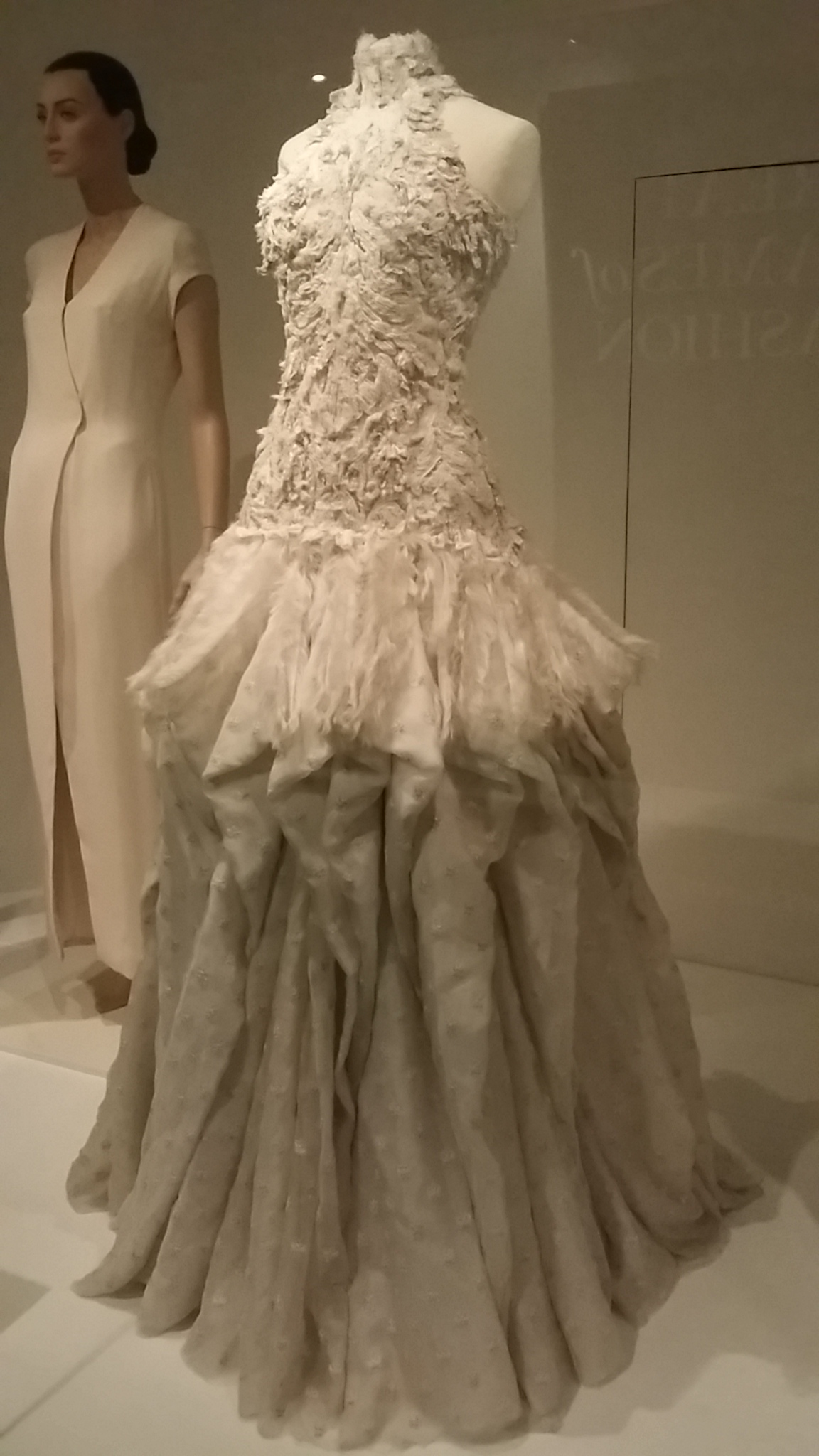
Ballgown by Sarah Burton for Alexander McQueen. Chosen as the Dress of the Year for 2011

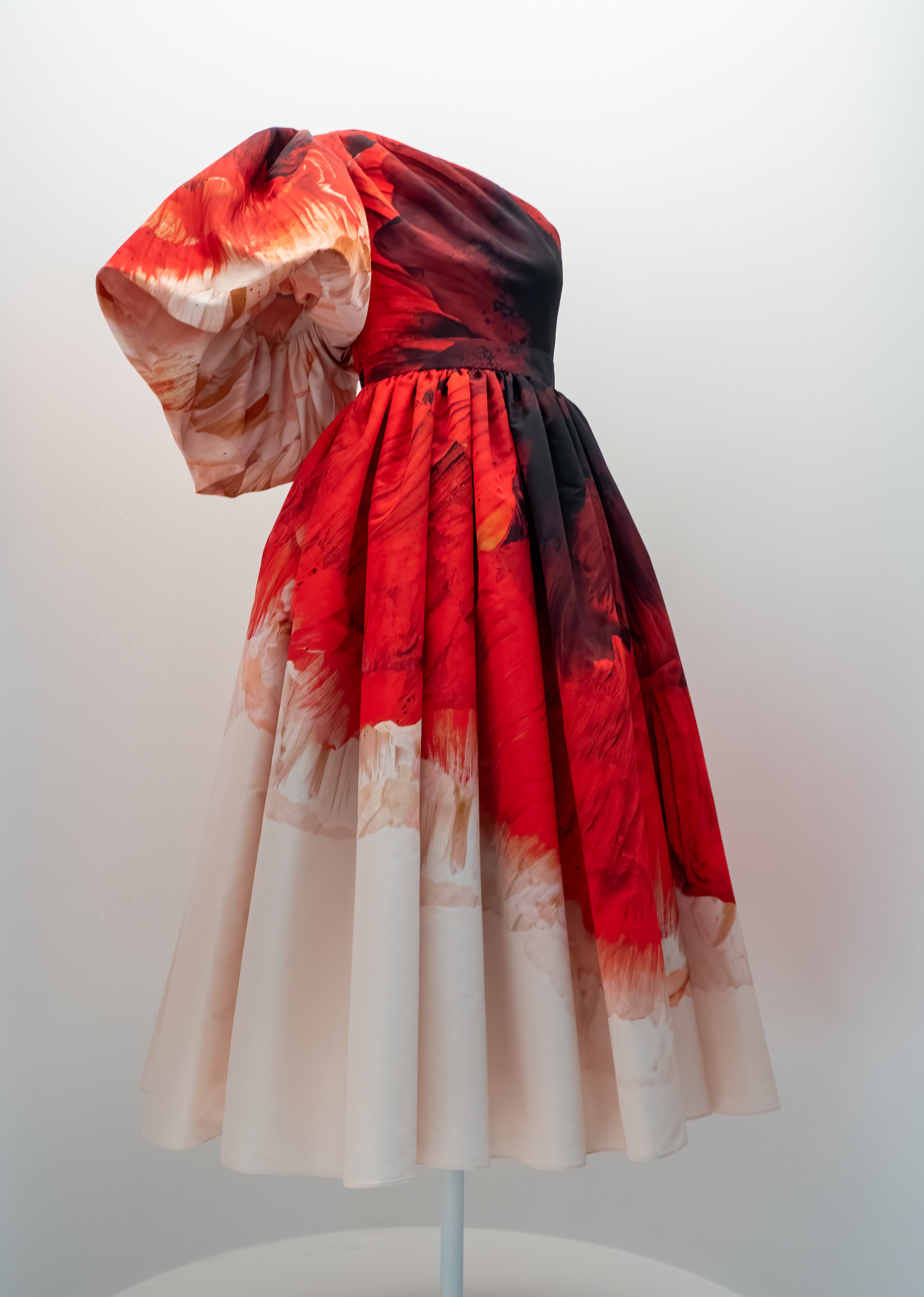
Dress designed for Alexander McQueen's autumn/winter 2021-22 collection, featured in the Metropolitan Museum of Art's Sleeping Beauties: Reawakening Fashion exhibition

Upon her graduation in 1997, Burton joined Alexander McQueen full-time. Burton was appointed Head of Womenswear in 2000, during which time she created dresses for Cate Blanchett, Lady Gaga and Gwyneth Paltrow. Following McQueen's death in February 2010, and after company owner Gucci confirmed that the brand would continue, Burton was named as the new Creative Director of Alexander McQueen in May 2010. In October 2010, Burton presented her first show in Paris.

On 29 April 2011, it was revealed that Burton had designed the wedding dress of Catherine Middleton for her marriage that day to Prince William, Duke of Cambridge. It is believed that Burton's work came to the attention of Middleton in 2005 when she attended the wedding of Tom Parker Bowles, the son of the Duchess of Cornwall, for whom McQueen had designed the wedding dress for his bride, fashion journalist Sara Buys. Burton said creating the royal wedding dress had been the "experience of a lifetime".

Burton also designed maid of honour Pippa Middleton's dress, and the dress that Catherine Middleton wore to the wedding's evening festivities.

In 2011, Burton was named the British Fashion Council's Designer of the Year.

In September 2023, Burton announced she would be departing Alexander McQueen. She had worked at the brand for 26 years.

=== Givenchy (2024–present) ===
It was announced in September 2024 that Burton would become creative director for French fashion house Givenchy. Actor Timothée Chalamet debuted the first ever menswear look by Burton for Givenchy at the 97th Academy Awards.

== Personal life ==
As of 2011, Burton lived in St John's Wood with her husband David Burton, a fashion photographer.

== Honours ==
On 28 November 2011, Burton won the Designer of the Year at the 2011 British Fashion Awards.

In July 2012, Burton received an honorary degree from Manchester Metropolitan University where she was a former student, becoming an honorary Doctor of Arts.

Burton was appointed Officer of the Order of the British Empire (OBE) in the 2012 Birthday Honours for services to the British fashion industry.

In June 2019, Burton was awarded the Valentino Garavani and Giancarlo Giammetti International Award by the Council of Fashion Designers of America. In November 2019, the British Fashion Council bestowed Burton with the Trailblazer Award.

In 2023, Burton was given the 'Special Recognition Award' at the Fashion Awards.
