= Ines Di Santo =

Italian-Argentine eveningwear and bridal designer

Ines Di Santo (Hungarian: Szántó Inez; born c. 1952) is an Italian-Argentine designer of bridal and eveningwear couture.

== Personal life ==
Di Santo was born in Italy and immigrated to Buenos Aires, Argentina, at the age of 4. She studied fine art and design in Argentina and Italy. In 1975, at 23 years old, Di Santo immigrated to Canada. She is married to Frank Augello in Toronto, Canada.

== Career ==
In 1984, Di Santo started her design house as a couture designer with her namesake label in Toronto, Canada. Di Santo's daughter, Veronica Di Santo, joined the company in 1998. In 2018, Di Santo collaborated with a New York-based jeweler and launched the Ines x Ciner jewelry collection. In 2021, Di Santo launched two new categories. The same year, Di Santo partnered with Paper Source to create wedding invitations inspired by gowns in her collections.

== Appearances ==
Di Santo's bridal design collections have been featured in Vogue. Her bridal collections were also featured on Martha Stewart Weddings, The Knot, and Inside Weddings. Jenny McCarthy, Courtney Lopez, Hazel Renee, and Tahira "Tee Tee" Francis of Growing Up Hip Hop chose Di Santo for their wedding day. Britt Robertson also chose plunging mini dress for her second wedding look designed by Di Santo. The American television personality, Carrie Ann Inaba, wore a white Di Santo gown on Dancing With the Stars Premiere Night. She appeared in the Netflix Series Ginny & Georgia.

Di Santo's latest collection was featured in the spring 2024 collections during New York Bridal Fashion Week. Her popular design during the collection includes the Motif dress, the Rayna gown, the Monet gown, the Symphony gown, and the Pizzicato gown.

Her Voluminous Ball Gowns were featured in six top trends from luxury bridal fashion week fall 2023, and in 2024, her design was selected in the Spring 2024 bridal trend: The Special One.
