= Wedding dress of Grace Kelly =

Dress worn by Grace Kelly at her wedding to Prince Rainier III of Monaco in 1956

- Artist: Helen Rose
- Year: 1956

The wedding dress of the American actress Grace Kelly, worn during her wedding to Prince Rainier III of Monaco on 19 April 1956, is cited as one of the most elegant and best-remembered bridal gowns of all time, and one of the most famous since the mid 20th century. One author describes the dress as a symbol of "the marital fervor" and a major influence on women who strove to "emulate Kelly's peau de soie and lace masterpiece". It was designed by Helen Rose of MGM. The dress consisted of a bodice with an attached under-bodice and skirt support. There were two petticoats, one being an attached foundation. The wedding attire included a headdress, veil, shoes and the lace- and pearl-encrusted prayer book which she carried down the aisle. To celebrate the 50th anniversary of the wedding, the Philadelphia Museum of Art (which now owns the dress) displayed it at the museum between 1 April and 21 May 2006 and reported it to have been arguably its most popular exhibit.

== Designs ==
Kelly's marriage involved two separate functions, the first, a civil marriage and the second, a religious marriage, held on successive days. Kelly was assisted on her wedding day by Helen Rose, the wedding dress designer and MGM Studios' costume designer, as well as Virginia Darcy, Kelly's MGM hairstylist. Because of the close friendship between the two women, Edith Head assumed that she would be asked to design the wedding dress. Instead, Helen Rose, a costume designer in the wardrobe department of Metro-Goldwyn-Mayer (MGM), was selected. The dress was a wedding gift to Kelly from the MGM studio executives.

=== Civil ceremony ===
For the civil ceremony, which was held at the baroque throne room of the palace on 18 April 1956, the dress worn by Kelly was made of taffeta, pale pink in color, covered by cream-colored Alençon lace, designed as a "fitted bodice with high rounded collar and a flared skirt". She wore kid gloves and the Juliet cap. The dress for the legal civil ceremony was designed by Helen Rose, who also designed the gown for the main religious ceremony. The marriage was legally solemnized, according to the civil code of Monaco, in the presence of 80 guests, which included representatives from 24 nations, and it was performed by Marcel Portanier, Monaco's Minister of Justice.

=== Religious ceremony ===
The formal religious wedding ceremony of Kelly and Prince Rainier was held on 19 April 1956 at the Cathedral of Our Lady Immaculate. The Pontifical High Mass was conducted by Gilles Barthe, the bishop of Monaco. The bride wore an elegant wedding dress. It was a high-necked, long-sleeved gown with a fitted torso and billowing skirt. Grace Kelly worked closely with Helen Rose to come up with the design for the dress, and the two women looked to costumes in the MGM archives for inspiration. A wedding dress from the MGM film Invitation is particularly similar to Grace's dress. The dress materials included "twenty-five yards of silk taffeta, one hundred yards of silk net, peau de soie, tulle and 125-year-old Brussels rose point lace."

The Juliet cap that she wore was bejeweled with seed pearls and orange blossoms. The veil, made of tulle, measured 90 yards. Her other wedding adornments included a missal and a bouquet of lilies of the valley. The material cost and manufacturing cost of the dress was indicated as US$ 7266.68, excluding the fee of the designer. In 2005, the Philadelphia Museum of Art discovered that her wedding shoes held a lucky penny, hidden in the right shoe.

== Reception and influence ==
The "serenely regal" dress was described by the media when the details were disclosed two days before the wedding. While columnist Ilka Chase observed that it was "a charming dress but not a superb one", the general consensus was that the gown was magnificent. Continuing the idea of a rivalry between European and American clothing in Monaco, The New York Times called it "the loveliest example of the American product". In a simile given by another reporter, the bridal dress train of 3 feet (0.91 m) was described as "flowing like a river of whipped cream among the plush red floor."

The wedding announcements, which received wide press coverage, also brought in controversial versions of the claims made by many commercial establishments out to exploit her name such as the Max Factor announcement that it would give the cosmetics to match her wedding dress, and hosiery maker Willy's de Mond announcing that it would give her the pearl-trimmed stockings. All of these claims were denied by Grace.

On 1 April 2006, The Philadelphia Museum of Art presented an exhibition titled Fit for a Princess: Grace Kelly's Wedding Dress, that ran until 21 May 2006. The exhibition was in honor of the 50th anniversary of the wedding.

Some 50 years on, Kelly's 1956 wedding gown is still influential; it has come in for praise in recent times because the wedding dress that Catherine Middleton wore on 29 April 2011 when she married Prince William was said to have been inspired by it. V-shaped necklines and long, white laced sleeves are particularly mentioned. Israeli singer Maya Bouskilla wore a similar copy of the dress for her June 2011 wedding. It was the inspiration for the wedding dress of Once Upon a Time's Emma Swan when she married Captain Hook in the musical episode, "The Song in Your Heart". It was also the inspiration for Australian model Miranda Kerr's wedding dress worn to her 2017 marriage with American businessman Evan Spiegel. In 2021, American socialite Paris Hilton wore an Oscar de la Renta wedding dress inspired by the gown itself on her marriage to Carter Reum.

Brenda Janowitz's novel The Grace Kelly Dress (2020) explores the influence of the dress over 60 years.

== See also ==
- List of individual dresses
- Grace Kelly's Wedding Dress in the Philadelphia Museum of Art
- Kelly bag, a handbag popularized by and named after Grace Kelly
