= Elizabeth Holmes (writer) =

American writer and journalist (born 1980)

- Born: 1980 (age 45–46)
- Education: Columbia University
- Occupations: writer, political reporter
- Spouse: Matthew Stuart
- Children: 3

Elizabeth Holmes (born 1980) is an American writer and journalist based in Los Angeles, California. Known for her coverage of British royal style and fashion messaging, her bestselling debut book, HRH: So Many Thoughts on Royal Style, was published in November 2020. Her work has also appeared in The New York Times, Town & Country, Real Simple, and InStyle.

== Early life and education ==
Holmes graduated from St. Olaf College in Northfield, Minnesota and received a master’s in journalism from the Graduate School of Journalism at Columbia University.

== Journalism ==
In 2006, Holmes started at The Wall Street Journal as a reporting assistant and then became a political reporter following John McCain, Sarah Palin, and Mitt Romney throughout the 2008 presidential campaign. After the election, Holmes joined The Wall Street Journal's corporate team, reporting on major retailers and apparel makers. Her final role at The Wall Street Journal was as a senior style reporter and columnist focusing on the business of fashion and beauty. While at The Wall Street Journal, Holmes hosted a how-to web video series, #THIS, with Elizabeth Holmes.

In 2017, Holmes transitioned to a freelance career, contributing regularly to The New York Times, Town & Country, Real Simple, and InStyle.

== "So Many Thoughts" ==
Holmes started the Instagram series "So Many Thoughts", a sartorial commentary series on the British royal family on Instagram Stories in 2017. The series annotates pictures of the Catherine, Duchess of Cambridge and Meghan, Duchess of Sussex, with a focus on decoding the messages behind royal fashion choices. In the podcast Second Life by the website Who What Wear, Holmes explains,

"Sometimes people ask, 'Why do you care so much about what they're wearing?' I care because they care, because they're putting a lot of thought into it because they recognize, good or bad, that this attention is there. And they're going to harness it to further their purpose."

The series won a Webby Award in 2019.

Holmes has also written feature articles covering the portrayal of the British aristocracy in TV and film, including The Crown and Downton Abbey.

In November 2020, Holmes published her first book, HRH: So Many Thoughts on Royal Style, which expands on her Instagram series. The book covers the style, branding, and positioning of Queen Elizabeth II, Diana, Princess of Wales, Catherine, Duchess of Cambridge, and Meghan, Duchess of Sussex. HRH: So Many Thoughts on Royal Style made the New York Times Bestseller on the list for Nonfiction.

In an interview with Parade magazine, Holmes explains that unraveling the meaning behind royal style choices shows respect to their efforts:

“They need to impress and wow and draw attention to what they’re doing because it’s a real opportunity. And they’re looking at it as part of their duties. It contributes to the overall mission of serving the crown and the country, and when you look at fashion through that lens, it’s a really powerful thing.”

== Personal life ==
Holmes lives in Los Angeles, California with her husband Matthew Stuart and three children.
