= Apricot dress of Jacqueline Kennedy =

Dress worn during Jacqueline Kennedy's tour of India

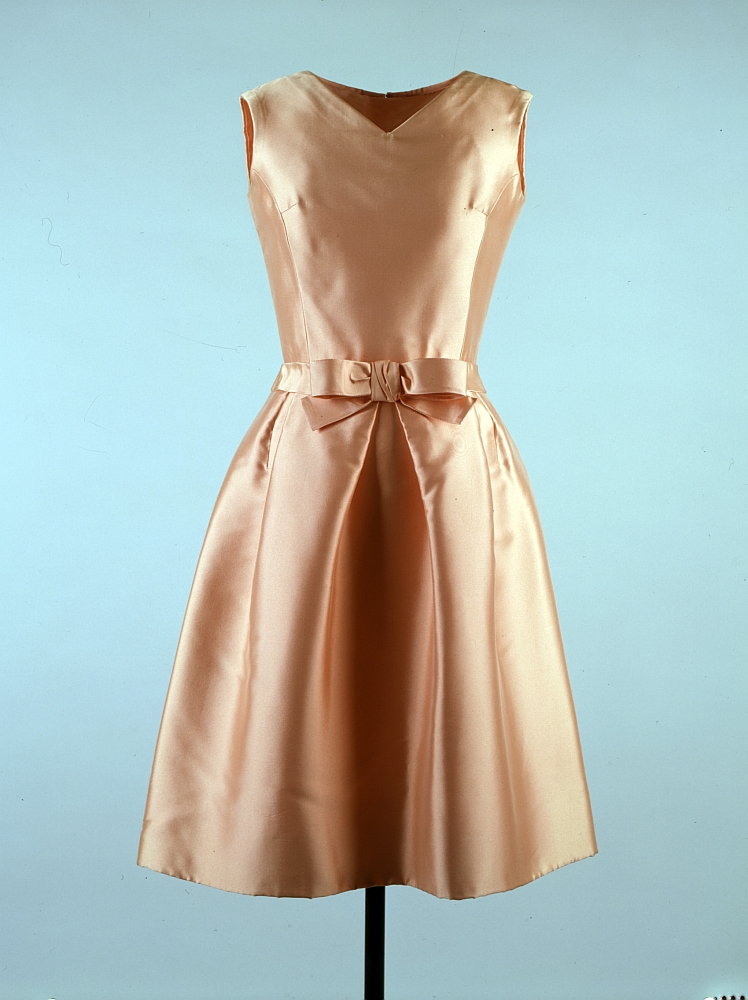
- Apricot dress worn by Jacqueline Kennedy for a daytime boat ride on Lake Pichola, India
- Designer: Oleg Cassini
- Year: 1962
- Type: Fit and flare
- Material: Zibeline

The apricot dress of US First Lady Jacqueline Kennedy, accompanied by a matching coat, was designed by Oleg Cassini, in silk zibeline. It was first featured on a daytime boat ride on 17 March 1962 at Lake Pichola, Udaipur, during Kennedy's 1962 goodwill tour of India.

Shortly after the trip, a replica of the apricot dress appeared in the catalogue of Sears, Roebuck and Co., and on a Barbie doll. It later featured in Hamish Bowles's exhibition that covered Kennedy's White House years.

== Design ==
Jacqueline Kennedy was a young first lady of the United States in the early 1960s, who was popular and set trends in fashion. She recruited Oleg Cassini to be her official fashion designer. Among other outfits, he designed a sleeveless apricot dress in silk zibeline, accompanied by a matching coat, for Kennedy. The fabric was picked for its robustness in hot weather. A bow was created at the waist. The neck was cut in a slight V shape.

== Goodwill tour 1962 ==
Kennedy's apricot dress first featured on a daytime boat ride on 17 March 1962 at Lake Pichola during her goodwill tour of India. It was noted to shine, and kept its shape, despite India's heat. Her accessories included her signature white gloves and pearl necklace. According to Cassini, "she and I had discussed Moghul miniatures – marvelous pinks, apricot, green, and importantly, white. These colors would make an impact, and they were in keeping with the climate and the wonderful vivid beauty of the country." Its color was bright enough to be noticed from a distance. In Cassini's words: "there wasn't a sense of how carefully she thought about using color as a statement. I wanted to capture that Dorothy-ending-up-in-Oz feeling. She was absolutely thinking about being a pin dot of color wherever she went." The paleness of the apricot was reported by one French artist to have contrasted well against the pink reflections of Udaipur's palaces in the lake.

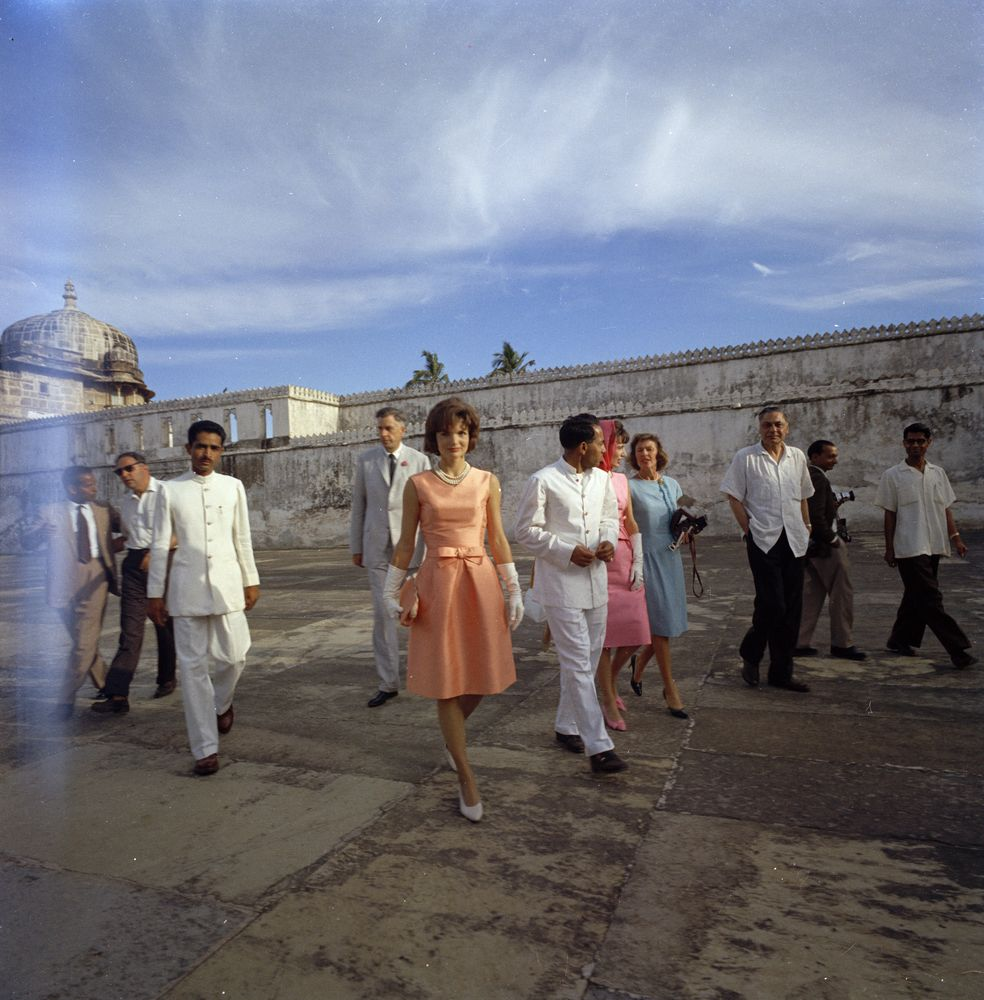
Jacqueline Kennedy at Jag Mandir on Lake Pichola, Udaipur, India

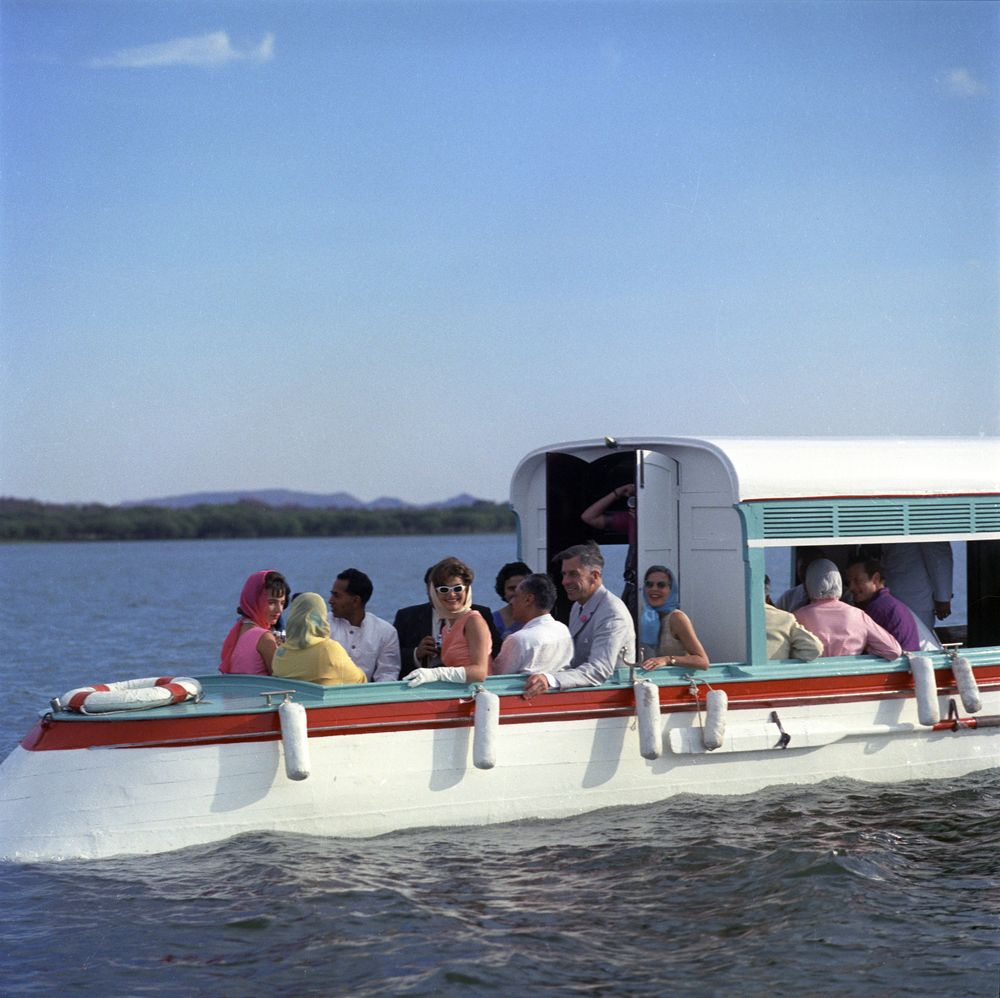
Kennedy takes a boat ride on Lake Pichola in Udaipur, India

== Later years ==
Shortly after her India tour, a replica of the apricot dress appeared in the catalogue of Sears, Roebuck and Co. The dress also featured on Mattel's doll Barbie in 1962. According to fashion historian Karan Feder, it is not clear whether Mattel influenced Sears or vice versa. (Note: Feder incorrectly notes the date of the Goodwill Tour as in 1961, not 1962.)

Hamish Bowles, in his exhibition titled "Jacqueline Kennedy: The White House Years", described the dress and coat as having "brilliantly served Mrs. Kennedy's needs: The fabric was rigid enough to keep its composure in the heat of India, and its dazzling color and sheen were calculated to ensure that she would be instantly identifiable to the crowds on the distant shore".

== See also ==
- List of individual dresses
