= Evening gown =

Woman's dress usually worn to a semi-formal or formal affair

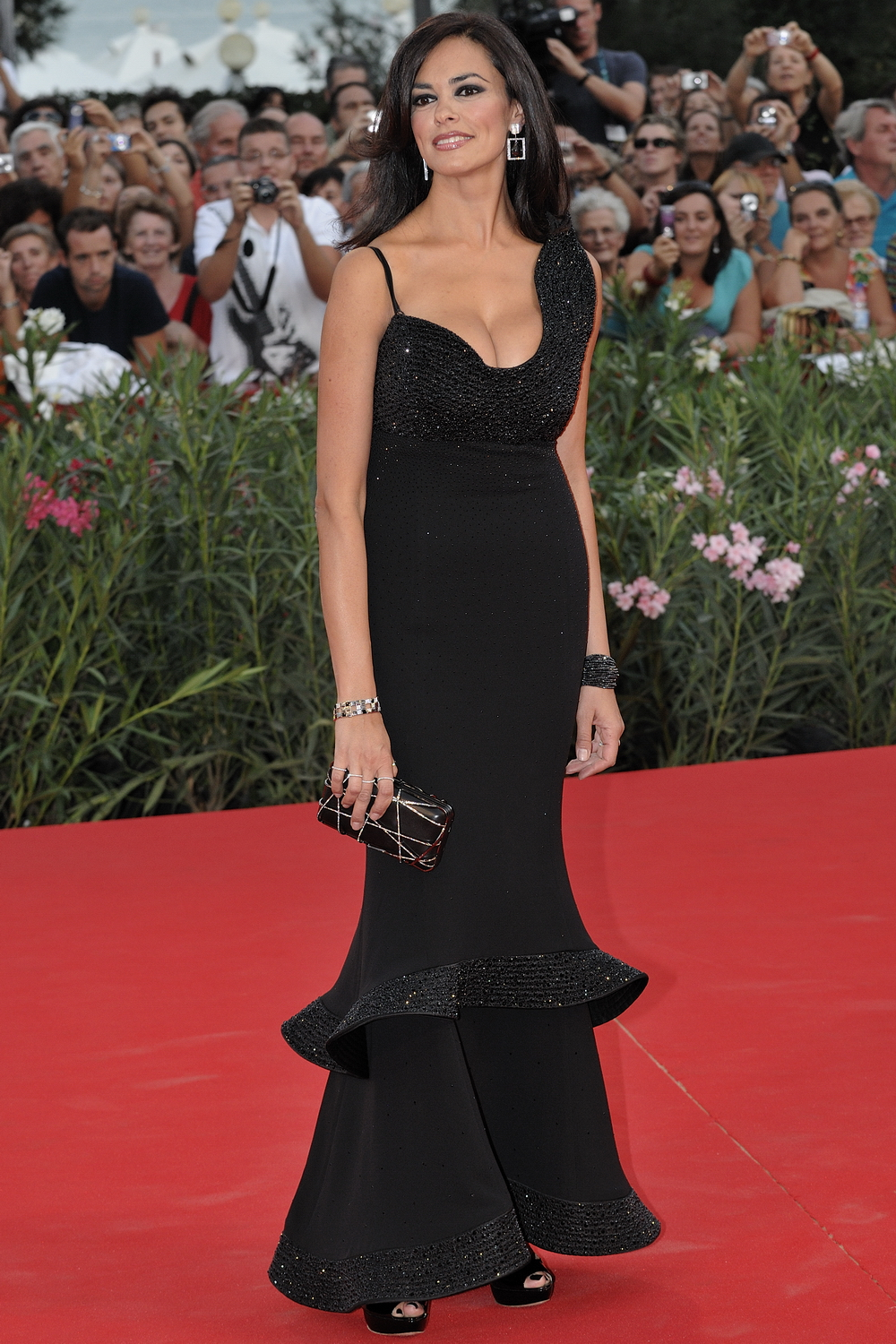
Maria Grazia Cucinotta wearing a black evening gown at the Venice Film Festival

An evening gown, evening dress or gown is a long dress usually worn at formal occasions. The drop ranges from ballerina (mid-calf to just above the ankles), tea (above the ankles), to full-length. Such gowns are typically worn with evening gloves. Evening gowns are usually made of luxurious fabrics such as chiffon, velvet, satin, or organza. Silk is a popular fibre for many evening gowns. Although the terms are used interchangeably, ball gowns and evening gowns differ in that a ball gown will always have a full skirt and a fitted bodice, while an evening gown can be any silhouette—sheath, mermaid, fit and flare, A-line, or trumpet-shaped—and may have straps, halters or even sleeves.

== History ==
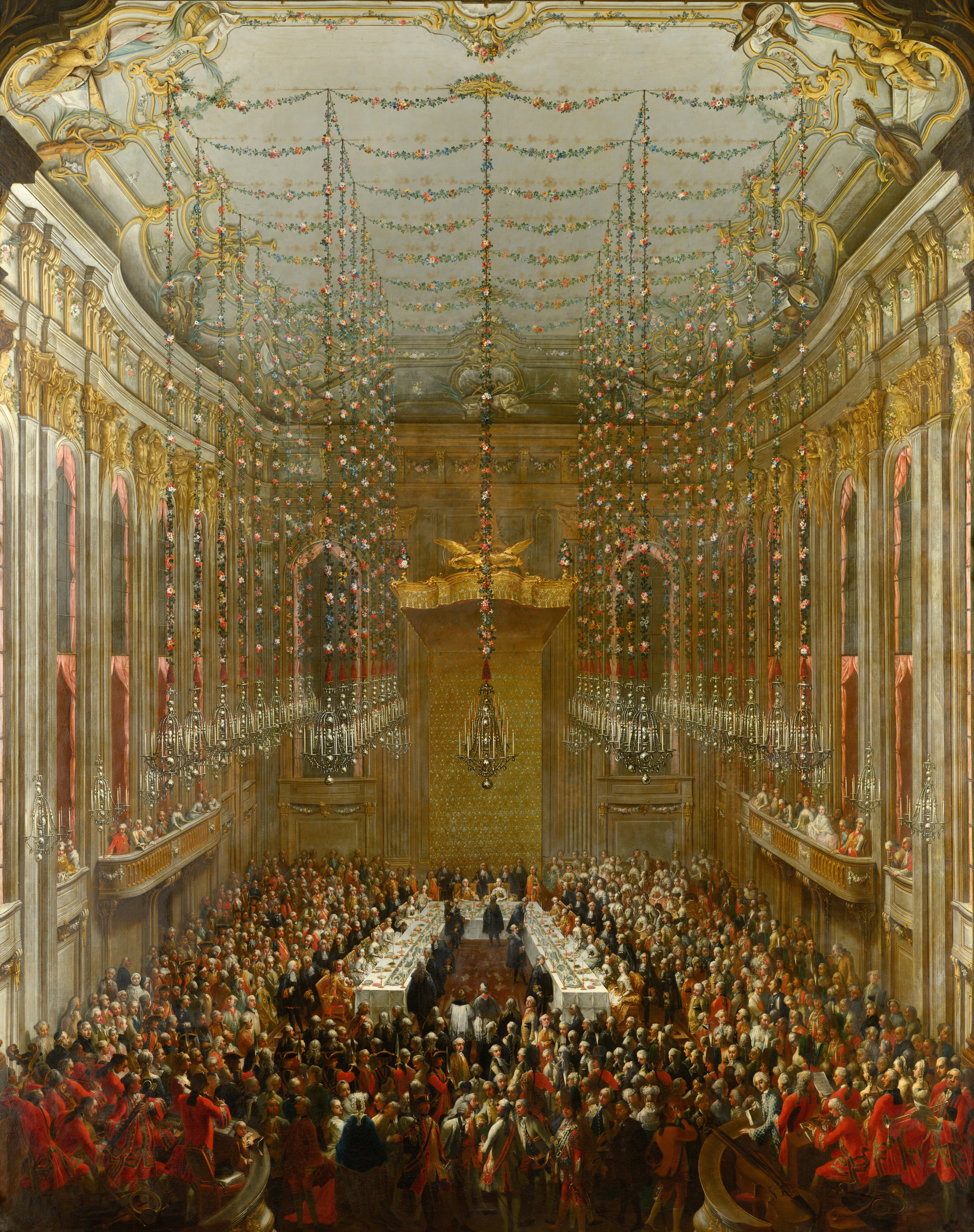
Wedding supper of Princess Isabella of Parma and future Holy Roman Emperor Joseph II, 1760; female attendees are shown wearing ornate court gowns decorated with lace and jewels

=== Early modern period ===
Evening wear for women, sometimes also known as court dress based on its creation at royal courts, has its origins in the 15th century with the rise of the Burgundian court and its fashionable and fashion-conscious ruler Philip the Good. Wool, in various weaves, was the most dominant fabric for dresses, and the ladies of the court often simply added a train to their kirtle for formal occasions. Rich fabrics and fibres were usually the domain of the nobility, and clothing was used as an identifier of social rank and status. The dawn of the Renaissance slowly changed the rigid social rank system, and allowed wealthy Patricians and merchants to visibly display their success. The art of weaving silk was firmly established in the Mediterranean around 1400, and as a result, silk weaves became fashionable for those who could afford them. Dresses for court balls and similar festivities were often made of intricately woven silk and trimmed with expensive furs to highlight the wearer's social status.

The vibrant court life of the 16th and 17th centuries, with its focus on art, literature, and music created a fertile environment for feminine formal clothing. Elaborate dinners, dances, and theatre productions allowed fashionable ladies to showcase their finery. The Italian Renaissance courts were the pinnacle of style and elegance in Europe. With the advent of the Baroque era, the focus began to shift to France and the court of Louis XIV. 17th century court dresses featured draped skirts with long trains, tight bodices, low necklines trimmed with lace, and embroidered, lace- and-ribbon-trimmed, full sleeves. Rich silk weaves, such as satin, taffeta, and velvet created luxurious gowns. In the 18th century, formal dress started as the mantua, but later developed into the elaborate sack-back gown. The farthingale, popular during the 16th/17th centuries, evolved into the pannier to give dresses and skirts extra volume and the desired court silhouette.

During this entire period, a ball or evening dress was synonymous with court dress, as balls took place at court or in the palaces and salons of the nobility who copied the latest fashions at the courts. Starting with the late 18th century, the term "evening or ball gown" emerged, as balls and formal dances were no longer the sole domain of royals and aristocrats. This was a result of the French Revolution, which firmly cemented the place of upper-middle and upper class citizens in high society. A common silhouette for evening wear, just as for day wear, was the high-waisted Empire or Regency dress. Evening versions featured lower necklines, short sleeves and elaborate fabrics and embroidery.

=== 19th and 20th century ===
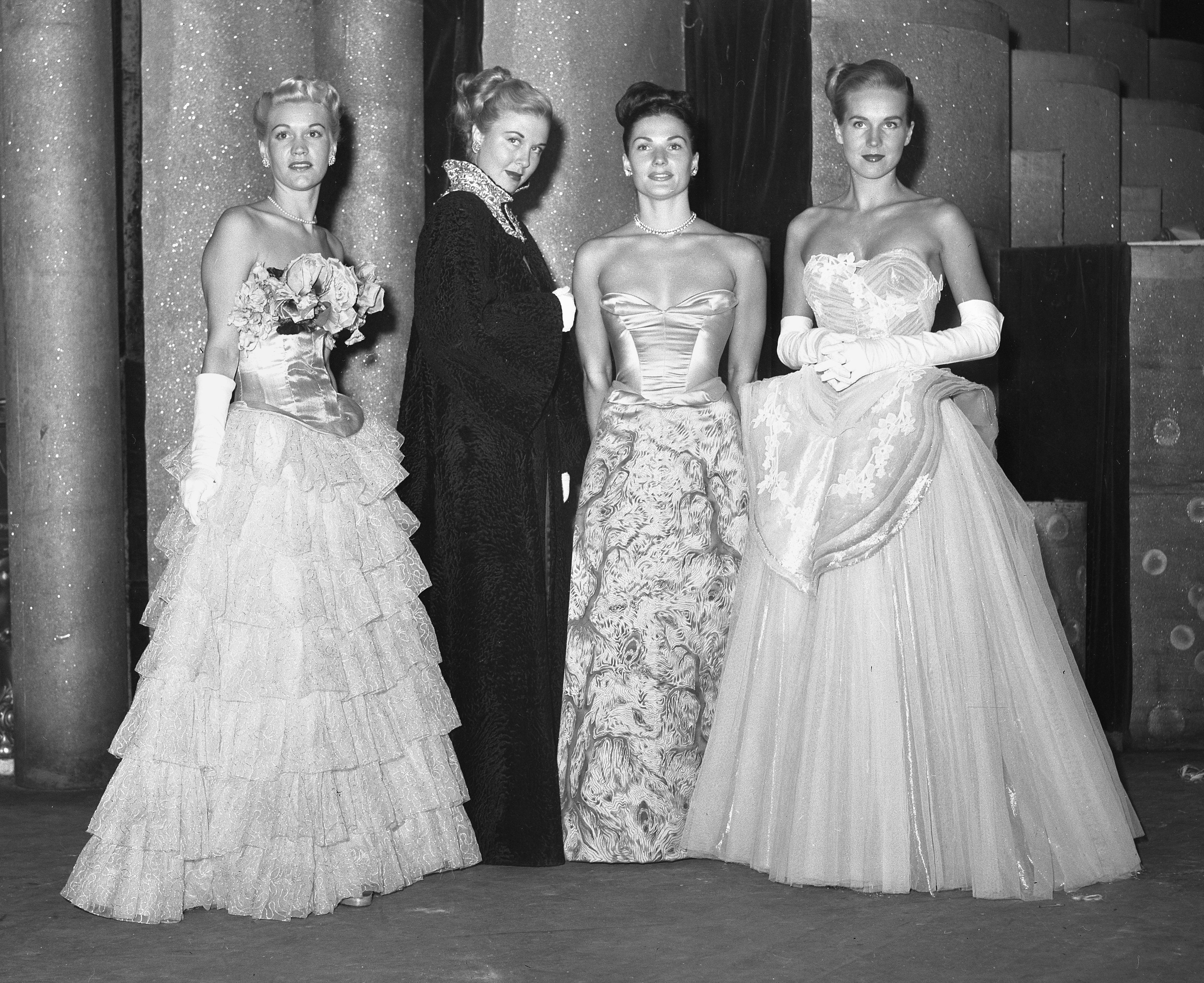
Evening gowns shown at a Los Angeles fashion show, 1947

Evening styles changed dramatically during the 19th century, and evolved from the relatively simple classically inspired lines of the early decades to progressively fuller skirts and, at times, sleeves (1830s and 1840s). The styles ranged from having huge sleeves in the 1830s, to off-the-shoulder and with wide flounces in the 1840s, to very low-necked in the 1850s, to having low necklines and short sleeves in the 1860s, to long and lean with a bustle and very short sleeves in the 1870s, to sleeveless, low-necked, and worn with opera gloves in the 1880s, to having a squared decolletage, a wasp-waist cut, and skirts with long trains in the 1890s. The 19th century distinguished between relatively high-necked dinner gowns for formal dinners and soirees, evening gowns for dances and theatre events, and ball gowns for the most formal affairs including balls and the opera.

During the Edwardian era, or Belle Epoque, the s-shaped figure was fashionable, which included a very narrow waist. Immediately preceding and during World War I, lines became looser and more fluid as a precursor to the boyish silhouettes of the 1920s. Later, in the 1920s, the hemlines of evening gowns rose and cuts were very simple to match the new life style of the Flapper era. The 1930s introduced bias cuts and artificial fibres. Along with the Empire cut, over the years the sheath, mermaid, A-line, and trumpet shapes became popular. Also, the dropped waist and princess styles were popular, depending on the era. Grace Kelly is noted for wearing understated evening gowns.

=== Contemporary fashion ===
Today, the evening gown comes in different silhouettes and even lengths, but the full-skirted ball gown remains the pinnacle of formality. Evening gowns are worn at various semi-formal black-tie (and sometimes white tie) functions, including formal dinners, opera and theater premieres, formal dances, evening wedding receptions, and charity balls.

=== Gallery ===
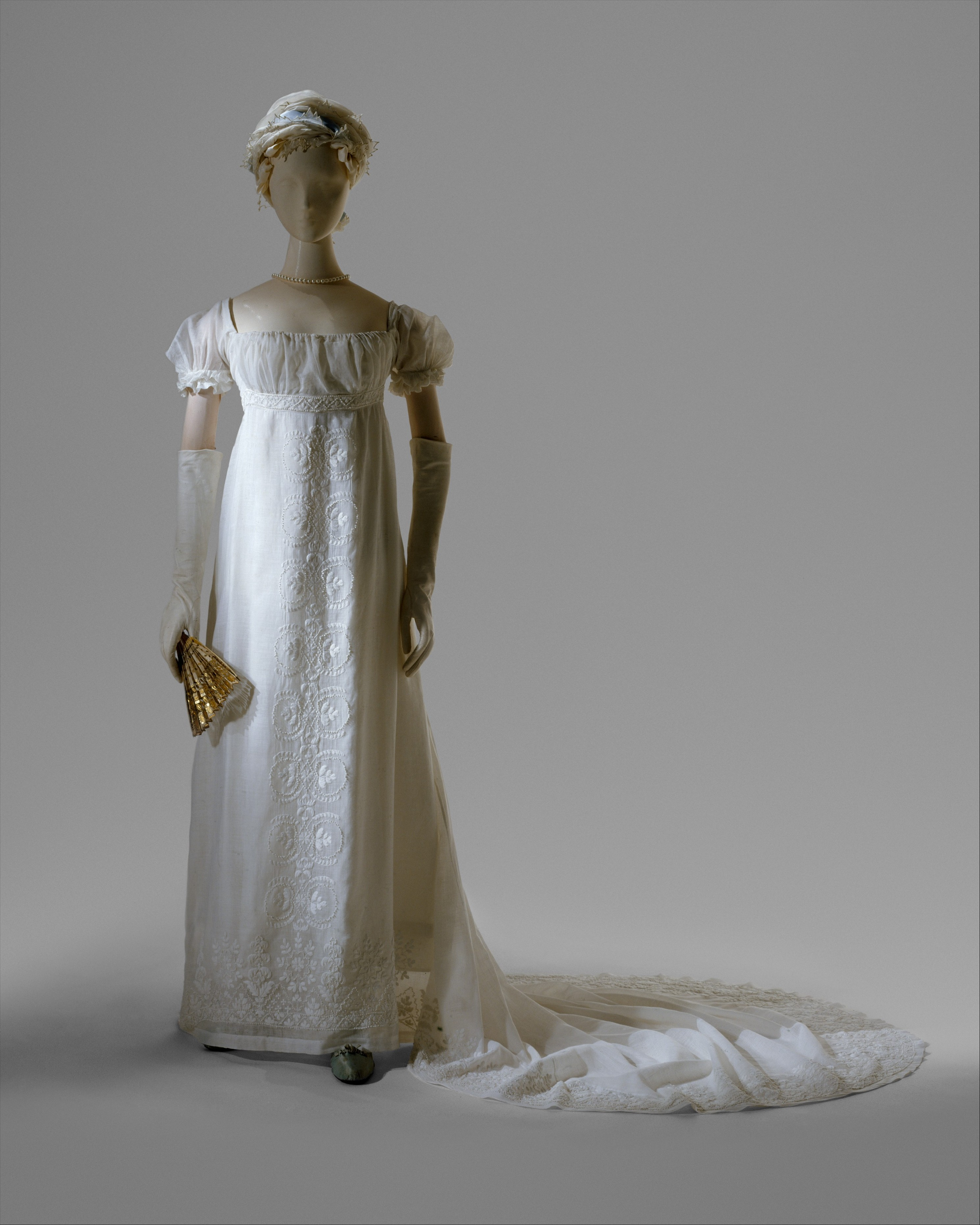
White cotton gown, c. 1804-05

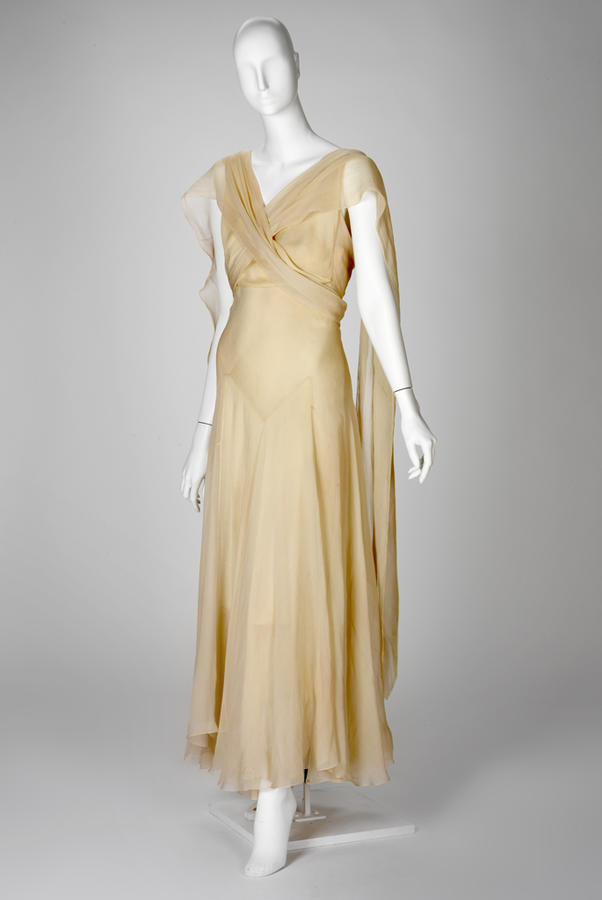
Madeleine Vionnet evening gown, silk chiffon, c.1932

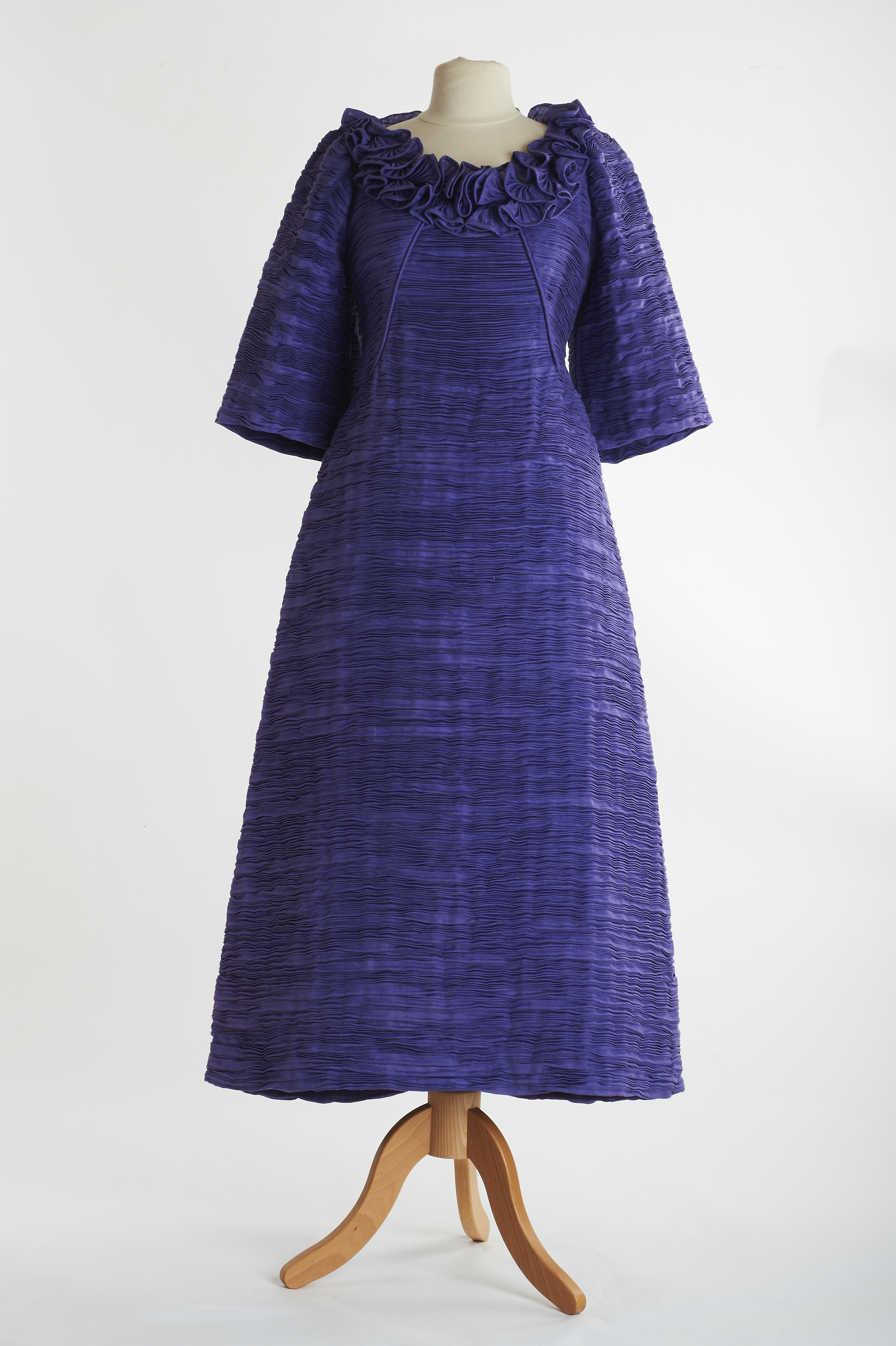
Lavender evening gown by Irish designer Sybil Connolly from c. 1970

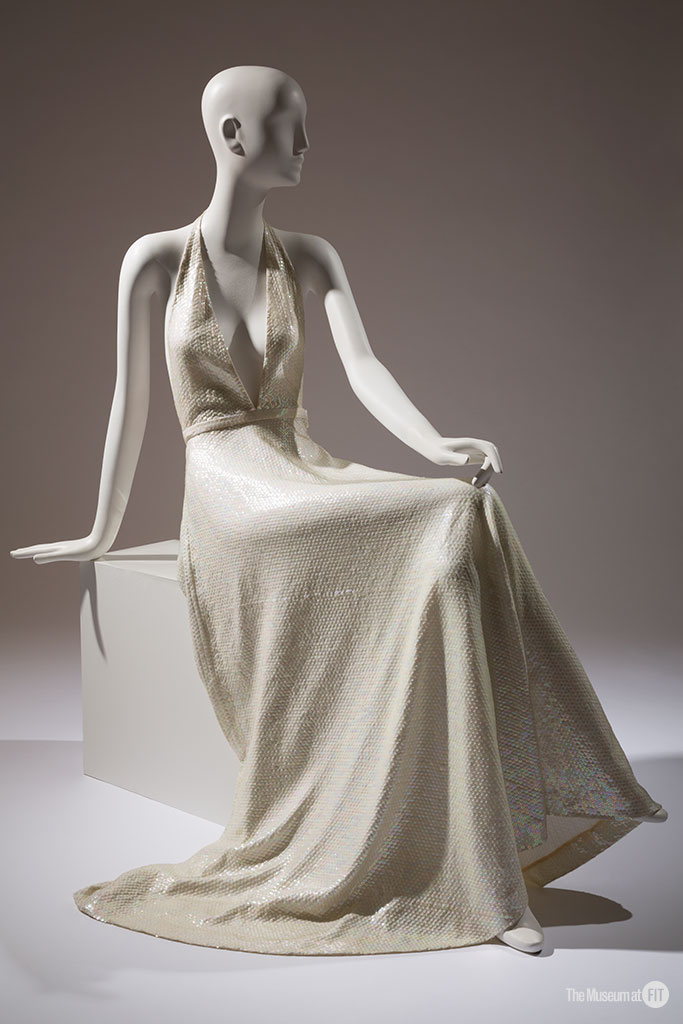
Halston evening dress (1974)

== See also ==
- Ball gown
- Cocktail dress
- Wedding gown
