= Zibeline =

Type of fabric

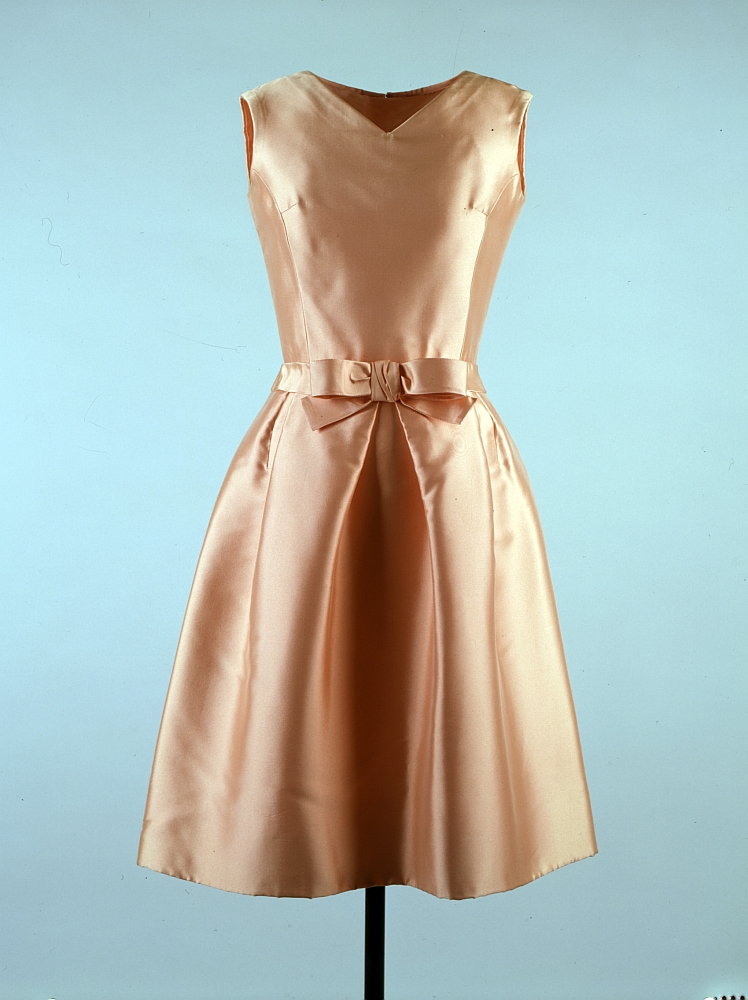
Apricot zibeline dress worn by Jacqueline Kennedy for a daytime boat ride on Lake Pichola, India

Zibeline (/ˈzɪbəliːn/ or /ˈzɪbəlɪn/) is a thick, soft fabric with a long nap. It is usually made of wool, such as mohair or alpaca, but can also be made from the hair of other animals, such as camels.

Zibeline can also refer either to the sable (Martes zibellina) or to its pelt, from which zibeline was originally made.

Zibeline can also refer to a heavy silk fabric with a twill weave, very similar to Mikado. The noted apricot dress designed by Oleg Cassini for U.S. First Lady Jacqueline Kennedy was made in silk zibeline.
