= Fit and flare =

Dress

A fit and flare dress is a dress silhouette featuring a fitted upper body (the "fit") and a full skirt (the "flare").

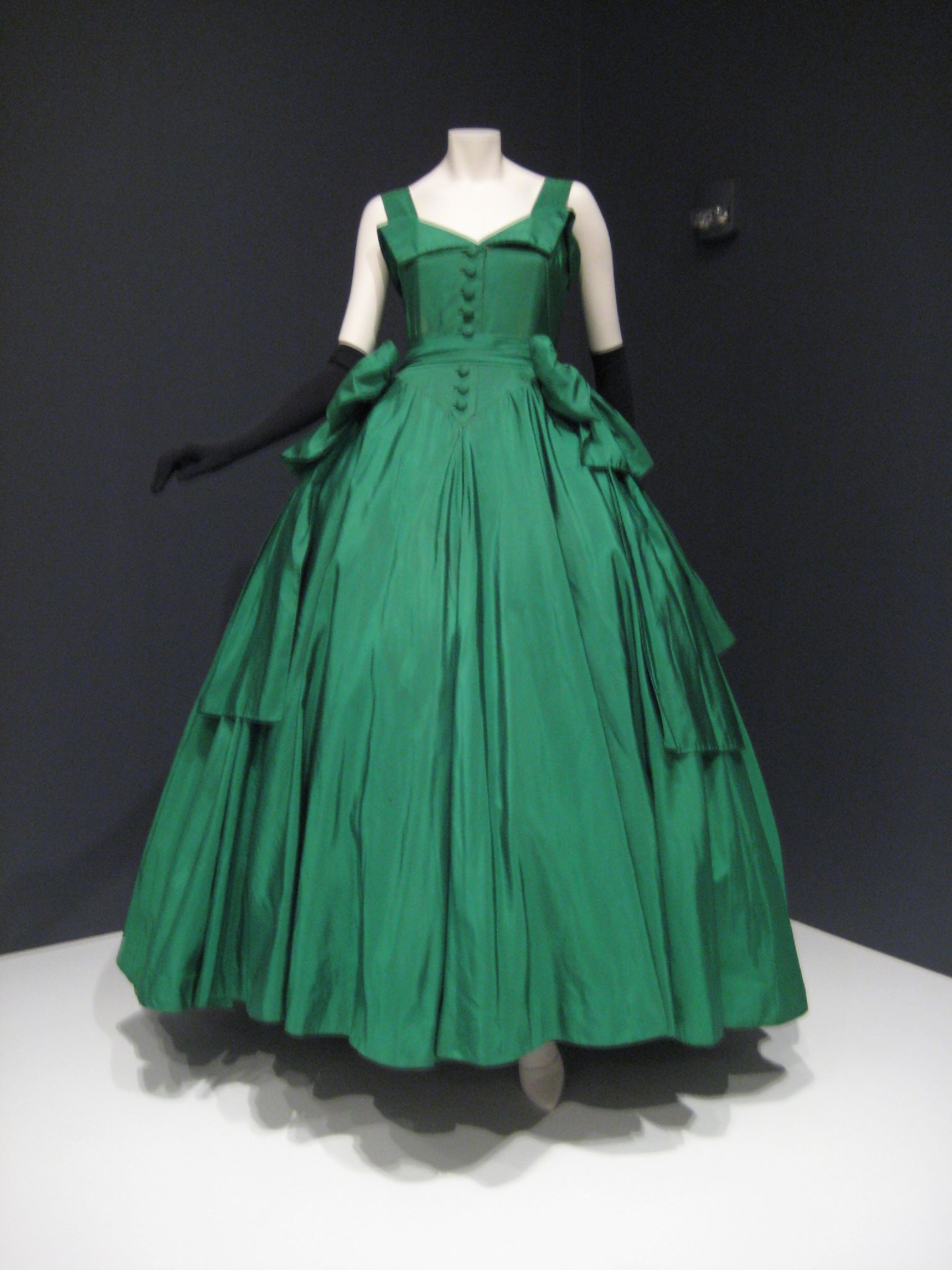
A 1954 Christian Dior gown and evening glove with a fit and flare silhouette.

== Description ==
Like the A-line silhouette, fit and flare dresses feature a fitted upper body and a wide hem. Both silhouettes flatter a wide variety of body types. The difference between the styles is that the fit and flare necessarily includes a fitted waistline while the A-line silhouette does not.

== History ==
The origins of the fit and flare dress can be traced to the 1930s with the move away from the drop-waist silhouette of the 1920s. The fit and flare silhouette is linked to Christian Dior's "New LooK" of a cinched waist and full skirt that became popular in the post-war decades. Fit and flare dresses allowed women to show off the hourglass figure that was in vogue in the era. The flattering nature of the silhouette has ensured its popularity into the present day.
