= British princess =

Princess of the United Kingdom

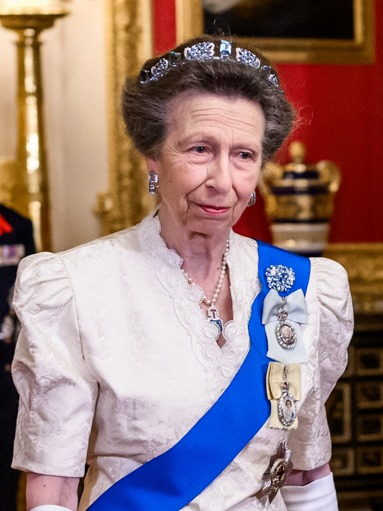
Anne, Princess Royal, daughter of Queen Elizabeth II and princess of the blood

The use of the title of Princess of the United Kingdom of Great Britain and Northern Ireland is entirely at the will of the sovereign, and is now expressed in letters patent. Individuals holding the title of princess will usually also be granted the style of Her Royal Highness (HRH). The current letters patent were issued in 1917 during World War I, with one extension in 2012.

Between 1714 and 1917, pursuant to the then custom, daughters of the monarch and daughters of male-line descendants of a monarch were accorded the rank of a British princess. King George V issued letters patent on 30 November 1917 (issue 30428, Dec. 14, 1917, p. 2.), predefining who held the title, style and rank of a British Princess to restrict the automatic assignment of the title "princess" and the use of the style "Royal Highness" to the following persons:

- the legitimate daughters of a British Sovereign
- the legitimate male line granddaughters of a British sovereign.

On 31 December 2012, Queen Elizabeth II issued letters patent enabling all children of the eldest son of the Prince of Wales to hold the title prince or princess and style Royal Highness, as opposed to only the eldest son (the 1917 patent having extended "prince" to his eldest living son).

The wife of a British prince whose marriage has been approved by the British Sovereign is automatically accorded the status of the prince (princess) and the feminine form of her husband's titles.

== Princesses of the blood royal and princesses by marriage ==
Under the current practice, princesses of the blood royal are the legitimate daughters and the legitimate male line granddaughters of a British sovereign. They are dynasts, that is potential successors to the throne. For these individuals, the title "Princess of the United Kingdom of Great Britain and Northern Ireland" and the style "Her Royal Highness" is an entitlement for life. The title Princess and the style Royal Highness is prefixed to the Christian name, before another title of honour. From 1714 until 1917, the male-line great-granddaughters of the Sovereign were titled "Princess of Great Britain and Ireland" with the style "Highness". Since 1917, the male-line great-granddaughters of the Sovereign have held "the style and title enjoyed by the children of dukes". For example, the daughters of Prince Richard, Duke of Gloucester, a male line grandson of George V, are styled Lady Davina Windsor and Lady Rose Gilman.

The legal wife of a British prince is also entitled to the status and rank of a British princess. If their husband is not the holder of his own substantive title, then the wife of a British prince has the right to be styled as Princess followed by their husband's first given name. However, if their husband is the holder of either a Dukedom or an Earldom then this takes precedence. For example, upon her marriage to Prince Michael of Kent in 1978, Baroness Marie-Christine von Reibnitz assumed the title and style of "Her Royal Highness Princess Michael of Kent". Similarly, upon her marriage to then Prince Richard of Gloucester, the former Birgitte van Deurs assumed the title and style of "Her Royal Highness Princess Richard of Gloucester". Upon marriage, the wife of the prince of Wales becomes "Her Royal Highness The Princess of Wales". Upon marriage, the wife of a royal duke (or earl) becomes "Her Royal Highness The Duchess (or Countess) of X". When Prince Richard of Gloucester succeeded to his father's dukedom in 1974, his wife became "Her Royal Highness The Duchess of Gloucester". Since 1714, only four princesses were at marriage known in their title by their husband's name, since all the others took the duchess form of the royal duke's title. The four are Princess George of Cumberland, Princess Arthur of Connaught, Princess Richard of Gloucester and Princess Michael of Kent.

Princesses by marriage are entitled to the style "Royal Highness" by virtue of marriage, and retain the style if widowed. However, Elizabeth II issued letters patent dated 21 August 1996 stating that any woman divorced from a prince of the United Kingdom would no longer be entitled to the style "Royal Highness". This has so far applied to Diana, Princess of Wales, and Sarah, Duchess of York. The title of HRH is not intrinsically linked to the title of Princess. Diana was restyled as "Diana, Princess of Wales" following her divorce as a courtesy of the late Queen Elizabeth II having been officially styled as The Princess of Wales during marriage. If Diana had ever remarried then she would have lost the right to the style and title completely.

Since the passage of the Royal Marriages Act 1772, there were a few instances in the reign of King George III in which princes of the blood contracted marriages without consent of the king. This meant they were not legally married, denying the woman the lawful style "Her Royal Highness", as well as any title in the peerage. For example, Prince George, Duke of Cambridge, a male-line grandson of King George III, 'married' Sarah Louisa Fairbrother: the marriage was in contravention of the Royal Marriages Act, and therefore legally invalid. Accordingly, the duke's wife was never titled the Duchess of Cambridge or accorded the style "Her Royal Highness". Instead, she was known as "Mrs FitzGeorge". An exception to the rule was created for King Edward VIII following his 1936 abdication. King George VI issued letters patent dated 27 May 1937 that entitled The Duke of Windsor, as Edward was now entitled, "to hold and enjoy for himself only the title, style or attribute of Royal Highness so however that his wife and descendants if any shall not hold the said title, style or attribute".

There is also the case when a princess of the blood royal marries a British prince. She also becomes a princess by marriage and will be addressed in the same way. An example of this situation was the late Princess Alexandra, Duchess of Fife, when she married her cousin Prince Arthur of Connaught and became "Princess Arthur of Connaught, Duchess of Fife".

Typically a princess by marriage should not be called princess followed by her first name. Diana, Princess of Wales, was consistently referred to as "Princess Diana" by fans and the media, but this usage of the title is technically erroneous, as she was not the child of a monarch nor the child of a son of a monarch. However, this tradition was broken once in the past century with Elizabeth II's aunt, Princess Alice, Duchess of Gloucester, being referred to—with permission from the sovereign—in official sources as such following the death of her husband.

== History ==
The use of the titles prince and princess and the styles of Highness and Royal Highness for members of the Royal Family is of fairly recent usage in the British Isles. Before 1714, there was no settled practice regarding the use of the titles prince and princess other than the heir apparent and his wife. Since 1301, the eldest sons of the Kings of England (and later Great Britain and the United Kingdom) have generally been created Prince of Wales and Earl of Chester (though Edward II's eldest son Edward III, was not given the title). Their wives were titled Princess of Wales.

The title Princess Royal came into being in 1642 when Queen Henrietta Maria, the French-born wife of King Charles I, wished to imitate the way the eldest daughter of the French King was styled Madame Royale. However, there was no settled practice on the use of the title princess for the Sovereign's younger daughters or male-line granddaughters. For example, as late as the time of King Charles II, the daughters of his brother James, Duke of York, both of whom became Queens regnant, were called simply "The Lady Mary" and "The Lady Anne". The future Queen Anne was styled princess in her marriage treaty to Prince George of Denmark and then styled "Princess Anne of Denmark" once married. However, in exile at Saint-Germain-en-Laye, the deposed James II & VII gave the title of Princess Royal to his last daughter, Louisa Maria (1692–1712).

After the accession of George Louis of Hanover as King George I, the children, grandchildren, and male line great-grandchildren of the British Sovereign were automatically titled "Prince or Princess of Great Britain and Ireland" and styled "Royal Highness" (in the case of children and grandchildren) or "Highness" (in the case of male line great-grandchildren). Queen Victoria confirmed this practice in letters patent dated 30 January 1864 (the first Act of the Prerogative dealing with the princely title in general terms).

On 31 December 2012, Elizabeth II issued letters patent enabling all children of the eldest son of the Prince of Wales to enjoy the princely title and style of Royal Highness, as opposed to only the eldest son.

== Styling of princesses ==
=== Princesses of the blood royal ===
- Daughter of a Sovereign: HRH The Princess N (e.g. HRH The Princess Margaret).
  - The style HRH The Princess Royal is customarily (but not automatically) granted by the Sovereign, when vacant, to the Sovereign's eldest daughter.
- Daughter of a son of a Sovereign: HRH Princess N of X, where X is the territorial designation of their father's senior peerage; e.g. HRH Princess Alexandra of Kent, HRH Princess Charlotte of Wales, HRH Princess Lilibet of Sussex.
  - Prior to Princess Charlotte, a daughter of the Prince of Wales: HRH Princess N
  - Prior to 1917, a daughter of a son of a son of a Sovereign: HH Princess N of X
- From 31 December 2012, daughter of the eldest son of the Prince of Wales: HRH Princess N of X (e.g. HRH Princess Charlotte of Cambridge until 2022).

When a princess marries, she still takes on her husband's title. If the title is higher than (or equal to) the one she possesses, she will normally be styled using the female equivalent. If her husband has a lower title or style, her style as a princess remains in use, although it may then be combined with her style by marriage, e.g. HRH The Princess Beatrice, Princess Henry of Battenberg, HRH The Princess Louise, Duchess of Argyll, or HRH Princess Alice, Countess of Athlone – if that princess had a territorial designation, she may cease its use. It has become customary, however, for a princess who has been granted the title of HRH The Princess Royal to not combine it with her style by marriage: Princess Anne remains HRH The Princess Royal rather than HRH The Princess Royal, Lady Laurence.

=== Princesses by marriage ===
A princess by marriage is addressed as "Princess Husband's name"; this is akin to a woman being referred to as "Mrs. John Smith". The only recent time this has broken tradition is with the sovereign's express consent. Namely, with Queen Elizabeth II's aunts Princess Alice, Duchess of Gloucester, and Princess Marina, Duchess of Kent. The former was not a princess by birth, while the latter was born a princess of Greece and Denmark. Both women asked the Queen to use their given names after their husbands' deaths.

- Wife of a prince who has a peerage: HRH The Duchess/Countess of X, or, prior to 1917, possibly HH (e.g. HRH The Duchess of Edinburgh and HRH The Duchess of Sussex)
  - Since 1996, divorced wife of a prince who held a peerage: N, Duchess/Countess of X. (e.g. Diana, Princess of Wales, and Sarah, Duchess of York)
- Wife of a son of a Sovereign, who has no peerage: HRH The Princess Husband.
- Wife of another prince who has no peerage: HRH Princess Husband of X. (X usually taken from father's Dukedom; e.g. HRH Princess Michael of Kent)
- Prior to 1917, the wife of a prince in the third generation, who has no peerage: HH Princess Husband of X.

=== Exceptions ===
- There were only two historical princesses who would have been exceptions to the 1917 rule, but they died long before that. The sisters Sophia Matilda and Caroline Augusta Maria born in 1773 and 1774 were male line great-granddaughters of George II. All of the other exceptions were still alive in 1917 and were no longer permitted to use the style of HRH and Princess.

There have been several exceptions in recent history to these rules, but all have come by order of the Sovereign, mostly through letters patent.

- In November 1905, King Edward VII allowed the two daughters of Louise, Princess Royal to use a princely title and the style of Highness. They were not entitled to the style of Royal Highness. The 1917 letters patent which stripped great-grandchildren of a British sovereign of the style of Highness with a princely title was complicated as it did not technically overrule Edward VII's letters patent, as the former practice was mostly an unspoken courtesy as opposed to a written rule. The elder sister, Princess Alexandra, Duchess of Fife, was already married by that time, to Prince Arthur of Connaught: he was a male-line grandson of Victoria, and so entitled to use the style of Royal Highness. Alexandra was therefore styled Her Royal Highness Princess Arthur of Connaught, Duchess of Fife from her 1913 marriage for the rest of her life, and the 1917 letters patent did not change this. Her younger sister, Princess Maud, on the other hand, was unmarried in 1917. Until her 1923 marriage, she continued to use the title of "Princess" granted to her in 1905. Upon her marriage to Charles, Lord Carnegie, however, she chose to be known as Lady Maud Carnegie (or, from 1941, The Countess of Southesk), dropping her princely title.
- Charles III had the style and title His Royal Highness Prince Charles of Edinburgh from birth in 1948, even though he was a female-line grandchild of the Sovereign, being born to the future Elizabeth II, then Princess Elizabeth, Duchess of Edinburgh, during the reign of Elizabeth's father, King George VI, who had no sons. George VI issued letters patent on 22 October 1948, granting the style to Elizabeth's children. Under the same exception, Anne, Princess Royal was styled Her Royal Highness Princess Anne of Edinburgh from her birth in 1950 until her mother's accession in 1952.
- In 1961, when her son married, the Duchess of Kent asked Elizabeth II to extend the use of a princely title to precede her first name, in order to avoid confusion with her daughter-in-law, Katharine Worsley, the new Duchess of Kent. As she was born a princess of Greece and Denmark, this was not incredibly notable, although traditionally she would have been styled as Her Royal Highness The Dowager Duchess of Kent. After this she was styled as Her Royal Highness Princess Marina, Duchess of Kent.
- In 1974, the Duchess of Gloucester asked Elizabeth II for the same title as her sister-in-law, then Princess Marina, Duchess of Kent, with a princely title preceding her first name. Unlike Princess Marina, Alice had never been a princess in her own right, thus this allowance was far more unusual. Instead of being referred to as Her Royal Highness The Dowager Duchess of Gloucester, as is customary, she became Her Royal Highness Princess Alice, Duchess of Gloucester.
- In 2003, upon the request of Elizabeth II's youngest son, Edward, his children would be styled as the children of an earl, though still retaining their royal titles. The children would be able to decide if they would want to use the title once they turned eighteen. As male-line grandchildren of a British monarch, Lady Louise Mountbatten-Windsor and James, Earl of Wessex, would traditionally enjoy a princely title and style.
- In December 2012, Elizabeth II issued letters patent that stated that all children born to the eldest child of the Prince of Wales (then her son Charles), would enjoy a princely title and style, and not just the eldest son. Although in effect since 2012, it was not used in practice until the birth of Princess Charlotte in 2015.

== List of princesses of the blood royal since 1714 ==
Image	Full Name	Arms	Lifespan	Royal lineage	Right	Notes
	Sophia Dorothea		1687–1757	Only daughter of King George I	Created Princess by the sovereign	Gained title in 1714 upon accession of her father as King George I.; Queen consort of Prussia 1713–1740.
	Anne		1709–1759	1st daughter of King George II	Created Princess by the sovereign	Gained title in 1714 upon accession of her grandfather as King George I. Princess of Orange.
	Amelia Sophia Eleanor		1711–1786	2nd daughter of King George II	Created Princess by the sovereign	Gained title in 1714 upon accession of her grandfather as King George I.
	Caroline Elizabeth		1713–1757	3rd daughter of King George II	Created Princess by the sovereign	Gained title in 1714 upon accession of her grandfather as King George I.
	Mary		1723–1772	4th daughter of King George II	Princess from birth	Landgravine of Hesse-Kassel
	Louise		1724–1751	5th daughter of King George II	Princess from birth	Queen consort of Denmark 1746–1751.
	Augusta Frederica		1737–1813	Granddaughter of King George II	Princess from birth	1st daughter of Frederick, Prince of Wales; Duchess of Brunswick 1780–1806.
	Elizabeth Caroline		1741–1759	Granddaughter of King George II	Princess from birth	2nd daughter of Frederick, Prince of Wales
	Louisa Anne		1749–1768	Granddaughter of King George II	Princess from birth	3rd daughter of Frederick, Prince of Wales
	Caroline Matilda		1751–1775	Granddaughter of King George II	Princess from birth	4th daughter of Prince Frederick; Queen consort of Denmark and Norway 1767–1775.
	Charlotte Augusta Matilda		1766–1828	1st daughter of King George III	Princess from birth	Held the title 'The Princess Charlotte' from birth and formally styled Princess Royal in 1789. Queen consort of Württemberg 1806–1816.
	Augusta Sophia		1768–1840	2nd daughter of King George III	Princess from birth	
	Elizabeth		1770–1840	3rd daughter of King George III	Princess from birth	Landgravine of Hesse-Homburg
	Mary		1776–1857	4th daughter of King George III	Princess from birth	Duchess of Gloucester and Edinburgh
	Sophia Matilda		1777–1848	5th daughter of King George III	Princess from birth	
	Amelia		1783–1810	6th daughter of King George III	Princess from birth	
	Sophia Matilda		1773–1844	Great-Granddaughter of King George II	Princess from birth	1st daughter of Prince William Henry, Duke of Gloucester and Edinburgh; Granted style of Royal Highness in 1816.
	Caroline Augusta Maria		1774–1775	Great-Granddaughter of King George II	Princess from birth	2nd daughter of Prince William Henry, Duke of Gloucester and Edinburgh
	Charlotte Augusta		1796–1817	Only daughter of King George IV	Princess from birth	Death due to childbirth, left Kingdom without direct line heir.; Princess of Saxe-Coburg-Saalfeld.
	Charlotte Augusta Louisa		1819–1819	1st daughter of King William IV	Princess from birth	
	Elizabeth Georgiana Adelaide		1820–1821	2nd daughter of King William IV	Princess from birth	
	Alexandrina Victoria later, Queen Victoria		1819–1901	Granddaughter of King George III	Princess from birth	Only daughter of Prince Edward, Duke of Kent and Strathearn; Title held until her accession as Queen Victoria in 1837.
	Augusta Caroline Charlotte Elizabeth Mary Sophia Louise		1822–1916	Granddaughter of King George III	Princess from birth	1st daughter of Prince Adolphus, Duke of Cambridge; Grand Duchess of Mecklenburg-Strelitz 1860–1904.
	Mary Adelaide Wilhemina Elizabeth		1833–1897	Granddaughter of King George III	Princess from birth	2nd daughter of Prince Adolphus, Duke of Cambridge; Duchess of Teck; Mother of Queen Mary
	Victoria Adelaide Mary Louisa		1840–1901	1st daughter of Queen Victoria	Princess from birth	Held the title 'The Princess Victoria' from birth and styled 'The Princess Royal' in 1841.; German Empress consort and Queen consort of Prussia 1888; Mother of William II, German Emperor and King of Prussia.
	Alice Maud Mary		1843–1878	2nd daughter of Queen Victoria	Princess from birth	Grand Duchess of Hesse and by Rhine 1877–1878.
	Helena Augusta Victoria		1846–1923	3rd daughter of Queen Victoria	Princess from birth	Princess Christian of Schleswig-Holstein
	Frederica Sophie Marie Henrietta Amelia Theresa		1848–1926	Great-granddaughter of King George III	Princess from birth	1st daughter of George V of Hanover; Title from birth until 30 November 1917.
	Louise Caroline Alberta		1848–1939	4th daughter of Queen Victoria	Princess from birth	Duchess of Argyll; 1900–1939
	Marie Ernestine Josephine Adolphine Henrietta Theresa Elisabeth Alexandrina		1849–1904	Great-granddaughter of King George III	Princess from birth	2nd daughter of George V of Hanover
	Beatrice Mary Victoria Feodore		1857–1944	5th daughter of Queen Victoria	Princess from birth	Princess Henry of Battenberg
	Louise Victoria Alexandra Dagmar		1867–1931	1st daughter of King Edward VII	Princess from birth	Held the title 'Princess Louise of Wales' from birth, 'The Princess Louise' from her father's accession in 1901; Styled 'The Princess Royal' in 1905.
	Victoria Alexandra Olga Mary		1868–1935	2nd daughter of King Edward VII	Princess from birth	Held the title 'Princess Victoria of Wales' from birth, 'The Princess Victoria' from her father's accession in 1901.; Held title until death.
	Maud Charlotte Mary Victoria		1869–1938	3rd daughter of King Edward VII	Princess from birth	Queen consort of Norway 1905–1938.
	Marie Alexandra Victoria		1875–1938	Granddaughter of Queen Victoria	Princess from birth	1st daughter of Prince Alfred, Duke of Edinburgh; Queen consort of Romania 1914–1927.
	Victoria Melita		1876–1936	Granddaughter of Queen Victoria	Princess from birth	2nd daughter of Prince Alfred, Duke of Edinburgh; Grand Duchess of Hesse and by Rhine 1894–1901.
	Alexandra Louise Olga Victoria		1878–1942	Granddaughter of Queen Victoria	Princess from birth	3rd daughter of Prince Alfred, Duke of Edinburgh
	Marie Louise Victoria Caroline Amelia Alexandra Augusta Frederica		1879–1948	Great-great-granddaughter of King George III	Princess from birth	Title from birth until 30 November 1917; 1st daughter of Crown Prince Ernest Augustus of Hanover
	Margaret Victoria Charlotte Augusta Norah		1882–1920	Granddaughter of Queen Victoria	Princess from birth	1st daughter of Prince Arthur, Duke of Connaught and Strathearn; Crown Princess of Sweden 1907–1920.
	Alexandra Marie Louise Olga Elizabeth Theresa Vera		1882–1963	Great-great-granddaughter of King George III	Princess from birth	Title from birth until 1917; 2nd daughter of Crown Prince Ernst Augustus of Hanover.
	Alice Mary Victoria Augusta Pauline		1883–1981	Granddaughter of Queen Victoria	Princess from birth	Only daughter of Prince Leopold, Duke of Albany.
	Beatrice Leopoldine Victoria		1884–1966	Granddaughter of Queen Victoria	Princess from birth	4th daughter of Prince Alfred, Duke of Edinburgh.
	Olga Adelaide Louise Marie Alexandrina Agnes		1884–1958	Great-great-granddaughter of King George III	Princess from birth	Title from birth until 30 November 1917; 3rd daughter of Crown Prince Ernst Augustus of Hanover.
	Victoria Patricia Helena Elizabeth		1886–1974	Granddaughter of Queen Victoria	Princess from birth	Title held from her birth until 1919 when she relinquished her title and style upon marriage, * 2nd daughter of Prince Arthur, Duke of Connaught and Strathearn.
	Alexandra Victoria Alberta Edwina Louise		1891–1959	Granddaughter in female line of King Edward VII	Created Princess by the sovereign	Title granted by Letters Patent of 1905, * 1st daughter of Princess Louise, Duchess of Fife.
	Maud Alexandra Victoria Georgina Bertha		1893–1945	Granddaughter in female line of King Edward VII	Created Princess by the sovereign	Title granted by Letters Patent of 1905, ceased use of title after her marriage in 1923 occasionally although it was never formally relinquished.; 2nd daughter of Princess Louise, Duchess of Fife.
	Victoria Alexandra Alice Mary		1897–1965	Only daughter of King George V	Princess from birth	Held the title 'Princess Mary of York' from birth.; Held the title 'Princess Mary of Cornwall and York' from 22 January to 9 November 1901.; Held the title 'Princess Mary of Wales' from 2 November 1901 till her father's accession.; 'The Princess Mary' on her father's accession in 1910; Styled 'The Princess Royal' in 1932.
	Sibylla Calma Maria Alice Bathildis Feodora		1907–1972	Great-granddaughter of Queen Victoria	Princess from birth	Title from birth until 30 November 1917; 1st daughter of Charles Edward, Duke of Albany.; Duchess of Västerbotten from 1932 to her death; Mother of King Carl XVI Gustaf of Sweden.
	Caroline Matilda Helen Louise Augusta Beatrice		1912–1983	Great-granddaughter of Queen Victoria	Princess from birth	Title from birth until 30 November 1917; 2nd daughter of Prince Charles Edward, Duke of Albany.
	Frederica Louise		1917–1981	Great-great-great-granddaughter of King George III	Princess from birth	Title from birth until 30 November 1917; Only daughter of Ernest Augustus, Prince of Hanover and Duke of Brunswick.
	Elizabeth Alexandra Mary later, Queen Elizabeth II		1926–2022	1st daughter of King George VI	Princess from birth	Held the title "Princess Elizabeth of York" from birth; "The Princess Elizabeth" from her father's accession in 1936 until her succession in 1952 as Queen Elizabeth II
	Margaret Rose		1930–2002	2nd daughter of King George VI	Princess from birth	Held the title "Princess Margaret of York" from birth; "The Princess Margaret" from her father's accession in 1936; "The Princess Margaret, Countess of Snowdon" after her marriage in 1960; Held title until death.
	Alexandra Helen Elizabeth Olga Christabel		1936–present	Granddaughter of King George V	Princess from birth	Only daughter of Prince George, Duke of Kent; Styled Princess Alexandra, The Hon Mrs (Angus) Ogilvy from her marriage until 1988.; Styled Princess Alexandra, The Hon Lady Ogilvy from 1988.
	Anne Elizabeth Alice Louise		1950–present	Only daughter of Queen Elizabeth II	Princess from birth	Held the title "Princess Anne of Edinburgh" from birth.; Became "The Princess Anne" on her mother's accession.; Styled "The Princess Royal" in 1987.
	Beatrice Elizabeth Mary		1988–present	Granddaughter of Queen Elizabeth II	Princess from birth	1st daughter of Andrew Mountbatten-Windsor.; Held the title "Princess Beatrice of York" from birth until her marriage in 2020.; After marriage styled Princess Beatrice, Mrs Edoardo Mapelli Mozzi.
	Eugenie Victoria Helena		1990–present	Granddaughter of Queen Elizabeth II	Princess from birth	2nd daughter of Andrew Mountbatten-Windsor.; Held the title "Princess Eugenie of York" from birth until her marriage in 2018.; After marriage styled Princess Eugenie, Mrs Jack Brooksbank.
	Louise Alice Elizabeth Mary		2003–present	Granddaughter of Queen Elizabeth II	Princess from birth	Only daughter of Prince Edward, Duke of Edinburgh; styled as a duke's daughter per her parents' wishes and the will of the sovereign. (see her titles and styles).
	Charlotte Elizabeth Diana		2015–present	Granddaughter of King Charles III	Princess from birth	Only daughter of William, Prince of Wales; Held the title "Princess Charlotte of Cambridge" from birth until her grandfather's accession on 8 September 2022.; Held the title "Princess Charlotte of Cornwall and Cambridge" from 8 September to 9 September 2022.; Holds the title "Princess Charlotte of Wales".
	Lilibet Diana		2021–present	Granddaughter of King Charles III	Princess since the accession of her grandfather	Only daughter of Prince Harry, Duke of Sussex; Holds the title "Princess Lilibet of Sussex".; Known as Lilibet Mountbatten-Windsor from birth until her grandfather's accession on 8 September 2022.

== List of princesses by marriage since 1714 ==
Unless specified title held from marriage to death or present day
Title of Princess where spouse's title was eliminated by Letters Patent issued 30 November 1917 or Order in Council in 1919

Image	Name	Arms	Lifespan	Marriage	Husband	Comments
	Princess Wilhelmina Charlotte Caroline of Brandenburg-Ansbach		1683–1737	1705	George of Hanover	Gained title by accession of her father-in-law as King George I in 1714 and held it until her husband's accession as King George II in 1727.
	Princess Augusta of Saxe-Gotha-Altenburg		1719–1772	1736	Frederick, Prince of Wales	Princess Augusta of Saxe-Gotha by birth. On marriage, she became Her Royal Highness The Princess of Wales.
	Maria Walpole		1736–1807	1766	Prince William Henry, Duke of Gloucester and Edinburgh	Gained title by her second marriage.
	Anne Luttrell		1742–1808	1771	Prince Henry, Duke of Cumberland and Strathearn	Gained title by her second marriage.
	Princess Friederike Charlotte Ulrike Katharina of Prussia		1767–1820	1791	Prince Frederick, Duke of York and Albany	Princess Frederica Charlotte of Prussia by birth. On marriage, she became Her Royal Highness The Duchess of York and Albany.
	Duchess Caroline Amelia Elizabeth of Brunswick-Wolfenbüttel		1768–1821	1795	George, Prince of Wales	Held title until her husband's accession as King George IV in 1820.
	Duchess Friederike Luise Caroline Sophie Alexandrine of Mecklenburg-Strelitz		1778–1841	1815	Prince Ernest Augustus, Duke of Cumberland and Teviotdale	Gained title by her third marriage. Became Queen of Hanover on her husband's accession as King Ernest Augustus in 1837.
	Princess Augusta Wilhelmina Louisa of Hesse-Kassel		1797–1889	1818	Prince Adolphus, Duke of Cambridge	Her Serene Highness Princess Augusta Wilhelmina Louise of Hesse by birth. On marriage, she became Her Royal Highness The Duchess of Cambridge.
	Princess Marie Louise Victoire of Saxe-Coburg-Saalfeld		1786–1861	1818	Prince Edward, Duke of Kent and Strathearn	Gained title by her second marriage.
	Princess Adelaide Amelia Louise Theresa Caroline of Saxe-Meiningen		1792–1849	1818	Prince William, Duke of Clarence and St Andrews	Held title until her husband's accession as King William IV in 1830.
	Princess Alexandrina Marie Wilhelmina Catherine Charlotte Theresa Henrietta Louise Pauline Elizabeth Frederica Georgina of Saxe-Altenburg		1818–1907	1843	George, Crown Prince of Hanover	Became Queen of Hanover on her husband's accession as King George V in 1851.
	Princess Alexandra Caroline Marie Charlotte Louise Julia of Denmark		1844–1925	1863	Albert Edward, Prince of Wales	Held title until her husband's accession as King Edward VII in 1901.
	Grand Duchess Maria Alexandrovna of Russia		1853–1920	1874	Prince Alfred, Duke of Edinburgh	Held title until her husband's accession as Duke of Saxe-Coburg and Gotha in 1893.
	Princess Thyra Amalie Caroline Charlotte Anna of Denmark		1853–1933	1878	Ernest Augustus, Crown Prince of Hanover	Husband lost British title of Prince in 1917.
	Princess Louise Margaret Alexandra Victoria Agnes of Prussia		1860–1917	1879	Prince Arthur, Duke of Connaught and Strathearn	Her Royal Highness Princess Louise Margaret of Prussia by birth. On prior to her marriage, she became: Her Royal Highness The Duchess of Connaught and Strathearn.
	Princess Helen Frederica Augusta of Waldeck and Pyrmont		1861–1922	1882	Prince Leopold, Duke of Albany	Princess Helen of Waldeck and Pyrmont by birth. On marriage, she became Her Royal Highness The Duchess of Albany.
	Princess Victoria Mary Augusta Louise Olga Pauline Claudine Agnes of Teck		1867–1953	1893	Prince George, Duke of York	Held title until her husband's accession as King George V in 1910.
	Princess Victoria Adelaide Helena Louise Mary Frederica of Schleswig-Holstein		1885–1970	1905	Prince Charles Edward, Duke of Albany	Husband lost British title of prince in 1919.
	Princess Victoria Louise Adelaide Matilda Charlotte of Prussia		1892–1980	1913	Ernest Augustus, Duke of Brunswick	Husband lost British title of Prince in 1917. Princess Viktoria Luise was born Princess of Prussia being the only daughter of the German Emperor Wilhelm II.
	Alexandra Victoria Alberta Edwina Louise		1891–1959	1913	Prince Arthur of Connaught	Princess by Letters Patent of 1905, Daughter of Princess Louise, Duchess of Fife. Became Princess by marriage as wife of Prince Arthur of Connaught
	Lady Elizabeth Angela Marguerite Bowes-Lyon		1900–2002	1923	Prince Albert, Duke of York	Held title until her husband's accession as King George VI in 1936.
	Princess Marina of Greece and Denmark		1906–1968	1934	Prince George, Duke of Kent	Princess of Greece and Denmark by birth. However, when she was widowed she reverted her title to Princess Marina, Duchess of Kent, styling herself as a princess suo jure in the UK.
	Lady Alice Christabel Montagu Douglas Scott		1901–2004	1935	Prince Henry, Duke of Gloucester	When she was widowed in 1974 she was granted special permission to style herself as a princess suo jure.
	Katharine Lucy Mary Worsley		1933–2025	1961	Prince Edward, Duke of Kent	On marriage, she became Her Royal Highness The Duchess of Kent.
	Birgitte Eva van Deurs Henriksen		1946–present	1972	Prince Richard, Duke of Gloucester	On marriage, she became Her Royal Highness Princess Richard of Gloucester from 8 July 1972 until 10 June 1974. Upon the death of her father-in-law on 10 June 1974, her style changed to Her Royal Highness The Duchess of Gloucester.
	Baroness Marie-Christine Anna Agnes Hedwig Ida von Reibnitz		1945–present	1978	Prince Michael of Kent	Gained title by her second marriage.
	Lady Diana Frances Spencer		1961–1997	1981	Charles, Prince of Wales	On marriage, she became Her Royal Highness The Princess of Wales. She lost style of Her Royal Highness upon divorce, and was restyled as "Diana, Princess of Wales".
	Sarah Margaret Ferguson		1959–present	1986	Prince Andrew, Duke of York (later Andrew Mountbatten-Windsor)	On marriage, she became Her Royal Highness The Duchess of York. She lost style of Her Royal Highness upon divorce, and was restyled as "Sarah, Duchess of York".
	Sophie Helen Rhys-Jones		1965–present	1999	Prince Edward, Duke of Edinburgh	On marriage, she became Her Royal Highness The Countess of Wessex and Viscountess Severn. On 10 March 2019, the Queen granted the Earldom of Forfar to the Earl of Wessex for use in Scotland. On 10 March 2023, her husband become Duke of Edinburgh; Sophie is thus Her Royal Highness The Duchess of Edinburgh.
	Camilla Rosemary Shand		1947–present	2005	Charles, Prince of Wales	By her second marriage she became: Her Royal Highness the Duchess of Cornwall, Duchess of Rothesay, Countess of Chester etc. She also held the title of Princess of Wales but did not use it because the title became strongly associated with its previous holder, Diana. On 9 April 2021, she became Duchess of Edinburgh. She held the titles until her husband's accession as Charles III on 8 September 2022, when she became Her Majesty The Queen.
	Catherine Elizabeth Middleton		1982–present	2011	William, Prince of Wales	On marriage, she became Her Royal Highness The Duchess of Cambridge, Countess of Strathearn, and Baroness Carrickfergus. On 8 September 2022, she became Her Royal Highness The Duchess of Cornwall and Cambridge. On 9 September 2022, she became Her Royal Highness The Princess of Wales.
	Rachel Meghan Markle		1981–present	2018	Prince Harry, Duke of Sussex	On marriage, she became Her Royal Highness The Duchess of Sussex, Countess of Dumbarton, and Baroness Kilkeel. The Duke and Duchess of Sussex no longer publicly use the style of Royal Highness after stepping back as senior members of the Royal Family but they are still referred to as "His/Her Royal Highness" in legal settings.

=== Notes ===
Each of the following women married a royal prince but as their marriages were invalid under the Royal Marriages Act 1772, they did not become princesses:

- Maria Anne Fitzherbert, married George, Prince of Wales in 1785
- Lady Augusta Murray, married Prince Augustus Frederick, Duke of Sussex in 1793
- Lady Cecilia Buggin, married Prince Augustus Frederick, Duke of Sussex. She was later created Duchess of Inverness.
- Sarah Louisa Fairbrother, married Prince George, Duke of Cambridge in 1847

Although Wallis Simpson married the Duke of Windsor in 1937, and he was a British prince with the style His Royal Highness, having been confirmed as such by letters patent 27 May 1937 from his brother, George VI, Wallis and her descendants from the marriage were expressly denied the style of "Royal Highness" by the same letters patent before she married him. As a duke's wife, she was always styled Her Grace The Duchess of Windsor. Her husband, the Duke of Windsor, insisted that staff and friends should refer to her as Her Royal Highness.

There have been two instances where a British princess married a British prince: first The Princess Mary, daughter of George III, who married her first cousin Prince William Frederick, Duke of Gloucester and Edinburgh; secondly Princess Alexandra, Duchess of Fife, granddaughter of Edward VII, who married her first cousin once removed Prince Arthur of Connaught. In the first instance Princess Mary was of higher rank and the Duke of Gloucester and his sister were elevated from the style His/Her Highness to His/Her Royal Highness. In the second instance Princess Alexandra had been granted the style Her Highness by her grandfather the King; as the wife of a Prince she received the style Her Royal Highness.

There is also the curious case of Princess Victoria Eugénie of Battenberg, later Queen Victoria Eugenia of Spain (the daughter of Princess Beatrice and Prince Henry of Battenberg). Prior to her marriage to Alfonso XIII of Spain in May 1906, she was styled Her Highness Princess Victoria Eugénie of Battenberg. On 3 April 1906 Edward VII, in order to elevate her standing prior to her wedding, raised her status to Royal Highness per royal declaration which read: "Whitehall April 3, 1906. The KING has been graciously pleased to declare and ordain that His Majesty's niece, Her Highness Princess Victoria Eugenie Julia Ena, daughter of Her Royal Highness the Princess Beatrice Mary Victoria Feodore (Princess Henry of Battenberg), shall henceforth be styled and called "Her Royal Highness"; And to command that the said Royal concession and declaration be registered in His Majesty's College of Arms." Edward VII concurrently issued a Royal Warrant on the elevation which read: "Our Will and Pleasure is and we do hereby declare and ordain that from and after the date of this Warrant our most Dear Niece Princess Victoria Eugénie Julia Ena, only daughter of Our most Dear Sister Beatrice Mary Victoria Feodore (Princess Henry of Battenberg) shall be styled entitled and called "Her Royal Highness" before her name and such Titles and Appellations which to her belong in all Deeds Records Instruments or Documents whatsoever wherein she may at any time hereafter be named or described. And We do hereby authorize and empower Our said most Dear Niece henceforth at all times to assume and use and to be called and named by the Style, Title and Appellation of "Her Royal Highness" accordingly. Given at Our Court of Saint James's, the Third day of April 1906: in the Sixth Year of Our Reign. By His Majesty's Command. M Gladstone" Whether this made her a British Royal Princess is the subject of debate.

The former Lady Diana Spencer lost the prefix of Her Royal Highness upon her divorce in August 1996, and was restyled as "Diana, Princess of Wales". Buckingham Palace issued a press release on the day the decree absolute of divorce was issued, announcing Diana's change of title, but made it clear that Diana continued to be a member of the British Royal Family. This was confirmed by the deputy coroner of the Queen's Household, Baroness Butler-Sloss, after a pre-hearing on 8 January 2007: "I am satisfied that at her death, Diana, Princess of Wales continued to be a member of the Royal Household." This appears to have been confirmed in the High Court judicial review matter of Al Fayed & Ors v Butler-Sloss. In that case, three High Court judges accepted submissions that the "very name 'Coroner to the Queen's Household' gave the appearance of partiality in the context of inquests into the deaths of two people, one of whom was a member of the Family and the other was not."

== See also ==
- List of current British princes and princesses
- House of Windsor
