= List of current British princes and princesses =

This is a list of living British royal family members who, through royal descent or marriage, currently hold the rank of Prince or Princess of the United Kingdom of Great Britain and Northern Ireland. There are currently 17 living princes and princesses by birthright, and 5 women who are princesses by marriage.

Andrew Mountbatten-Windsor, who is still alive at 66, was a prince from 1960 until his title was removed in 2025 due to allegations of sexual abuse.

== By birthright ==
Place in line of succession	Image	Name	Arms	Age	Royal lineage	Spouse
Descendants of Charles III
1		William, Prince of Wales		44	Son	Catherine Middleton
2		Prince George of Wales		13	Grandchild	—N/a
3		Princess Charlotte of Wales		11	Grandchild	—N/a
4		Prince Louis of Wales		8	Grandchild	—N/a
5		Prince Harry, Duke of Sussex		41	Son	Meghan Markle
6		Prince Archie of Sussex		7	Grandchild	—N/a
7		Princess Lilibet of Sussex		5	Grandchild	—N/a
Descendants of Elizabeth II
9		Princess Beatrice, Mrs Edoardo Mapelli Mozzi		38	Grandchild	Edoardo Mapelli Mozzi
12		Princess Eugenie, Mrs Jack Brooksbank		36	Grandchild	Jack Brooksbank
16		Prince Edward, Duke of Edinburgh		62	Son	Sophie Rhys-Jones
17		James Mountbatten-Windsor, Earl of Wessex (Note: Although James is a British prince, his parents chose for him not to be styled 'prince' in order for him to avoid some of the burdens of royal titles.)		18	Grandchild	—N/a
18		Lady Louise Mountbatten-Windsor (Note: Although Louise is a British princess, her parents chose for her not to be styled 'princess' in order for her to avoid some of the burdens of royal titles.)		22	Grandchild	—N/a
19		Anne, Princess Royal		76	Daughter	Sir Timothy Laurence
Descendants of George V
33		Prince Richard, Duke of Gloucester		82	Grandchild	Birgitte van Deurs Henriksen
43		Prince Edward, Duke of Kent		90	Grandchild	Katharine Worsley (died 2025)
54		Prince Michael of Kent		84	Grandchild	Baroness Marie-Christine von Reibnitz
59		Princess Alexandra, The Honourable Lady Ogilvy		89	Grandchild	Sir Angus Ogilvy (died 2004)

== By marriage ==
Women become princesses by marriage, but only use that title if their husband is the Prince of Wales (e.g. Catherine, Princess of Wales) or if they take their husband's full name (last done by Princess Michael of Kent in 1978). Most women use a peerage derived from their husband, such as Duchess or Countess. Men cannot become princes by marriage.

Year of marriage	Image	Name	Arms	Age	Spouse
1972		Birgitte, Duchess of Gloucester		80	Prince Richard, Duke of Gloucester
1978		Princess Michael of Kent		81	Prince Michael of Kent
1999		Sophie, Duchess of Edinburgh		61	Prince Edward, Duke of Edinburgh
2011		Catherine, Princess of Wales		44	William, Prince of Wales
2018		Meghan, Duchess of Sussex		45	Prince Harry, Duke of Sussex

== See also ==
- House of Windsor
- List of British monarchs
- List of peerages created for British princes
- Family tree of the British royal family
- Prince of Waterloo
