= Papua New Guinea Independence Medal =

- Type: Independence Medal
- Awarded for: service in Papua New Guinea at and prior to independence
- Presented by: Papua New Guinea
- Eligibility: Civilian, military and police personnel
- Established: 1975
- Ribbon of medal

Precedence
- Next (higher): Commendation Medal for Valuable Service
- Next (lower): Community Service Medal

The Papua New Guinea Independence Medal was created in 1975 to commemorate the transition from self-government to the full independence of Papua New Guinea. It is a part of the Papua New Guinea honours system.

== Criteria ==
The Government of Papua New Guinea awarded the Papua New Guinea Independence Medal to members of the Papua New Guinea Defence Force, who had served between 1 December 1973 and 16 September 1975. Civilian recipients were honoured for outstanding service during the same period of time. Military personnel and civilians from Commonwealth realms such as Australia and the New Zealand were also awarded the medal.

== Precedence ==
Country	Preceding	Following
(Australia) Australia; Australian Honours Order of Precedence	Anniversary of National Service 1951–1972 Medal	Foreign Awards; Worn in order of date of award
New Zealand; New Zealand Honours Order of Precedence	Rhodesia Medal	Service Medal of the Order of St John
(United Kingdom) United Kingdom; Order of precedence	Fiji Independence Medal	Solomon Islands Independence Medal

== Notable recipients ==
- Bill Bradfield
- Kevin Byrne
- Yash Ghai
- Michael Jeffery
- Jim Molan
- Michael Somare
- Marilyn Strathern
- John Lavett
