= Richard, Duke of Gloucester =

Richard, Duke of Gloucester may refer to:

- Prince Richard, Duke of Gloucester (born 1944)
- Richard III of England (1483–1485), Duke of Gloucester prior to his accession to the throne
