= St George's School, Ascot =

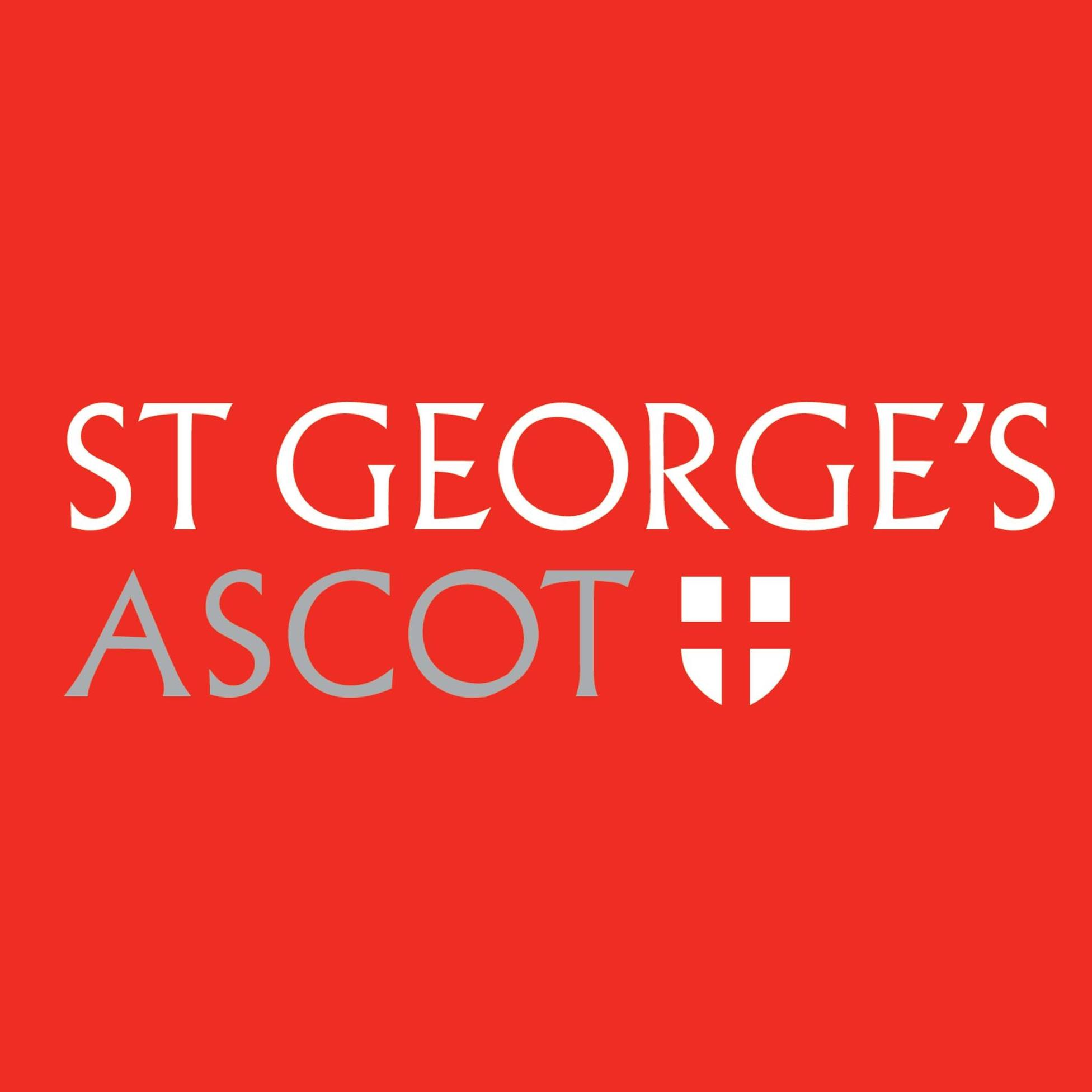

Location
- Ascot, Berkshire, SL5 7DZ; England; 51.4083°N 0.6666°W

Information
- Type: Private day and boarding
- Motto: Vincent Qui Se Vincunt; They will conquer who overcome themselves
- Religious affiliation: Church of England
- Established: 1877; 149 years ago
- Local authority: Windsor and Maidenhead
- Head: Hannah Fox
- Staff: 49
- Gender: Girls
- Age: 11 to 18
- Enrolment: 250
- Colour: Red
- Former pupils: Old Georgians
- Website: http://www.stgeorges-ascot.org.uk/

St George's School, Ascot is an independent girls' boarding and day school in Ascot, Berkshire, England. It was founded as a boys' school but later became a girls' school.

== History ==
The school was founded in 1877 as a boys' preparatory school. Among its former pupils was the British war-time Prime Minister Winston Churchill and the german earl Harry Kessler. In 1904, it became a finishing school for girls, opened by Miss Pakenham-Walsh. In 1923, Miss Anne Loveday took over the school. In 1927, the school was recognised by the Department of Education. In 1932, the swimming pool was built, and in 1943, the sports facilities were extended with tennis courts and games field. From 1939 to 1945, the school functioned during the war and air raid shelters were made to give protection.

== Facilities ==
St George's, Ascot is located off the High Street in Ascot, Berkshire. The school is close to Windsor Great Park and opposite the Ascot Racecourse.

== Boarding ==
Around a quarter of the girls are boarders. They are grouped by years and housed in three dormitories: Markham, Knatchbull and Loveday.

== Notable former pupils ==
- Princess Beatrice of York
- Lady Davina Lewis, older daughter of Prince Richard, Duke of Gloucester
- Lady Rose Gilman, younger daughter of Prince Richard
- Susanna de Vries
- Vivienne de Watteville
- Manpreet Bambra, actress
- Hélène (Elaine) Vagliano, Légion d'Honneur, Chevalier; Croix de Guerre avec Palme; Medaille de la Résistance
- Rebecca Gethings
- Victoria Smurfit
- Kimberley Garner, television personality and swimwear designer

Former boys' school;

- Sir Winston Churchill, Prime Minister
- Niall Campbell, 10th Duke of Argyll
- Claud Schuster, 1st Baron Schuster
- Harry Graf Kessler
