= Birgitte, Duchess of Gloucester =

Member of the British royal family (born 1946)

Birgitte
- Duchess of Gloucester (more)
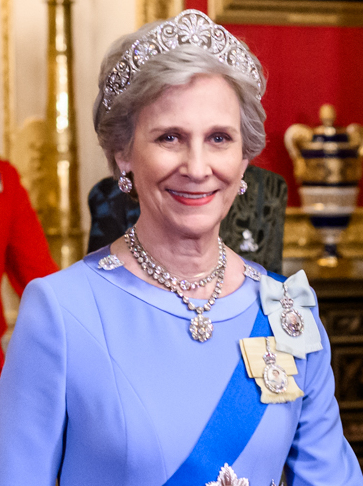
- Birgitte in 2025
- Born: Birgitte Eva van Deurs Henriksen; 20 June 1946 (age 80); Odense, Denmark
- Spouse: Prince Richard, Duke of Gloucester (m. 1972)
- Issue: Alexander Windsor, Earl of Ulster; Lady Davina Windsor; Lady Rose Gilman
- House: Windsor (by marriage)
- Father: Asger Henriksen
- Mother: Vivian van Deurs

Birgitte, Duchess of Gloucester (born Birgitte Eva van Deurs Henriksen; 20 June 1946) is a Danish-born member of the British royal family. She is married to Prince Richard, Duke of Gloucester, a grandson of King George V.

== Early life and education ==
Birgitte Eva van Deurs Henriksen was born on 20 June 1946 in Odense, Denmark, the younger daughter of lawyer Asger Preben Wissing Henriksen and his wife, Vivian van Deurs. She was educated in Odense and later attended finishing schools in Lausanne and Cambridge. She took her mother's ancestral name, van Deurs, on 15 January 1966 following her parents' separation. After completing a three-year course in Commercial and Economic Studies in Copenhagen, she moved to the United Kingdom in 1971 to work as a secretary at the Royal Danish Embassy in London.

== Marriage and family ==
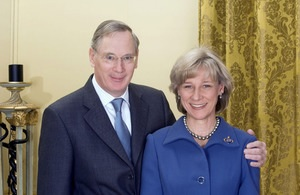
Birgitte and Richard

Birgitte first met Prince Richard of Gloucester, the younger son of Prince Henry, Duke of Gloucester, and Alice, Duchess of Gloucester, in the late 1960s in Cambridge, while she was attending finishing school and he was studying architecture. Their engagement was announced in February 1972. They married on 8 July 1972 at St Andrew's Church, Barnwell, Northamptonshire.

Her wedding dress, designed by Norman Hartnell, was made of Swiss organdie with a high collar, long sleeves, a simple skirt and a small train. Instead of a tiara, she wore stephanotis flowers securing her veil. Upon marriage, she assumed the style Her Royal Highness Princess Richard of Gloucester.

Six weeks after the wedding, Richard's elder brother, Prince William of Gloucester, was killed in a flying accident. Richard became heir apparent to the dukedom, and on his father's death in 1974 the couple became the Duke and Duchess of Gloucester.

They have three children: Alexander (born 1974), Davina (born 1977), and Rose (born 1980), all born at St Mary's Hospital, London. Birgitte and Richard reside at Kensington Palace. They had leased their private home, Barnwell Manor, since 1994. In September 2022, Richard put the manor up for sale for £4.75 million and it was sold in April 2024.

== Activities ==
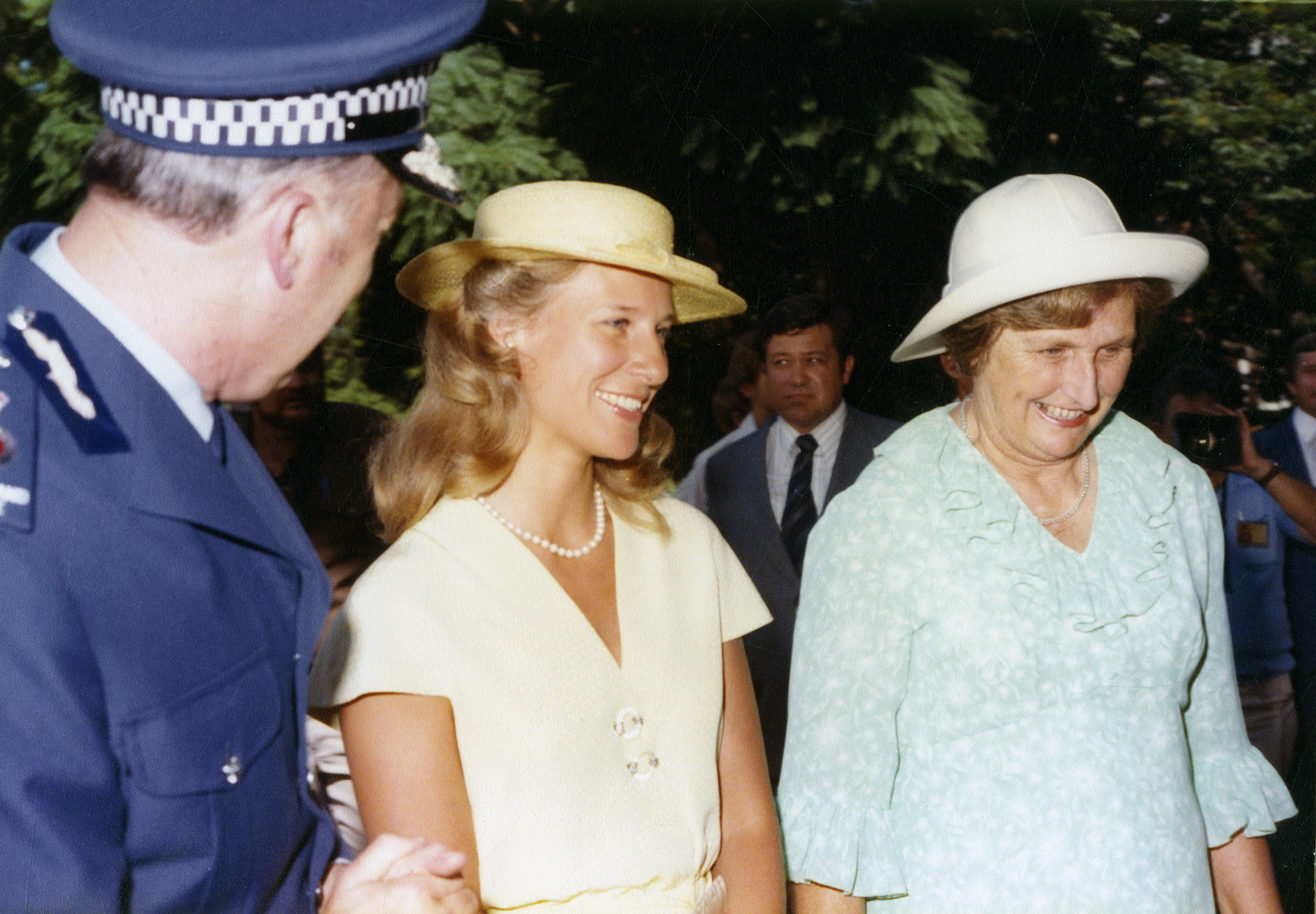
Birgitte in Brisbane, 1979

Birgitte has accompanied Richard on numerous official overseas visits. Her first was in 1973, when they represented the Queen at the 70th birthday celebrations of King Olav V of Norway. Other joint visits have included Australia, Belgium, China, Denmark, Gibraltar, Hong Kong, Israel, Japan, Luxembourg, Nepal, New Zealand, Norway, the Philippines, Portugal, Saudi Arabia, Singapore, Solomon Islands, South Africa, Spain, Sweden, Tonga, Tunisia and the United States. She has also travelled abroad in support of her own patronages and military affiliations, including a visit to Iraq in December 2008.

She and her husband represented the Queen and the Duke of Edinburgh at the state funeral of King Tāufaʻāhau Tupou IV of Tonga on 19 September 2006, and at the coronation of King George Tupou V of Tonga on 1 August 2008 in Nukuʻalofa.

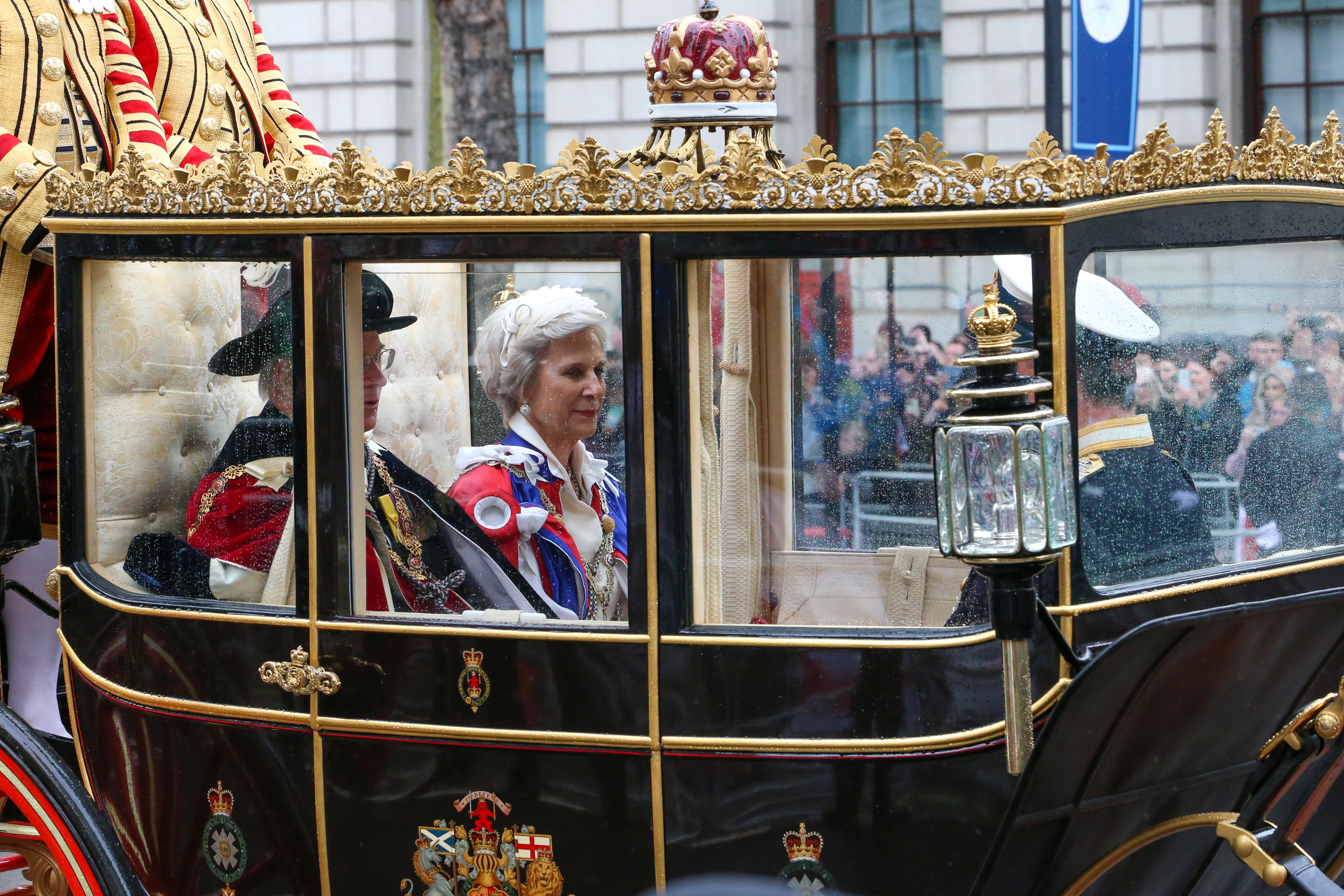
Birgitte and Richard riding in the Scottish State Coach with Vice Admiral Sir Timothy Laurence following the coronation on 6 May 2023

Birgitte is sponsor of two Royal Navy ships, HMS Gloucester and HMS Sandown, and is royal patron of the Bermuda Regiment. She is patron of SeeAbility; The Lullaby Trust; and Music in Hospitals & Care. She regularly attends events at institutions of which she is president or patron, including St Paul's Cathedral School; the Friends of St Paul's Cathedral; the Cathedral Music Trust; St John's School, Leatherhead; Bridewell Royal Hospital (King Edward's School, Witley); the Royal Alexandra and Albert School; the Children's Society; Parkinson's UK; Hope for Youth Northern Ireland; Scottish Opera; Lawn Tennis Association; the Royal School of Needlework; Turn2us; Missing People; and Princess Helena College. After the death of Diana, Princess of Wales, she became president of the Royal Academy of Music. She is also patron of Prostate Cancer UK, and in March 2006, she opened the Prostate Centre.

== Honours and arms ==
=== Honours ===
Country	Date	Appointment	Ribbon	Post-nominal letters	Other
United Kingdom	1973	Recipient of the Royal Family Order of Elizabeth II			
United Kingdom	1975	Dame of Justice of the Order of St John		DStJ	
United Kingdom	1975	Recipient of the Service Medal of the Order of St John			
United Kingdom	1977	Recipient of the Queen Elizabeth II Silver Jubilee Medal			
United Kingdom	1978	Recipient of the Solomon Islands Independence Medal			
United Kingdom	1989	Dame Grand Cross of the Royal Victorian Order		GCVO	
United Kingdom	2002	Recipient of the Queen Elizabeth II Golden Jubilee Medal			
United Kingdom	2012	Recipient of the Queen Elizabeth II Diamond Jubilee Medal			
United Kingdom	2022	Recipient of the Queen Elizabeth II Platinum Jubilee Medal			
United Kingdom	2024	Royal Lady Companion of the Most Noble Order of the Garter		LG	
United Kingdom	2024	Recipient of the Royal Family Order of Charles III			
Tonga	1 August 2008	Grand Cross of the Royal Order of the Crown of Tonga			
Mexico	3 March 2015	Sash of the Mexican Order of the Aztec Eagle			

=== Honorary military appointments ===
Australia

- (Australia) Colonel-in-Chief, of the Royal Australian Army Educational Corps

Bermuda

- Colonel-in-Chief, of the Royal Bermuda Regiment (2006–present)

Canada

- (Canada) Colonel-in-Chief of the Royal Canadian Dental Corps (January 2006 – present)

New Zealand

- Colonel-in-Chief, of the Royal New Zealand Army Educational Corps

United Kingdom

- (United Kingdom) Colonel-in-Chief, of the Royal Army Dental Corps (until 2024 when the corps was amalgamated)
- (United Kingdom) Colonel-in-Chief, of the Adjutant General's Corps (2023–present; Deputy Colonel-in-Chief 1992–2023)
- (United Kingdom) Colonel-in-Chief, of the Royal Irish Rangers
- (United Kingdom) Deputy Colonel-in-Chief, of the Royal Army Medical Service (2024–present)
- (United Kingdom) Royal Colonel, of the 7th (V) Battalion The Rifles
- (United Kingdom) Lady Sponsor, of HMS Gloucester
- (United Kingdom) Lady Sponsor, of HMS Sandown

=== Non-national titles and honours ===
- 1991: Honorary Liveryman of the Worshipful Company of Basketmakers
- Honorary Freeman of the Worshipful Company of Drapers
- 2005: Liveryman of the Worshipful Company of Fan Makers
- Honorary Liveryman of the Worshipful Company of Gold and Silver Wyre Drawers
- Liveryman of the Worshipful Company of Vintners

=== Arms ===
Coat of arms of the Duchess of Gloucester
Notes The coat of arms of the Duchess of Gloucester, depicting her husband's armorial bearings surmounted by an escutcheon of pretence granted to her by Royal Warrant. Adopted 18 July 1973 Coronet Coronet of a grandchild of the sovereign. Escutcheon The Duke of Gloucester's arms and in the centre an escutcheon of pretence Azure a lapwing proper, on a chief Or two pairs of ostrich feathers in saltire Sable Supporters The Royal Supporters differenced with the like coronet and label. Orders The Garter circlet; motto: Honi soit qui mal y pense (Shame be to him who thinks evil of it). Banner Banner of her arms as Royal Lady Companion of the Garter depicted at St George's Chapel Previous versions The Duchess of Gloucester's previous arms featuring the circlet of the Royal Victorian Order (1989−2024)

== Issue ==
Name	Birth	Marriage		Children
Alexander Windsor, Earl of Ulster	24 October 1974	22 June 2002	Claire Booth	Xan Windsor, Lord Culloden; Lady Cosima Windsor
Lady Davina Windsor	19 November 1977	31 July 2004; Divorced 2018	Gary Lewis	Senna Lewis; Tāne Lewis
Lady Rose Gilman	1 March 1980	19 July 2008	George Gilman	Lyla Gilman; Rufus Gilman

Orders of precedence in the United Kingdom
Preceded by Zara Tindall	Ladies; HRH The Duchess of Gloucester	Succeeded by The Countess of Snowdon
