= Susanna de Vries =

Australian writer

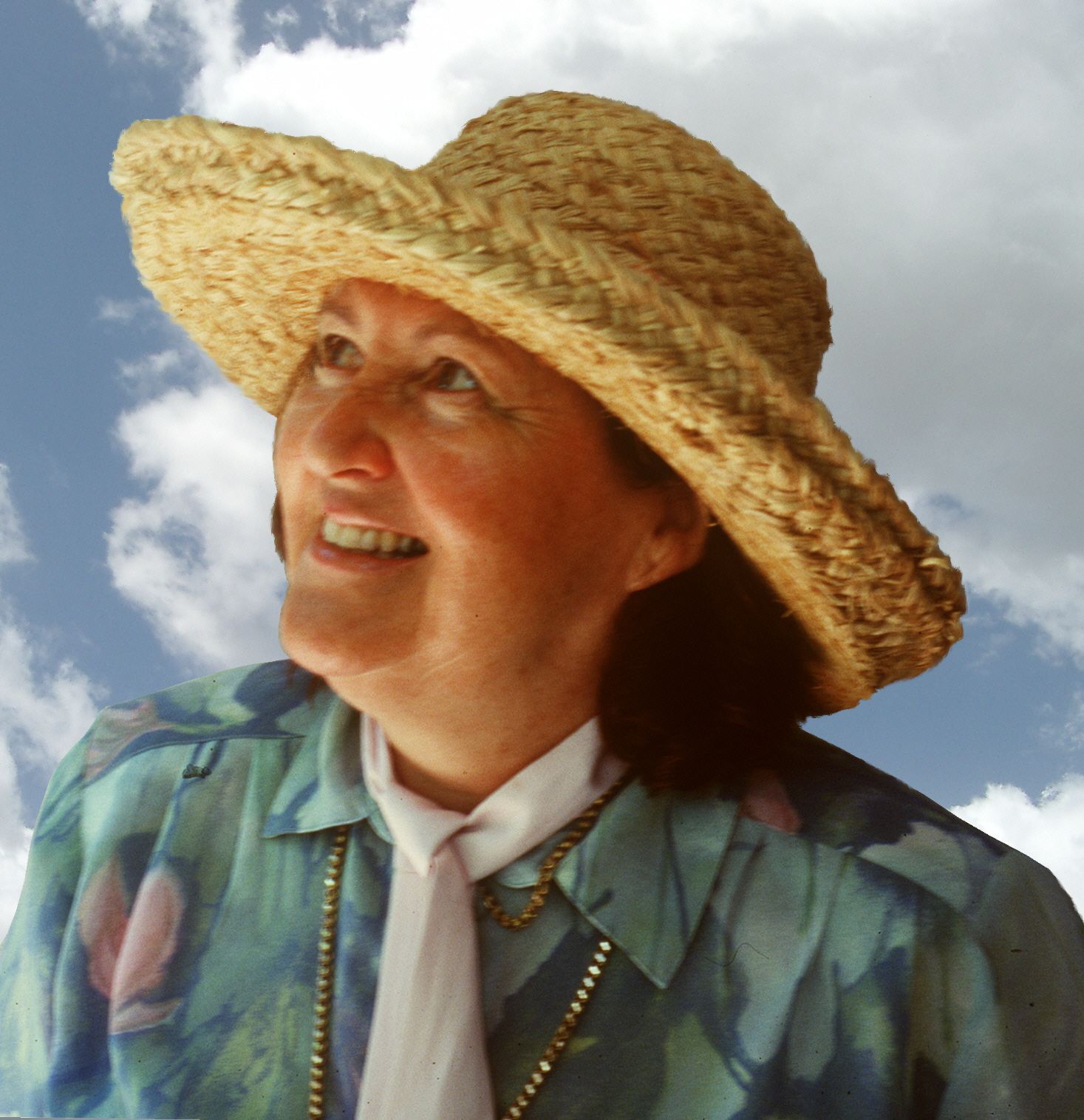
- Born: 6 October 1936 (age 90)
- Citizenship: Australian
- Education: University of Paris, Complutense University of Madrid
- Occupations: Writer, art historian, journalist, company director
- Spouse(s): Larry Evans (1962–1981), MB, ChB, FRANZCP. FRCPsych. DPM; Jake de Vries (1985-2015)
- Writing career
- Pen name: Susanna de Vries-Evans, Susanna Evans
- Years active: 1985 onwards
- Period: 1987–2014
- Genres: Bibliography, history, art
- Notable awards: Sir William Tyrone Guthrie Fellowship 2001, Order of Australia 1996, Winston Churchill Fellowship 1995
- Website: susannadevries.com

Susanna de Vries AM (born 6 October 1936) is an Australian historian, writer, and former academic. She has published more than twenty books, making her one of Queensland's most published authors. The majority of these detail the bravery and hardships experienced by Australian women during the war with female contributions to the arts and various pioneering women the other main subjects of her work. She has also published books on art history and art crime. De Vries was trained as an art historian. In 1996, she was made a Member of the Order of Australia for services to art and literature. She was born in England then moved to Australia in 1975.

== Early life and education ==
Susanna de Vries was born on 6 October 1936. De Vries grew up in England where she experienced the bombing of London in World War II. Her family home was destroyed forcing the family to live in a series of hotels. Lacking friends of her own age as a hotel child she turned to books and writing for comfort. She went to St George's School, Ascot, in Berkshire. At school, she was shown a film depicting German concentration camps which affected her deeply.

She studied history at the Sorbonne in Paris, France, graduating with a Course de Civilisation Francaise. At the Complutense University of Madrid in Spain de Vries obtaining a Degree in Art History. De Vries moved to Queensland in 1975 where shortly afterwards she began working for a library at the University of Queensland. In 1980, she moved to Sydney with her husband. De Vries gained a Diploma in Renaissance Studies from Instituto Lorenzo di Medici in Florence in 1995. She is fluent in Spanish and French.

== Career ==
In Australia de Vries was a freelance journalist. She edited The Australian Connoisseur and Collector magazine and has contributed to a number of journals related to art history. She was head of Rare Books and Antiquarian Prints for James R. Lawson Fine Art Auctioneers from 1979 to 1982. She was a lecturer in art history for the Queensland University of Technology Department of Architecture in Brisbane between 1991 and 1992. In 1992, de Vries resigned as a Commonwealth Valuer of Painting because of concerns with being sued for property devaluation after identifying art forgeries. Susanna had been an accredited Association of Australian Decorative and Fine Arts Societies (ADFAS)/National Association of Decorative & Fine Arts Societies lecturer and in this capacity has lectured on art and history to branches of ADFAS all over Australia.

In 1994, Susanna and her husband founded Pandanus Press. Pandanus Press was later renamed Pirgos Press.

== Other activities ==
As an adopted child out of Ireland, she went there to find her own story as well as that of Daisy Bates, an Irish amateur archaeologist in central Australia. She discovered her biological mother was a teacher in an Irish National School and her father a Reuters journalist and a writer who died reporting the Spanish Civil War.

In June 2015, de Vries hosted a ceremony at the Shrine of Remembrance in Brisbane to honour ANZAC nurses. She interviewed Elizabeth Taylor after her purchase of the Vue de l'Asile et de la Chapelle de Saint-Remy, a painting by Vincent van Gogh.

== Personal life ==
From 1962—1981, Susanna was married to Larry Evans, MB, ChB, FRANZCP. FRCPsych. DPM. In 1984, she met Jake de Vries at the Queensland Art Gallery. Jake and Susanna married on 18 July 1985 in Brisbane. In 2015, Jake died from bone marrow cancer. She currently resides in Brisbane and is writing her memoirs.

== Awards ==
In 1995, the Winston Churchill Fellowship was awarded de Vries to study Renaissance art in Italy. The following year she was made a Member of the Order of Australia for her services as an author and a lecturer in Australian and European art history and history. In 2001 she was awarded a Tyrone Guthrie Fellowship by the Literature Board of the Australia Council. On the 14 November 2012, the Society of Australian Women Writers presented Susanna with the Alice Award. She was also received the Sligo Non-Fiction prize and the Alice Award from the Society of Australian Women Authors in Sydney in 2012.

== Published works ==
External media

Audio
- Desert queen Daisy Bates

Video
- Royal Mistresses of the House of Hanover-Windsor

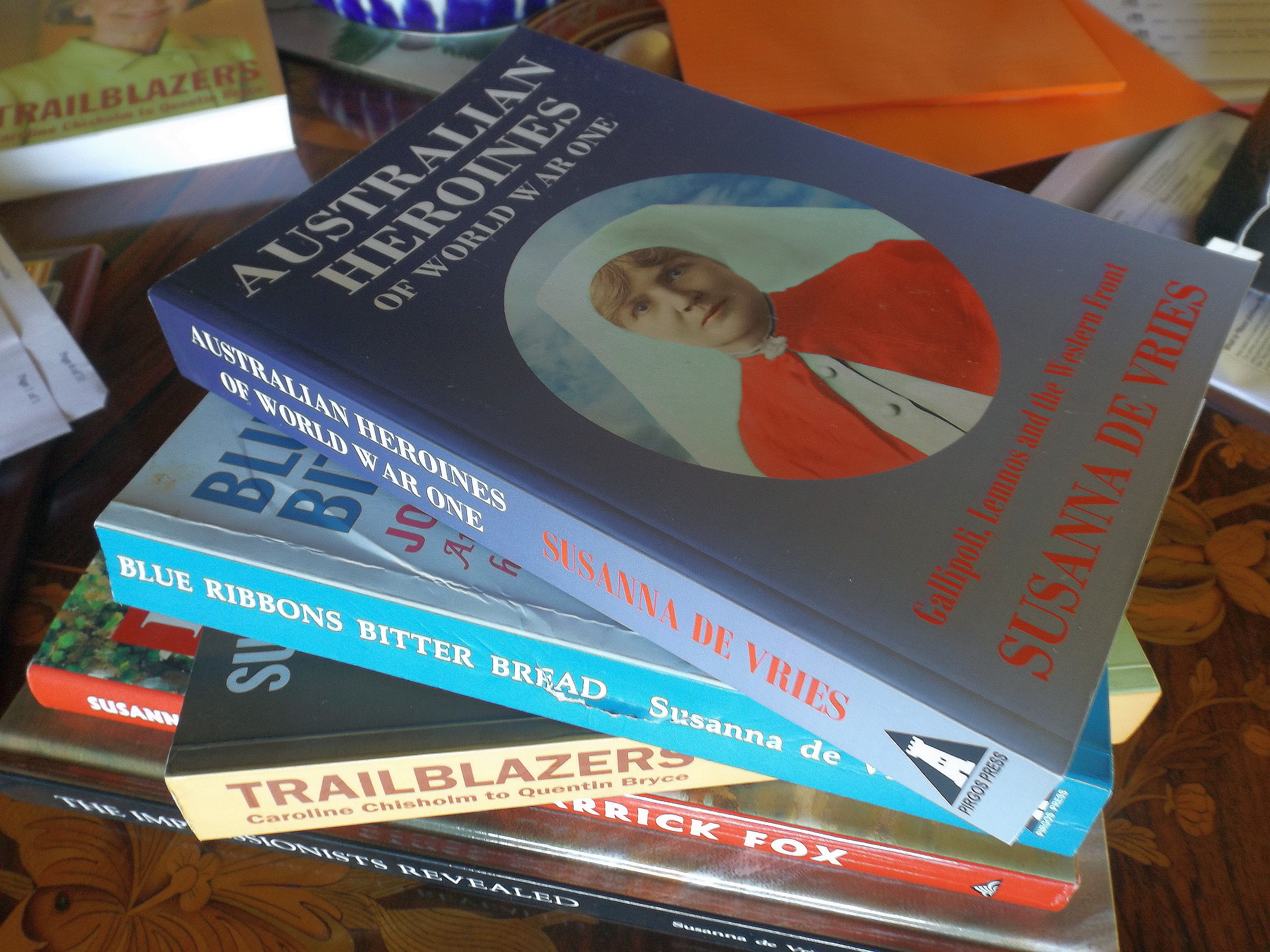
Some of her books

Susanna de Vries has published more than 20 titles. Her books are popular in schools and libraries. Some works were published under the name Susanna de Vries-Evans or Susanna Evans. Her writing style has been described as "deadpan mainstream". When researching for her books she draws the accounts from war records, contemporary newspaper accounts, family histories, and personal letters. Because her work covers some topics not extensively written about, the publishing of first editions can flush out people with more knowledge to contribute to revisions. Funding for Australian Heroines of World War One was provided by Dame Elisabeth Murdoch. Vries has attempted to expose the lives of women whose stories are not commonly known. These include the following:

- Historic Sydney as seen by its early artists. 1983 (Susanna Evans)
- Historic Brisbane and its early artists. 1985
- Pioneer Women Pioneer Land – Yesterday's Tall Poppies. 1987.
- The Impressionists Revealed: Masterpieces from Private Collections.
- Conrad Martens on the Beagle and in Australia. 1993. This title documents the life of Conrad Martens.
- Strength of spirit: pioneering women of achievement from first fleet to federation. 1995
- Ethel Carrick Fox: Travels and Triumphs of a Post-Impressionist. 1997
- Strength of purpose: Australian Women of Achievement from Federation to the Mid-20th Century'. 1998.
- Historic Sydney: the founding of Australia'. 1999.
- Blue Ribbons Bitter Bread, the Story of Joice Loch, Australia's Most Decorated Woman. 2000. This book tells the story of Joice NanKivell Loch
- Great Australian Women: From Federation to Freedom'. 2001.
- The Complete Book of Great Australian Women: 36 Women Who Have Changed the Course of Australia. 2003.
- Historic Brisbane: convict settlement to river city. 2003. This book was co-written with her husband Jake de Vries.
- Heroic Australian Women in War. 2004.
- Great Pioneer Women of the Outback. 2005.
- To Hell and Back. 2007.
- Desert Queen: The Many Lives and Loves of Daisy Bates. 2008. This is a revealing portrayal of Daisy Bates.
- Trailblazers and Females on the Fatal Shore. 2008.
- Females On The Fatal Shore. 2009
- The Complete Book of Heroic Australian Women: Twenty-one Extraordinary Women Whose Stories Changed History. 2010
- Trailblazers: Caroline Chisholm to Quentin Bryce. 2011.
- Royal Mistresses of the House of Hanover-Windsor. 2012.
- Australian Heroines of World War One: Gallipoli, Lemnos and the Western Front' . 2013.
- A Royal Love Triangle: Diana Remembered, Camilla Revealed. 2013
- Historic Sydney: The Founding of Australia. 2014.
- To the Ends of the Earth: Mary Gaunt, Pioneer Traveller: Her Biography. 2014
- Royal Marriages - Diana, Camilla, Kate and Meghan and Princesses Who Did Not Live Happily Ever After. 2018

== See also ==
- List of female authors
- Women in Australia
- Women in World War I
