= Scottish State Coach =

Horse-drawn carriage used by the British Royal Family

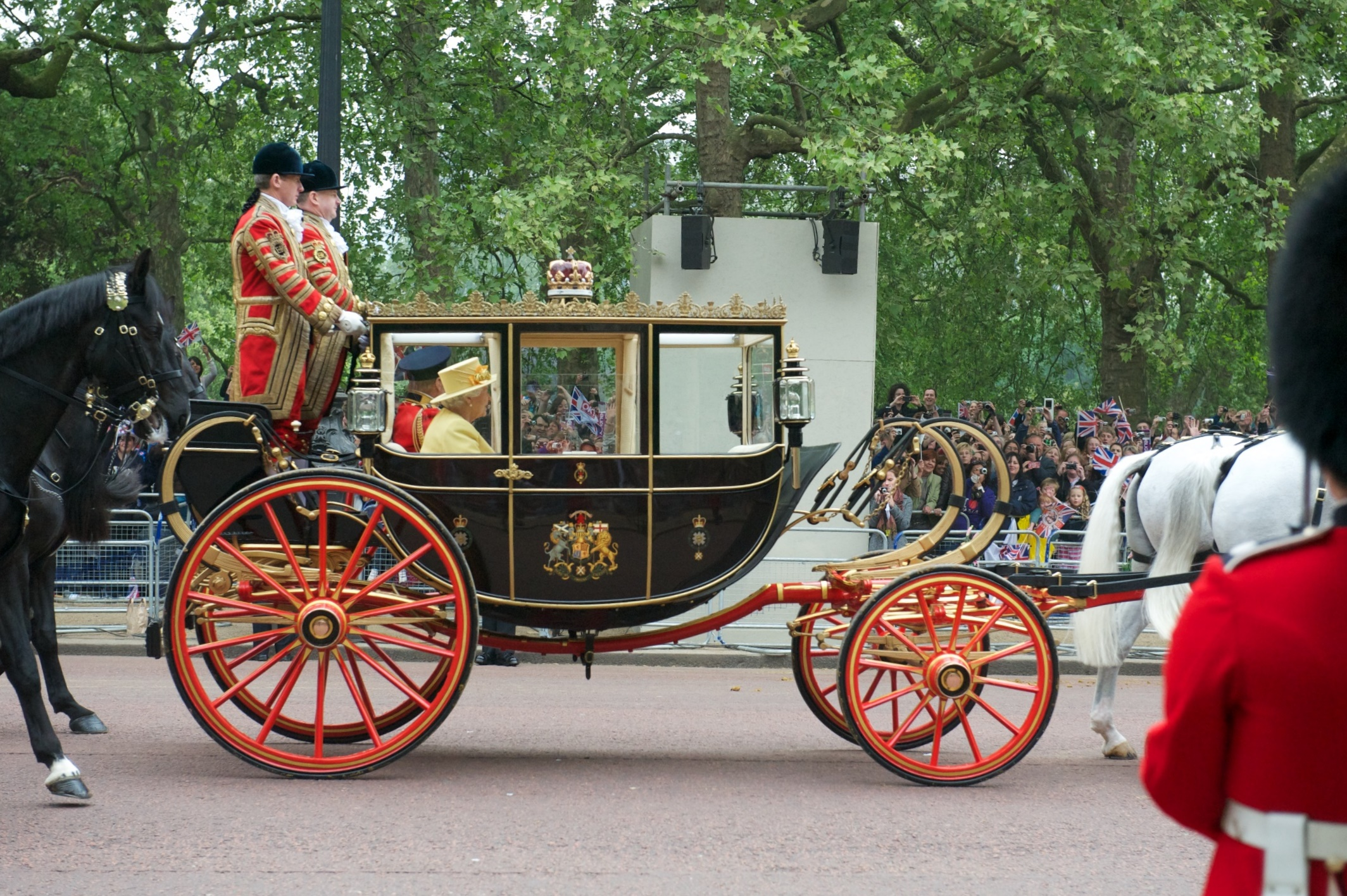
The Scottish State Coach, 2011

The Scottish State Coach is an enclosed, four-horse-drawn carriage used by the British royal family.

This state coach was built by Adams & Hooper in 1830 for Prince Adolphus, Duke of Cambridge to attend the coronation of William IV, and it was used for many years by the duke's family until it was sold to William Keppel, 7th Earl of Albemarle, who converted it into a semi-State landau. In 1920, the Keppel family returned the coach to the Royal Family by presenting it as a gift to Queen Mary, who kept it in the mews at Windsor Castle.

Between 1968 and 1969, the coach was extensively remodelled and restored to its original enclosed state. Large glass windows and transparent panels in the roof were added, the Royal Arms and the insignia of the Order of the Thistle were emblazoned onto it and a model of the Crown of Scotland was added on top of the roof. The bulk of the conversion work was done by St. Cuthbert's Co-operative Society of Edinburgh, to the designs of Glover, Webb & Liversidge of London.

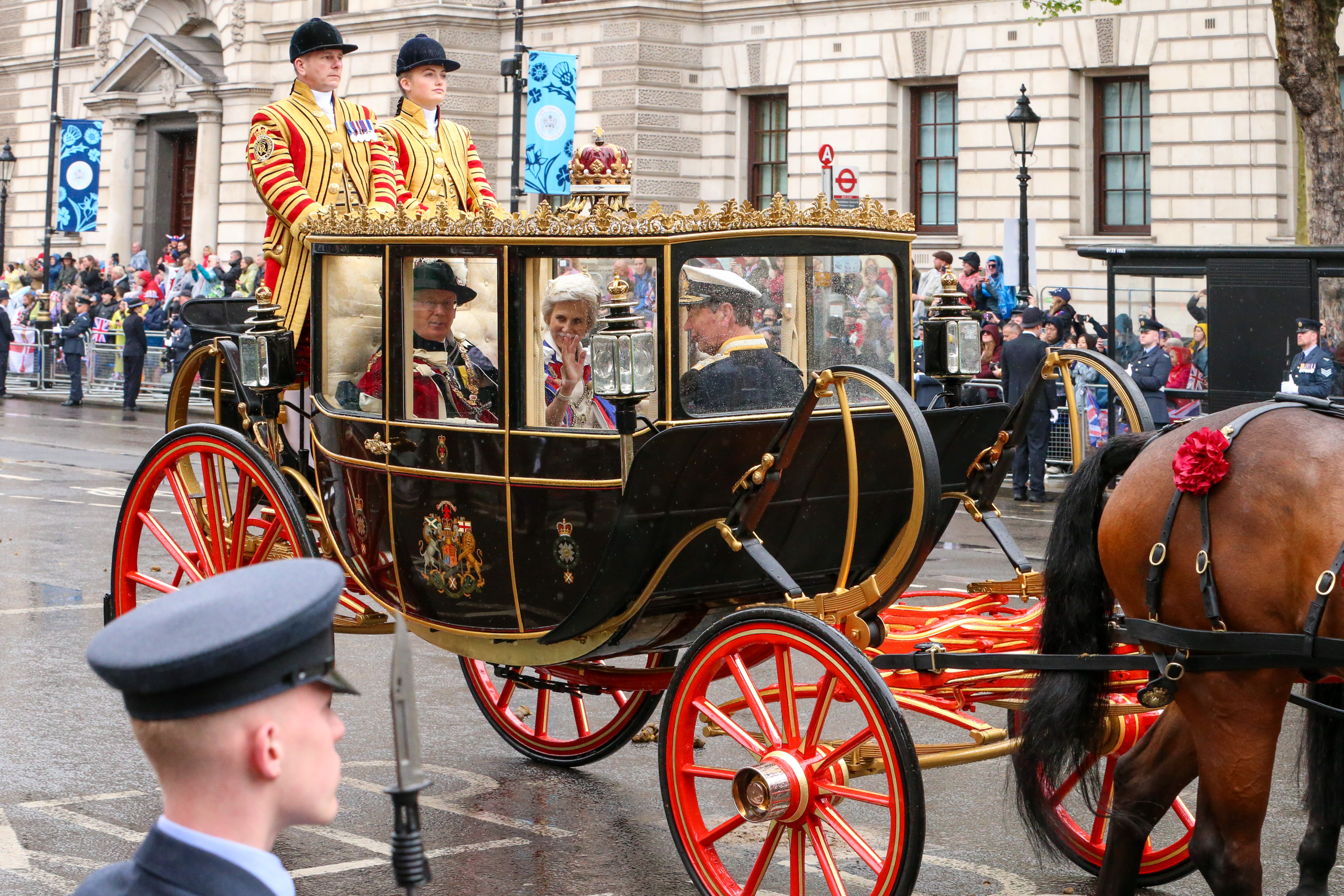
The coach being used at the Coronation of King Charles III and Queen Camilla on 6 May 2023

The coach was used for the first time by Queen Elizabeth II during the opening of the General Assembly of the Church of Scotland in 1969. It was used by Queen Elizabeth The Queen Mother in 1977 during the thanksgiving service for her daughter's Silver Jubilee, and also in 1979 during her installation as Lord Warden of the Cinque Ports at Dover. The Queen and the Duke of Edinburgh also used it at Windsor during the Queen's sixtieth birthday celebrations in 1986. The carriage was used for the Order of the Thistle service on at Edinburgh in 1994 and then as a reserve carriage for the state visit of Harald V and Queen Sonja of Norway at Holyrood the following day.

The carriage has been used at least three times for royal weddings: in 1963 to transport the bride and groom during the wedding of Princess Alexandra and Angus Ogilvy, in 2011 to chauffeur the Queen and the Duke of Edinburgh at the wedding of Prince William and Catherine Middleton, and in 2018 to transport the bride and groom during the wedding of Princess Eugenie and Jack Brooksbank.

The Queen rode in it to and from her Birthday Parade in 2019, the last time she took the salute on Horse Guards Parade in person. In 2023, it was used to drive the Duke and Duchess of Gloucester and Sir Timothy Laurence from Westminster Abbey to Buckingham Palace after the Coronation of King Charles III and Queen Camilla, and in 2024 on the King's Birthday Parade to transport King Charles III and Queen Camilla from Buckingham Palace to Horse Guards Parade for Trooping the Colour.

The coach is usually stored at the Royal Mews in London, where it can be seen by the public. From time to time, and for certain special events such as the Queen's Jubilee, the coach has been displayed in Scotland, at locations including Holyrood Palace.

== See also ==
- List of state coaches
- Royal Mews
