= Lady Rose Gilman =

British film art assistant (born 1980)

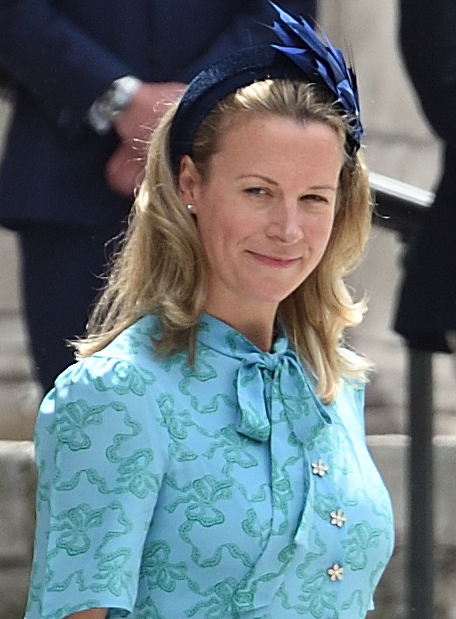
- Gilman in 2022
- Born: Rose Victoria Birgitte Louise Windsor; 1 March 1980 (age 46); London, England
- Spouse: George Gilman (m. 2008)
- Children: 2
- Parents: Prince Richard, Duke of Gloucester (father); Birgitte van Deurs Henriksen (mother)
- Relatives: House of Windsor

Lady Rose Victoria Birgitte Louise Gilman (née Windsor; born 1 March 1980) is a British film art assistant and member of the British royal family. She is the daughter of Prince Richard, Duke of Gloucester, and his wife Birgitte, Duchess of Gloucester. She is 40th in the line of succession to the British throne as of August 2026.

== Early life and education ==
Rose Victoria Birgitte Louise Windsor was born on 1 March 1980 at St Mary's Hospital, London, the youngest child of Prince Richard, Duke of Gloucester and Birgitte, Duchess of Gloucester. She was baptised on 13 July at Barnwell, Northamptonshire. Her godparents included Prince Edward and Lady Sarah Armstrong-Jones. She attended St George's School, Ascot and spent her childhood in Kensington Palace.

== Career ==
Rose has worked in the film industry as a film art assistant. Her film credits include Harry Potter and the Order of the Phoenix, Harry Potter and the Half-Blood Prince, Margaret Thatcher: The Long Walk to Finchley, and the television series Little Britain.

Rose continues to make public appearances at state events alongside other members of the extended royal family, including the 2022 state funeral of Queen Elizabeth II and the 2023 coronation of King Charles III and Queen Camilla.

== Marriage and children ==
Rose announced her engagement on 16 November 2007 to businessman George Gilman, the son of a former director of Leeds United. They married on 19 July 2008 at Queen's Chapel in London. For the occasion, she wore a tiara that belonged to her great-grandmother Queen Mary and a dress by Franka Couture. The couple also refused an offer by Hello! magazine to cover the event. Members of the royal family present at the wedding included the Princess Royal and the Earl and Countess of Wessex. Rose and her husband have a daughter, Lyla (born 30 May 2010, then 32nd in line of succession to the British throne), and a son, Rufus (born 30 October 2012, then 33rd in line of succession to the British throne).

Lady Rose Gilman Born: 1 March 1980
Lines of succession
Preceded by Tāne Lewis	Line of succession to the British throne granddaughter of Henry, son of George V	Succeeded by Lyla Gilman
