= Lady Davina Windsor =

Member of the British royal family (born 1977)

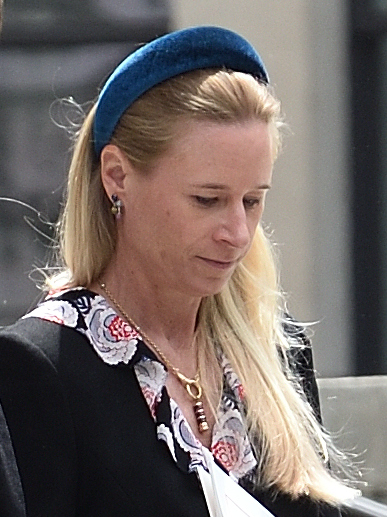
- Windsor in 2022
- Born: 19 November 1977 (age 48); St Mary's Hospital, London, England
- Education: University of the West of England
- Spouse: Gary Christie Lewis (m. 2004; div. 2018)
- Children: 2
- Parents: Prince Richard, Duke of Gloucester (father); Birgitte van Deurs Henriksen (mother)
- Family: House of Windsor

Lady Davina Elizabeth Alice Benedikte Windsor (born 19 November 1977) is a member of the British royal family, and is the elder daughter of the Duke and Duchess of Gloucester. She is 37th in the line of succession to the British throne as of January 2025. She was known as Lady Davina Lewis between 2004 and 2018, during her marriage to Gary Lewis.

== Early life and education ==
Davina Elizabeth Alice Benedikte Windsor was born on 19 November 1977 at St Mary's Hospital, London, the second child of Prince Richard, Duke of Gloucester and Birgitte, Duchess of Gloucester. She was baptised on 19 February 1978 at Barnwell Parish Church, close to the family home, Barnwell Manor in Northamptonshire. Her godparents are Captain Mark Phillips, the Duke of Buccleuch, Elisabeth, Lady Camoys, Susan Wigley, Roger Wellesley Smith and Caroline, Baroness Rosenørn-Lehn. Lady Davina grew up in Kensington Palace. She was educated at Kensington Preparatory School in Notting Hill, followed by St George's School, Ascot. She is a graduate of the University of the West of England, with a degree in media studies.

== Marriage and children ==
On 31 July 2004, Davina married Gary Christie Lewis (born 15 August 1970), a Māori. Lewis is a carpenter who runs a property renovation business and is a surfing enthusiast. The couple had known each other for four years, having met on holiday in Bali, but they kept their relationship secret for several years. Lewis is the son of Larry Lewis, a Māori builder who was runner-up in the Golden Shears sheep-shearing competition in 1982. His uncle is the prominent Māori author Witi Ihimaera who wrote The Whale Rider which became a film of the same name.

Lewis is also the first person of known Māori descent to marry a member of the royal family, or to marry the daughter of a British prince. As she is a legitimate descendant in the male line of George V and in line to the British throne, the Royal Marriages Act 1772 required that Royal Assent to the wedding be obtained in advance for the marriage to be legal and the descendants thereof to inherit rights of succession to the thrones of the Commonwealth realms, including that of New Zealand. On 20 July 2004, the Queen-in-Council formally declared her consent to the marriage. The wedding took place on 31 July 2004 at the private chapel of Kensington Palace, Davina's childhood home. Apart from the Duke and Duchess of Gloucester and the bride's siblings, no other members of the royal family were present at the wedding; only close friends and family were involved. The bride wore a satin gown with woven flowers in her hair. The couple divorced in 2018.

Davina and her former husband have a daughter, Senna Kowhai, who was born on 22 June 2010 and a son, Tāne Mahuta, who was born 25 May 2012. Her son was named after the Tāne Mahuta, a giant kauri tree in the Waipoua Forest of Northland Region, New Zealand. Davina was also stepmother to Lewis's son from a previous relationship, Ari (born 1992).

Until 26 March 2015, Tāne was ahead of Senna in the line of succession to the British throne since sons had priority over daughters based on tradition and common law. When the Succession to the Crown Act 2013 took effect in all Commonwealth realms in 2015, Senna became the nearest relative of the reigning monarch, Queen Elizabeth II, to be affected by the change in law, which advanced her proximity to the Crown by reversing her place in the order of succession with that of her younger brother. Senna and Tāne became 28th and 29th in line, respectively.

Davina does not carry out official functions but does attend family events including royal weddings. Davina and Gary Lewis were invited to attend the Queen's reception for members of the New Zealand All Blacks at Buckingham Palace in 2005. She and her then husband also attended Prince William's wedding in 2011.

Lady Davina Windsor Born: 19 November 1977
Lines of succession
Preceded by Lady Cosima Windsor	Line of succession to the British throne granddaughter of Prince Henry, Duke of Gloucester great-granddaughter of George V	Succeeded by Senna Lewis
