= Prince Richard, Duke of Gloucester =

British prince (born 1944)

Prince Richard
- Duke of Gloucester (more)
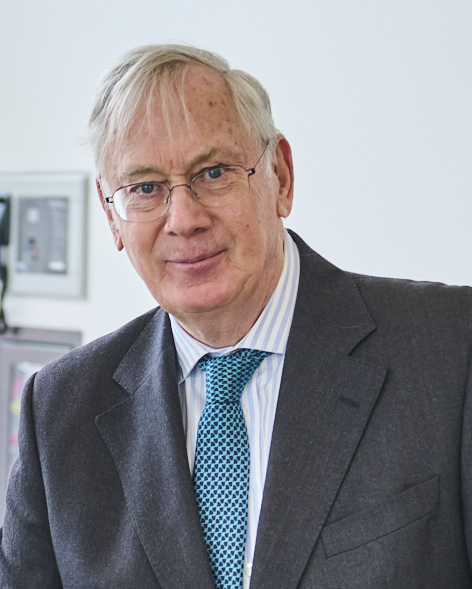
- Richard in 2023
- Born: Prince Richard of Gloucester; 26 August 1944 (age 82); St Matthew's Nursing Home, Northampton, England
- Spouse: Birgitte van Deurs Henriksen (m. 1972)
- Issue: Alexander Windsor, Earl of Ulster; Lady Davina Windsor; Lady Rose Gilman
Names
- Richard Alexander Walter George
- House: Windsor
- Father: Prince Henry, Duke of Gloucester
- Mother: Lady Alice Montagu Douglas Scott
- Education: Magdalene College, Cambridge

Member of the House of Lords Lord Temporal
- Hereditary peerage 23 October 1974 – 11 November 1999
- Preceded by: The 1st Duke of Gloucester
- Succeeded by: Seat abolished

Prince Richard, Duke of Gloucester (Richard Alexander Walter George; born 26 August 1944), is a member of the British royal family. He is the second son of Prince Henry, Duke of Gloucester, and Princess Alice, Duchess of Gloucester, the youngest of the nine grandchildren of George V, nephew of Edward VIII and George VI, first cousin of Elizabeth II, and first cousin once removed of Charles III. He is 33rd in the line of succession to the British throne, and the highest person on the list who is not a descendant of George VI. At the time of his birth, he was fifth in line to the throne.

Richard practised as an architect until the death of his elder brother, William, placed him in direct line to inherit his father's dukedom of Gloucester, to which he succeeded in 1974. He married Birgitte van Deurs Henriksen on 8 July 1972. They have three children.

== Early life ==
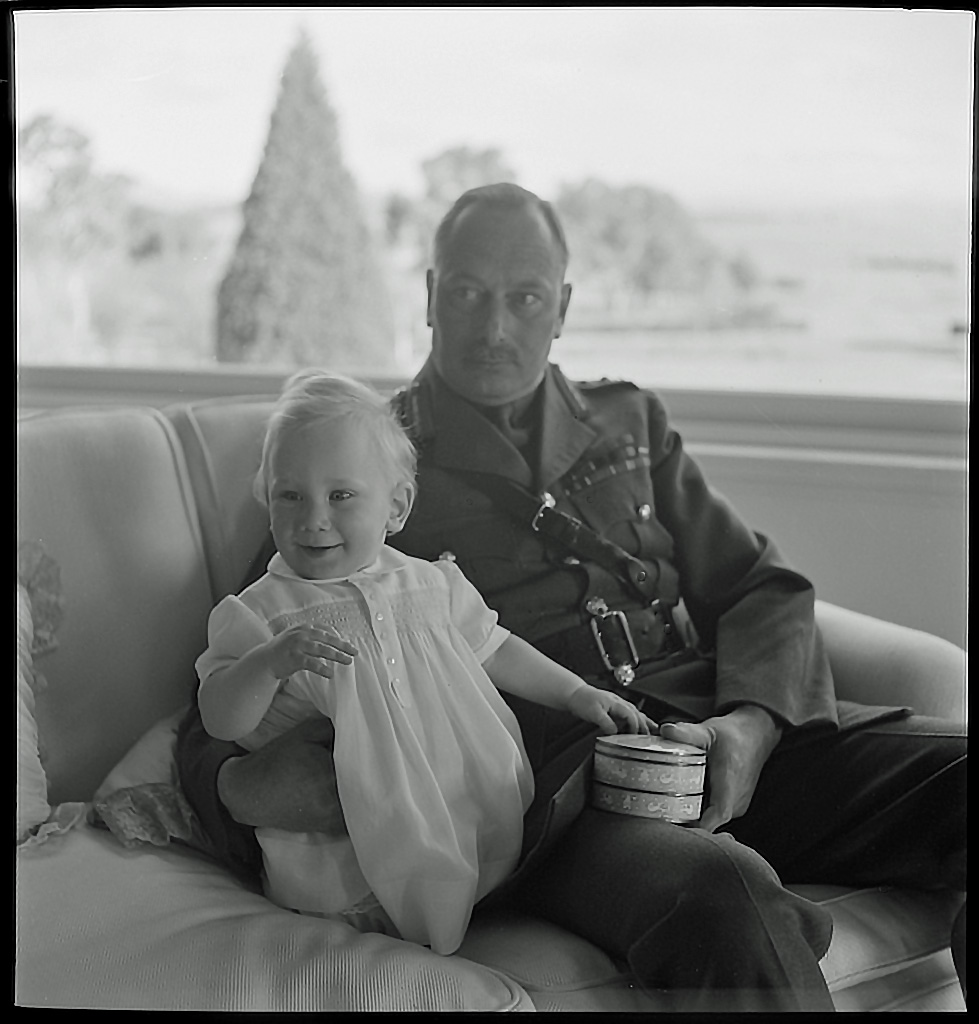
Richard with his father in 1945

Richard was born at 12:15 pm on 26 August 1944 at St Matthew's Nursing Home in Northampton, the second son of Prince Henry, Duke of Gloucester, and Alice, Duchess of Gloucester. His father was the third son of King George V and Queen Mary. His mother was the third daughter of John Montagu Douglas Scott, 7th Duke of Buccleuch, and Lady Margaret Bridgeman. At the time of his birth, he was second in line to his father's dukedom, behind his elder brother, Prince William of Gloucester, who died in an air crash in 1972 before inheriting the title and having any children of his own. At his birth the King suggested he be named Charles, with his parents preferring Richard, which was the name chosen.

Richard was baptised at the Royal Chapel of All Saints in Windsor Great Park on 20 October by the retired Archbishop of Canterbury, Cosmo Gordon Lang. His godparents were his paternal aunt Princess Mary, Queen Elizabeth, Princess Marie Louise (his first cousin twice removed), Princess Alice, Countess of Athlone (his grandaunt and first cousin twice removed, for whom her daughter, Lady May Abel Smith stood proxy), the Duke of Buccleuch (his maternal uncle), the Marquess of Cambridge (his cousin), Lady Sybil Phipps (his maternal aunt), and General the Earl Alexander of Tunis (for whom his wife, then Lady Margaret Alexander, stood proxy). Because of the War, newspapers did not identify the precise location of the christening, saying only that it took place at "a private chapel in the country". When Richard was four months old, he accompanied his parents to Australia, where his father served as governor-general from 1945 to 1947. The family returned to Barnwell Manor in 1947, where Richard spent most of his childhood.

== Education and career ==
Richard's early education took place at home, under the instruction of Rosalind Ramirez, who had also tutored young King Faisal II of Iraq; later, he attended Wellesley House School at Broadstairs and Eton College. In 1963, he matriculated at Magdalene College, Cambridge, where he studied architecture, graduating with the degree of Bachelor of Arts in June 1966. As is customary at Cambridge, this proceeded to MA (Cantab) in 1971.

In 1966, Richard joined the Offices Development Group in the Ministry of Public Building and Works for a year of practical work. He returned to Cambridge in 1967, completing both parts of the Diploma in Architecture degree in June 1969. Upon passing his exams, he became a practising partner with Hunt Thompson Associates, Architects, in London.

== Marriage and family ==
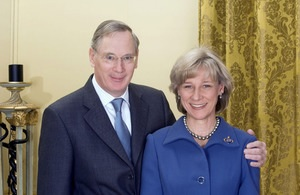
Richard and Birgitte

On 8 July 1972, Richard married Danish-born Birgitte van Deurs Henriksen at St Andrew's Church, Barnwell, Northamptonshire; they have three children:

- Alexander Patrick Gregers Richard Windsor, Earl of Ulster (born 24 October 1974 at St Mary's Hospital, London)
- Lady Davina Elizabeth Alice Benedikte Windsor (born 19 November 1977 at St Mary's Hospital, London)
- Lady Rose Victoria Birgitte Louise Gilman (born 1 March 1980 at St Mary's Hospital, London)

Richard and Birgitte's official residence is at Kensington Palace in London. They had leased their private home, Barnwell Manor, since 1994. In September 2022, Richard put the manor up for sale for £4.75 million and it was sold in April 2024.

== Activities ==
Richard ended his architectural career in 1972, after the death of his elder brother Prince William, who was killed in an air crash during a flying competition. Richard became heir apparent to his father's dukedom and had to take on additional family obligations and royal duties on behalf of the Queen. He became Duke of Gloucester on his father's death on 10 June 1974.

He has been a corporate member of the Royal Institute of British Architects since 1972. Richard is president of the Society of Architect Artists, an honorary fellow of the Institution of Structural Engineers, and was a trustee of the British Museum, deputy chairman of the Historic Buildings and Monuments Commission for England and a commissioner of English Heritage between 1998 and 2001. He has been patron of construction charity Construction Youth Trust for many years. With his background in architecture, Richard takes interest in the work of the trust and visits their projects, in addition to giving his name to their long standing Duke of Gloucester Young Achiever's Scheme Awards. He is patron of the Architects Benevolent Society. He is vice president of Lepra, a UK-based leprosy charity; as part of this role, he attends national and international events in support of the charity's work. Richard is royal patron of the Society of Antiquaries of London (and elected FSA) since 2001, royal patron of the UK branch of the charity Habitat for Humanity, royal patron of the St George's Society of New York, and president of The London Society. A keen motorist, he passed the Advanced Driving Test of the Institute of Advanced Motorists, of which he was president for more than 32 years. On his appointment in 1971, it was recorded that the new president was "currently [driving] an Austin 1300", reflecting the modest image with which he has always been identified. He stood down as president in January 2005.

Richard, accompanied by the Duchess, represented his cousin Elizabeth II at the Seychelles independence ceremonies on 26 June 1976 and again at the Solomon Islands independence celebrations on 7 July 1978. He served as a judge in Prince Edward's charity television special The Grand Knockout Tournament on 15 June 1987.

On 10 April 2008, Richard was officially installed as inaugural Chancellor of the University of Worcester during a ceremony at Worcester Cathedral. In this role, he officiates at degree ceremonies and major events, as well as promoting the university overseas. He carried out the first of these duties on 5 and 6 November 2008 at the Graduation Award Ceremonies. Richard is a patron of the Severn Valley Railway and the Pestalozzi International Village Trust. He is patron of the British Homeopathic Association. He shares a name with an earlier Duke of Gloucester, Richard III, and has been patron of the Richard III Society since 1980. He is a member of the international advisory board of the Royal United Services Institute.

During 2009, Richard became patron of the de Havilland Aircraft Heritage Centre in support of its bid to raise funds through private means and through a bid for Heritage Lottery Funding. Other patronages include: British Society of Soil Science, the International Council on Monuments and Sites, Action on Smoking and Health, British Association of Friends of Museums, British Mexican Society, St Bartholomew's Hospital, as well as numerous other organisations and charities. In July 2011, he visited the Isle of Man to meet with the representative of Manx National Heritage and the Council of Cancer Charities. On 8 November 2011, he opened the new Law School Building at the University of Hertfordshire on the de Havilland campus site of the former de Havilland Aircraft factory. On 19 March 2013, Richard represented Elizabeth II at the Vatican for the inauguration of Pope Francis.

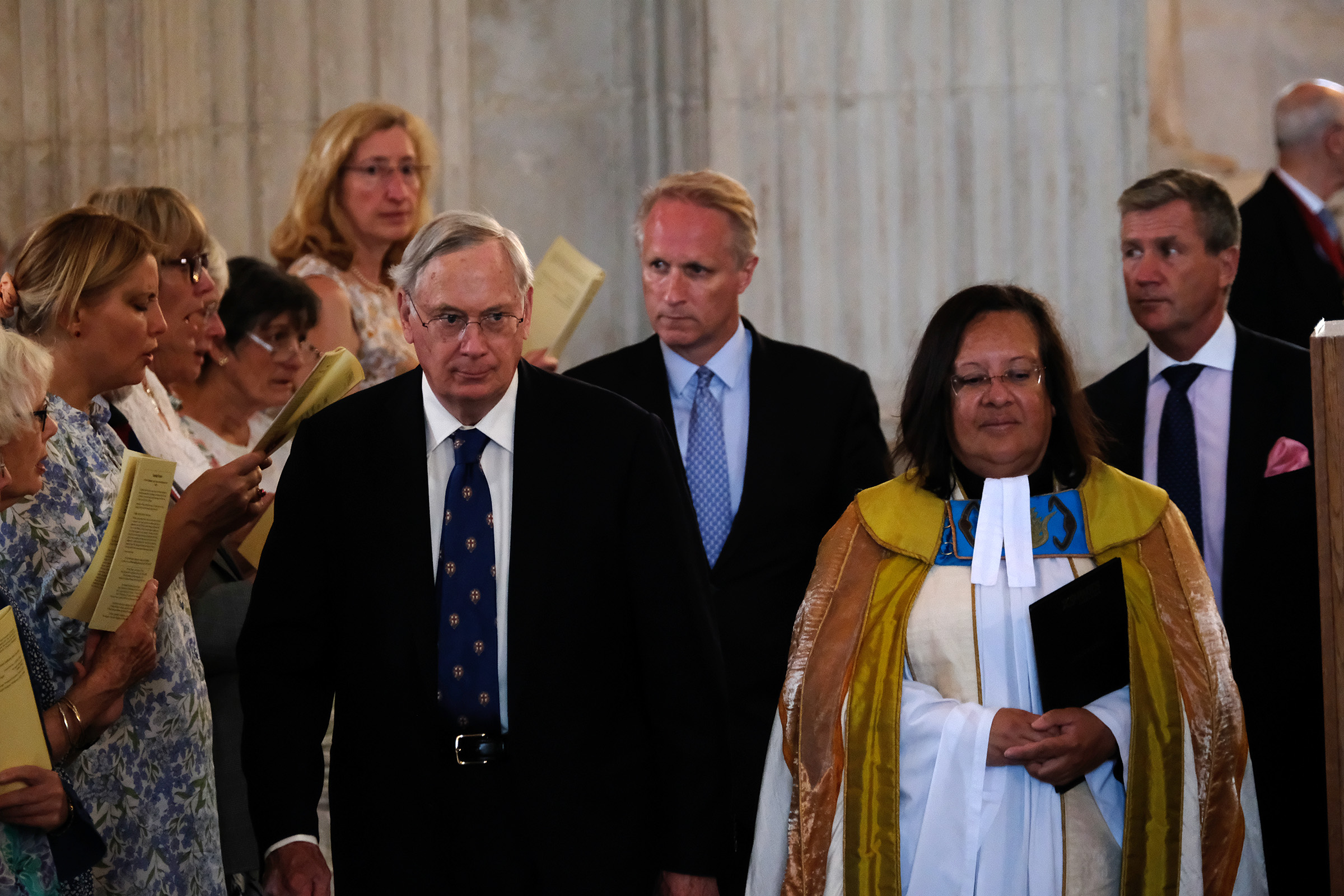
Richard in 2018 visiting the National Churches Trust

On 11 March 2015, Richard visited the Royal School Dungannon in County Tyrone to celebrate the 400th anniversary of the founding of the school; presenting a commemorative plaque and raising an anniversary flag on the grounds. On 22 and 26 March 2015, he represented the Queen at the ceremonies marking the reburial and commemorations of King Richard III in Leicester Cathedral. Richard III had held the title Duke of Gloucester before his ascension to the English throne. In March 2018, Richard travelled to Malawi to attend the Commonwealth Day celebrations, and visited projects related to health services, wildlife, and climate change. He missed the celebrations in March 2022 after testing positive for COVID-19.

On 14 September 2022, after the death of Queen Elizabeth II on 8 September, Richard joined her children, grandsons, nephew, and son-in-law, in walking in the state cortege from Buckingham Palace to Westminster Hall, for her lying in state.

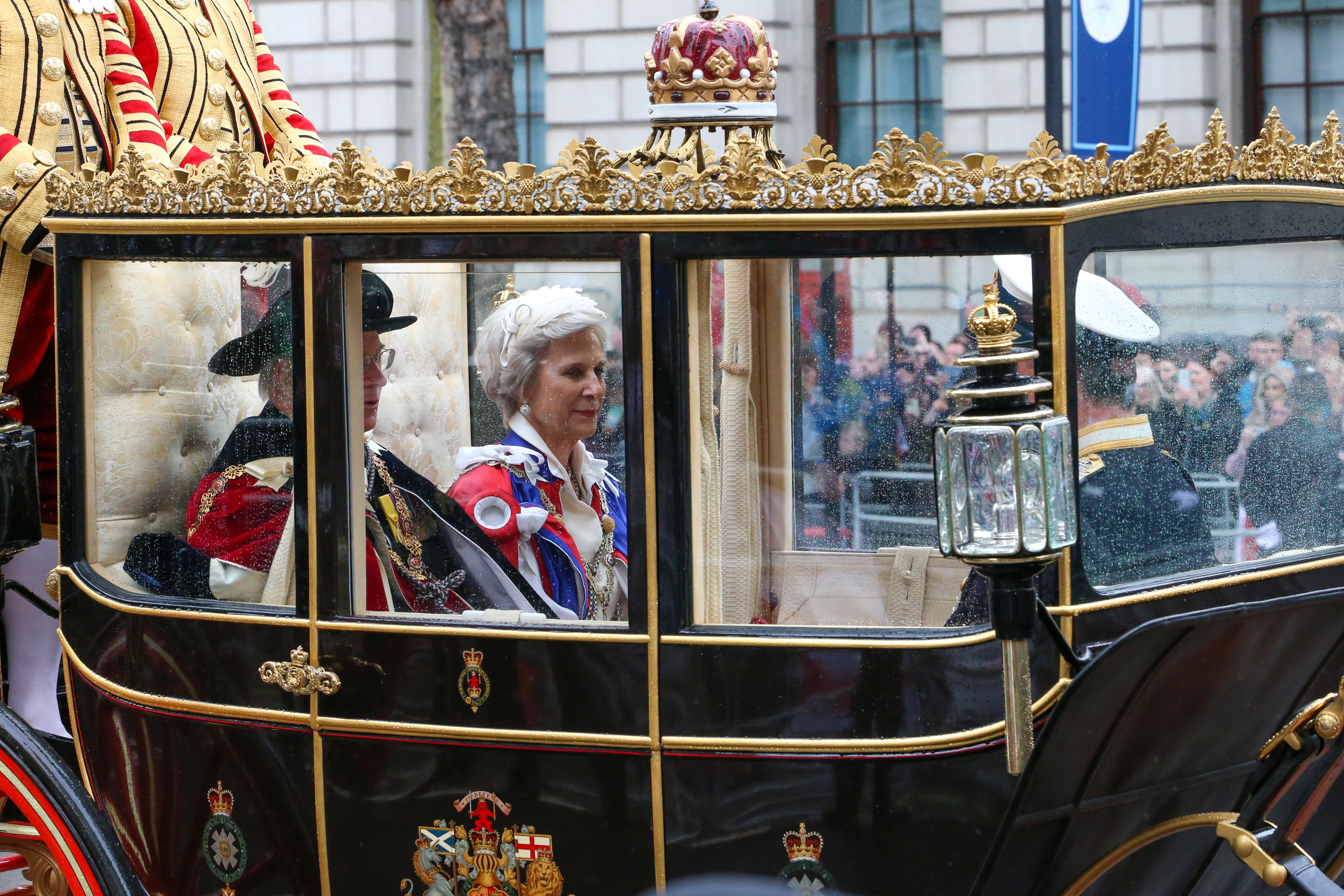
Richard and Birgitte riding in the Scottish State Coach with Vice-Admiral Sir Timothy Laurence following the coronation on 6 May 2023

In 2023 Richard and Birgitte attended the coronation of King Charles III and Queen Camilla in Westminster Abbey, and (in common with other working members of the royal family) took part in the Coronation Procession following the service.

== Titles, styles, honours and arms ==
=== Titles and styles ===
Richard was originally styled "His Royal Highness Prince Richard of Gloucester". Since becoming duke in 1974, he has been known as "His Royal Highness The Duke of Gloucester".

=== Honours ===
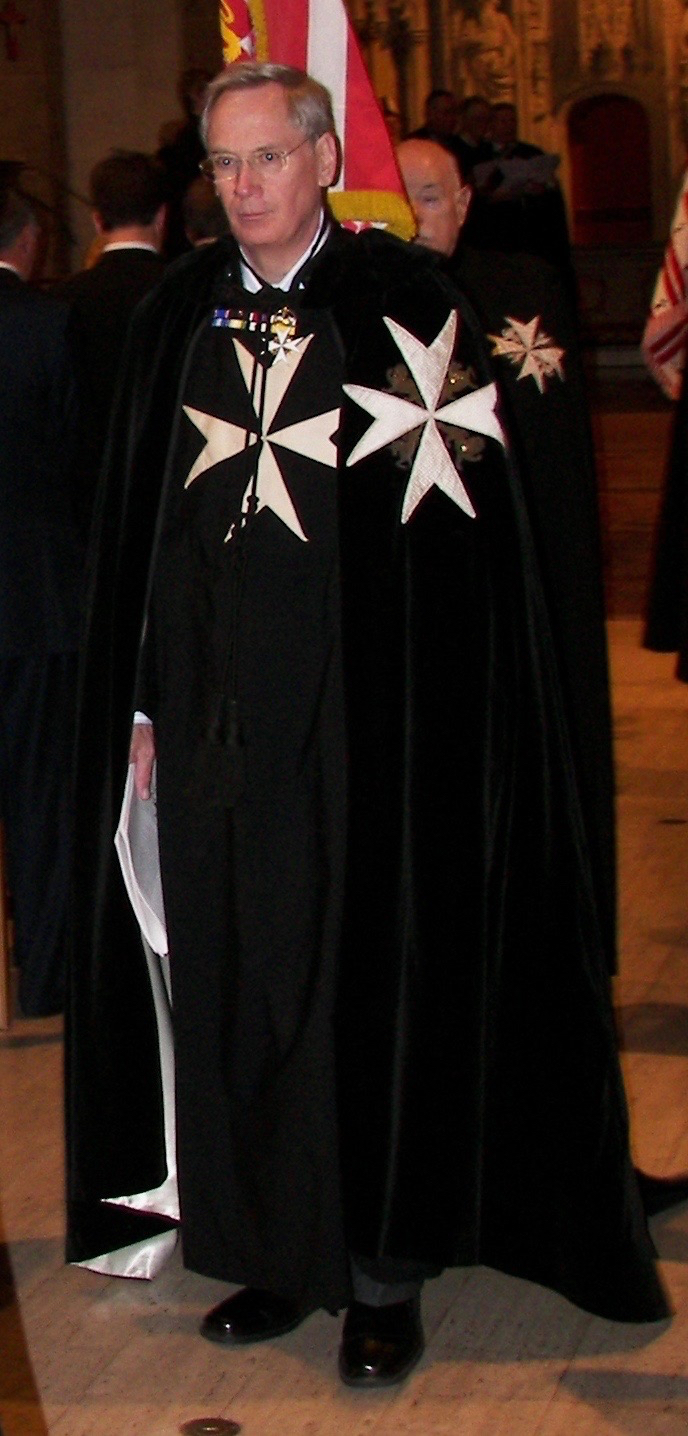
Robed in the mantle of Grand Prior of the Order of St John, 2006

Country	Date	Appointment	Ribbon	Post-nominal letters	Other
Commonwealth	2 June 1953	Recipient of the Queen Elizabeth II Coronation Medal			
Commonwealth	1 January 1974	Knight Grand Cross of the Royal Victorian Order		GCVO	
Commonwealth	6 February 1975	Grand Prior and Bailiff Grand Cross of the Order of St John		GCStJ	
Commonwealth	6 February 1977	Recipient of the Queen Elizabeth II Silver Jubilee Medal			
Commonwealth	7 July 1978	Recipient of the Solomon Islands Independence Medal			
Commonwealth	30 July 1980	Recipient of the Vanuatu Independence Medal			
Commonwealth	1980	Recipient of the Badge of Honour, New Hebrides			
Commonwealth	1984	Recipient of the Service Medal of the Order of St John			(with 5th bar (2 gold bars))
Commonwealth	1997	Royal Knight Companion of the Most Noble Order of the Garter		KG	
Commonwealth	6 February 2002	Recipient of the Queen Elizabeth II Golden Jubilee Medal			
Commonwealth	4 August 2008	Recipient of the Star of the Solomon Islands		SSI	
Commonwealth	6 February 2012	Recipient of the Queen Elizabeth II Diamond Jubilee Medal			
Commonwealth	6 February 2022	Recipient of the Queen Elizabeth II Platinum Jubilee Medal			
Commonwealth	6 May 2023	Recipient of the King Charles III Coronation Medal			
Norway	1973	Knight Grand Cross of the Royal Norwegian Order of St Olav			
Mexico	1973	Sash of the Mexican Order of the Aztec Eagle			
Mexico	9 September 2015	Sash of Special Category of the Mexican Order of the Aztec Eagle			
Sweden	1975	Commander Grand Cross of the Royal Order of the Polar Star			
Nepal	1975	Member, 1st Class of the Most Illustrious Order of Tri Shakti Patta			
Nepal	24 February 1975	Recipient of the Nepalese Coronation Medal			
Tonga	1 August 2008	Knight Grand Cross with Collar of the Royal Order of the Crown of Tonga			

==== Wear of orders, decorations, and medals ====
The ribbons worn regularly by Richard in undress uniform are as follows:

==== Honorary military appointments ====
Australia

- (Australia) Colonel-in-Chief, of the Royal Australian Army Education Corps

New Zealand

- Colonel-in-Chief of the Royal New Zealand Army Medical Corps

United Kingdom

- (United Kingdom) Colonel-in-Chief, of the Royal Anglian Regiment
- (United Kingdom) Colonel-in-Chief, of the Royal Army Medical Service
- (United Kingdom) Deputy Colonel-in-Chief, of the Royal Logistic Corps
- (United Kingdom) Royal Colonel, of the 6th (V) Battalion, The Rifles
- (United Kingdom) Royal Honorary Colonel, of the Royal Monmouthshire Royal Engineers (Militia)
- (United Kingdom) Colonel-in-Chief, of the Royal Army Medical Corps (until 15 November 2024 when the corps was amalgamated)
- (United Kingdom) Honorary Air Commodore in Chief, of the Royal Auxiliary Air Force
- (United Kingdom) Honorary Air Commodore, of RAF Odiham
- (United Kingdom) Honorary Air Commodore, of 501 (County of Gloucester) Squadron, Royal Auxiliary Air Force, 16 June 2001
- (United Kingdom) Honorary Air Marshal, Royal Air Force, 1 September 1996

==== Non-national titles and honours ====
===== Scholastic =====
- 2008–present: Chancellor of the University of Worcester

===== Civic =====
- Honorary Liveryman of the Worshipful Company of Basketmakers
- Honorary Liveryman of the Worshipful Company of Goldsmiths
- Honorary Freeman of the Worshipful Company of Grocers
- Liveryman of the Worshipful Company of Masons
- Patron of the Worshipful Company of Pattenmakers
- Honorary Liveryman of the Worshipful Company of Vintners

=== Arms ===
Coat of arms of the Duke of Gloucester
Notes The Duke's armorial bearings are based on the Royal Arms as set down for descendants of George V. The following explains how his arms are differenced from those of the Sovereign and other members of the Royal Family. Adopted 1962 Coronet Coronet of a male-line grandchild of the Sovereign. Crest On a Coronet of children of other sons of the Sovereign, composed of four Crosses pattées alternated with four Strawberry Leaves, a Lion statant guardant Or, crowned with the like Coronet, and differenced with a Label as in the Arms. Supporters The Royal Supporters, differenced with a Coronet as in the Crest and Label as in the Arms. Orders The Shield is surrounded by the Garter circlet, inscribed with its Motto: HONI SOIT QUI MAL Y PENSE (Shame be to him who thinks evil of it) Other elements Differences from the Royal Arms are a Label of five Points Argent, the centre and two outer Points charged with a Cross Gules, and the inner Points with a Lion passant guardant also Gules. As Grand Prior, like other Bailiffs Grand Cross of the Most Venerable Order of St John of Jerusalem, he is entitled to augment the Arms of the Order in chief. Banner The Duke's standard (or banner) displays his personal arms, granted in 1962. (in Scotland) Symbolism As in the Royal Arms of the United Kingdom, the first and fourth quarters represent England, the second Scotland and the third Ireland.

== Issue ==
Name	Birth	Marriage		Children
Alexander Windsor, Earl of Ulster	24 October 1974	22 June 2002	Claire Booth	Xan Windsor, Lord Culloden; Lady Cosima Windsor
Lady Davina Windsor	19 November 1977	31 July 2004; Divorced 2018	Gary Lewis	Senna Lewis; Tāne Lewis
Lady Rose Gilman	1 March 1980	19 July 2008	George Gilman	Lyla Gilman; Rufus Gilman

== See also ==
- British prince
- List of current British princes and princesses

Prince Richard, Duke of Gloucester House of Windsor Born: 26 August 1944
Lines of succession
Preceded by Arthur Chatto	Line of succession to the British throne son of Prince Henry, Duke of Gloucester grandson of George V	Followed by Earl of Ulster
Peerage of the United Kingdom
Preceded by The Prince Henry	Duke of Gloucester; 5th creation 10 June 1974 – present	Incumbent; Heir apparent: Alexander Windsor, Earl of Ulster
Orders of precedence in the United Kingdom
Preceded by Peter Phillips	Gentlemen; HRH The Duke of Gloucester	Followed by The Duke of Kent
Academic offices
New title	Chancellor of the University of Worcester; 2008–present	Incumbent
