= House of Windsor =

British royal family

- Royal house
- Heraldic badge of the house, featuring the Round Tower of Windsor Castle
- Parent house: Saxe-Coburg and Gotha (Note: George V changed the name of the royal house from Saxe-Coburg and Gotha to Windsor in 1917. The children and male-line descendants of Elizabeth II and Prince Philip genealogically belong to the House of Glücksburg, a cadet branch of the House of Oldenburg. The House of Saxe-Coburg and Gotha is itself a cadet branch of the House of Wettin.)
- Country: United Kingdom and other Commonwealth realms
- Founded: 17 July 1917; 109 years ago
- Founder: George V
- Current head: Charles III
- Members: See list

The House of Windsor is the current royal house of the United Kingdom and other Commonwealth realms. The house's name was inspired by the historic Windsor Castle. The house was founded in 1917, when King George V changed the name of the royal house from the German Saxe-Coburg and Gotha to the English Windsor due to anti-German sentiment during the First World War. There have been five British monarchs of the House of Windsor: George V, Edward VIII, George VI, Elizabeth II, and Charles III. The children and male-line descendants of Queen Elizabeth II and Prince Philip, Duke of Edinburgh, also genealogically belong to the House of Oldenburg since Philip was by birth a member of the Glücksburg branch of that house.

The monarch is head of state of fifteen sovereign states. These are the United Kingdom, Antigua and Barbuda, Australia, The Bahamas, Belize, Canada, Grenada, Jamaica, New Zealand, Papua New Guinea, Saint Kitts and Nevis, Saint Lucia, Saint Vincent and the Grenadines, Solomon Islands and Tuvalu. As well as these separate monarchies, there are also three Crown Dependencies, fourteen British Overseas Territories and two associated states and one dependent territory of New Zealand.

== History ==
In 1701, succession to the throne was given to Sophia of Hanover, who was born into the House of Wittelsbach, married into the House of Hanover, and was a granddaughter of James VI and I of the House of Stuart. Succession was passed to her son who became George I in 1714, marking the start of a long ruling period by the Hanoverian royal house. Eventually in 1901, a line of the House of Saxe-Coburg and Gotha succeeded the House of Hanover to the British monarchy with the accession of King Edward VII, son of Queen Victoria and Prince Albert of Saxe-Coburg and Gotha. In 1917, the name of the British royal house was changed from the German Saxe-Coburg and Gotha to the English Windsor, taking its name from the royal residence in Berkshire.

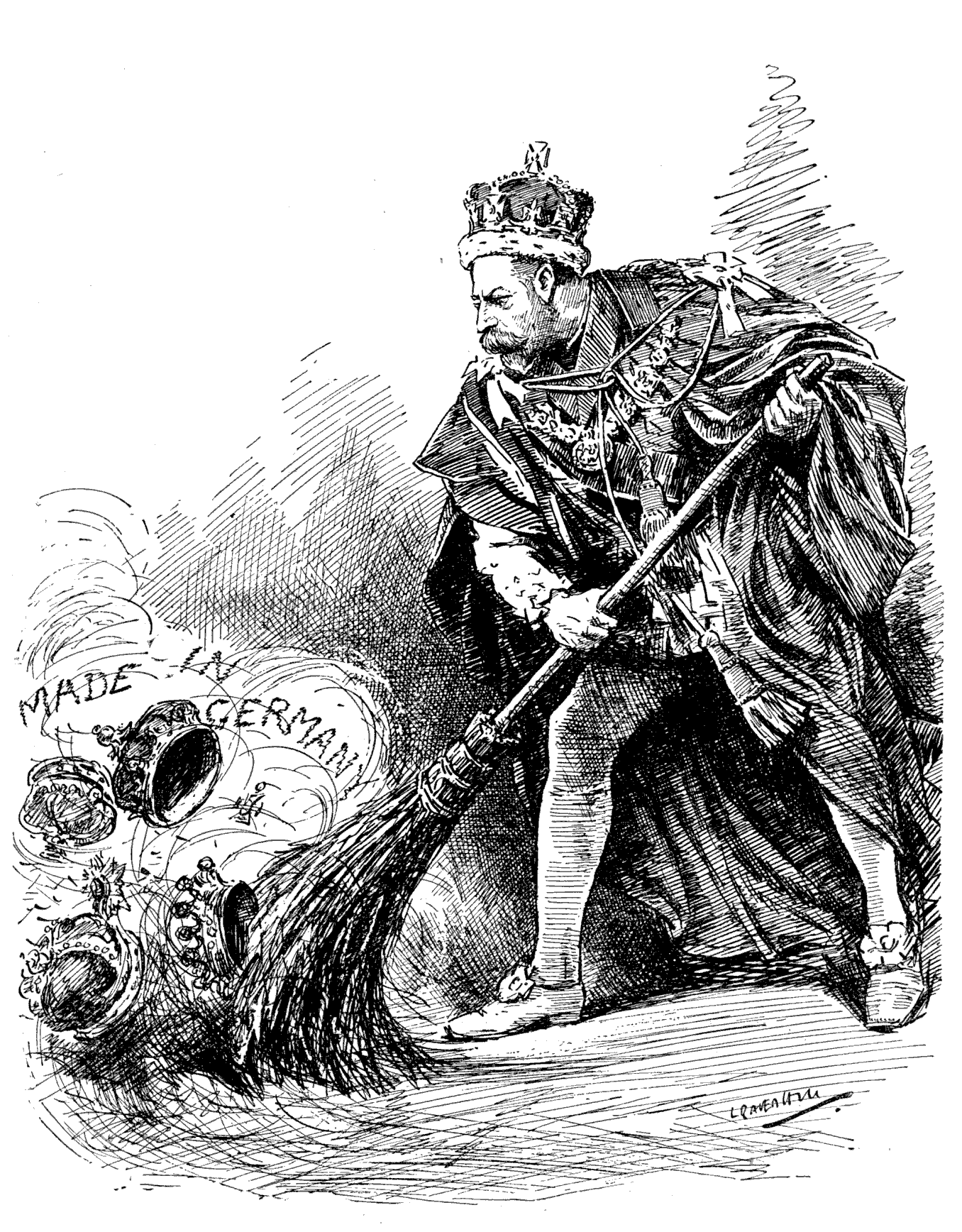
"A Good Riddance"; cartoon from Punch, Vol. 152, 27 June 1917, commenting on the King's order to relinquish all German titles held by members of his family

King Edward VII and, in turn, his son, George V, were members of the Saxe-Coburg and Gotha branch of the House of Wettin by virtue of their descent from Albert, Prince Consort, husband of Queen Victoria, the last British monarch from the House of Hanover. High anti-German sentiment amongst the people of the British Empire during the First World War reached a peak in March 1917, when the Gotha G.IV, a heavy aircraft capable of crossing the English Channel, began bombing London directly and became a household name. In the same year, on 15 March, King George's first cousin Emperor Nicholas II of Russia was forced to abdicate, which raised the spectre of the eventual abolition of all the monarchies in Europe. The King and his family were finally persuaded to abandon all titles held under the German Crown and to change German titles and house names to anglicised versions. Hence, on 17 July 1917, a royal proclamation issued by George V declared:

Now, therefore, We, out of Our Royal Will and Authority, do hereby declare and announce that as from the date of this Our Royal Proclamation Our House and Family shall be styled and known as the House and Family of Windsor, and that all the descendants in the male line of Our said Grandmother Queen Victoria who are subjects of these Realms, other than female descendants who may marry or may have married, shall bear the said Name of Windsor....

The name had a long association with monarchy in Britain, through the town of Windsor, Berkshire, and Windsor Castle. It was suggested by Arthur Bigge, 1st Baron Stamfordham. Upon hearing that his cousin had changed the name of the British royal house to Windsor and in reference to Shakespeare's The Merry Wives of Windsor, German Emperor Wilhelm II remarked jokingly that he planned to see "The Merry Wives of Saxe-Coburg-Gotha".

George V also restricted the use of British princely titles to his nearest relations, and in 1919, he stripped three of his German relations of their British titles and styles under the Titles Deprivation Act 1917.

The children and male-line descendants of Queen Elizabeth II and Prince Philip also genealogically belong to the House of Oldenburg since Philip was by birth a member of the Glücksburg branch of that house.

== List of monarchs ==
Portrait	Name	Birth	Reign	Coronation	Consort	Death	Claim
	George V	3 June 1865; Marlborough House	6 May 1910 – 20 January 1936 (25 years, 259 days)	22 June 1911	Mary of Teck	20 January 1936; Sandringham House (aged 70 years, 231 days)	Son of Edward VII and Alexandra of Denmark
	Edward VIII	23 June 1894; White Lodge, Richmond Park	20 January 1936 – 11 December 1936 (326 days)	Cancelled	None	28 May 1972; 4 Route du Champ d'Entraînement (aged 77 years, 340 days)	Sons of George V and Mary of Teck
	George VI	14 December 1895; York Cottage	11 December 1936 – 6 February 1952 (15 years, 57 days)	12 May 1937	Elizabeth Bowes-Lyon	6 February 1952; Sandringham House (aged 56 years, 54 days)	Sons of George V and Mary of Teck
	Elizabeth II	21 April 1926; 17 Bruton Street, Mayfair	6 February 1952 – 8 September 2022 (70 years, 214 days)	2 June 1953	Philip of Greece and Denmark	8 September 2022; Balmoral Castle (aged 96 years, 140 days)	Daughter of George VI and Elizabeth Bowes-Lyon
	Charles III	14 November 1948; Buckingham Palace	8 September 2022 – present (4 years, 70 days)	6 May 2023	Camilla Shand (since 2005) (Note: Prior to ascending the throne in 2022, Charles was married to Diana Spencer from 1981 to 1996.)	Living (age 78 years, 3 days)	Son of Elizabeth II and Philip of Greece and Denmark

== Members ==
The 1917 proclamation stated that the name of the Royal House and all British descendants of Victoria and Albert in the male line were to bear the name of Windsor, except for women who married into other families.

=== Descendants of Elizabeth II ===
In 1947, Princess Elizabeth (who would become Queen Elizabeth II), heir presumptive to King George VI, married Philip Mountbatten (born Prince Philip of Greece and Denmark), a member of the House of Schleswig-Holstein-Sonderburg-Glücksburg, a branch of the House of Oldenburg. A few months before his marriage, Philip abandoned his princely titles and adopted the surname Mountbatten, which was that of his maternal uncle and mentor, Louis Mountbatten, 1st Earl Mountbatten of Burma, and had itself been adopted by Lord Mountbatten's father (Philip's maternal grandfather), Prince Louis of Battenberg, in 1917. It is the literal translation of the German Battenberg, which refers to Battenberg, a small town in Hesse.

Soon after Elizabeth became queen in 1952, Lord Mountbatten observed that because it was the standard practice for the wife in a marriage to adopt her husband's surname, the House of Mountbatten now reigned. When Elizabeth's grandmother Queen Mary heard of this comment, she informed British Prime Minister Winston Churchill and he later advised the Queen to issue a royal proclamation declaring that the royal house was to remain known as the House of Windsor. This she did on 9 April 1952, officially declaring it her "Will and Pleasure that I and My children shall be styled and known as the House and Family of Windsor, and that My descendants, other than female descendants who marry and their descendants, shall bear the name of Windsor." Philip privately complained, "I am nothing but a bloody amoeba. I am the only man in the country not allowed to give his name to his own children."

On 8 February 1960, some years after both the death of Queen Mary and the resignation of Churchill, the Queen confirmed that she and her children would continue to be known as the "House and Family of Windsor", as would any agnatic descendants (through the male line of succession, or patrilineality) who enjoy the style of Royal Highness and the title of prince or princess. Still, Elizabeth also decreed that her agnatic descendants who do not have that style and title would bear the surname Mountbatten-Windsor. There are 26 descendants of Elizabeth II as of 2025.

This came after some months of correspondence between the Prime Minister Harold Macmillan and the constitutional expert Edward Iwi. Iwi had raised the prospect that the royal child due to be born in February 1960 would bear "the Badge of Bastardy" if it were given its mother's maiden name (Windsor) rather than its father's name (Mountbatten). Macmillan had attempted to rebuff Iwi, until the Queen advised Rab Butler in January 1960 that for some time she had her heart set on a change that would recognise the name, Mountbatten. She wished to make this change before the birth of her child. The issue did not affect Prince Charles or Princess Anne, as they had been born Mountbatten before the Queen's accession to the throne. Prince Andrew was born 11 days later, on 19 February 1960.

Any future monarch can change the dynastic name through a similar royal proclamation, as the royal prerogative in the United Kingdom covers it.

=== Family tree ===
- Red-framed persons are living
- Black-framed persons are deceased
- Bold borders indicate children of British monarchs

Family tree of the House of Windsor

King; George V	Queen Mary
King Edward VIII (Note: After his abdication in 1936, King Edward VIII became the Duke of Windsor.)	King George VI	Queen Elizabeth	Mary, Princess Royal and Countess of Harewood	Prince Henry, Duke of Gloucester	Princess Alice, Duchess of Gloucester	Prince George, Duke of Kent	Princess Marina, Duchess of Kent	Prince John
Prince Philip, Duke of Edinburgh	Queen Elizabeth II	Princess Margaret, Countess of Snowdon	Prince William of Gloucester	The Duchess of Gloucester (Birgitte)	The Duke of Gloucester (Richard)	Prince Edward, Duke of Kent	Katharine, Duchess of Kent	Princess Alexandra, The Honourable Lady Ogilvy	Prince Michael of Kent	Princess Michael of Kent (Marie-Christine)
The Queen (Camilla)	The King (Charles III)	Diana, Princess of Wales (divorced)	The Princess Royal (Anne)	Andrew Mountbatten-Windsor	Sarah Ferguson (divorced)	The Duke of Edinburgh (Edward)	The Duchess of Edinburgh (Sophie)
The Princess of Wales (Catherine)	The Prince of Wales (William)	The Duke of Sussex (Harry)	The Duchess of Sussex (Meghan)	Princess Beatrice, Mrs Edoardo Mapelli Mozzi	Princess Eugenie, Mrs Jack Brooksbank	Lady Louise Mountbatten-Windsor	Earl of Wessex (James)
Prince George of Wales	Princess Charlotte of Wales	Prince Louis of Wales	Prince Archie of Sussex	Princess Lilibet of Sussex

== States reigned over ==
At the creation of the House of Windsor, its head reigned over the British Empire. Following the end of the First World War, however, shifts took place that saw the emergence of the Dominions of the British Commonwealth as independent states. The shift was recognised in the Balfour Declaration of 1926, the Royal and Parliamentary Titles Act 1927, and the Statute of Westminster 1931. The Windsors became recognised as the royal family of multiple independent countries, a number that shifted over the decades, as some Dominions became republics and Crown colonies became realms, republics, or monarchies under a different sovereign. Since 1949, three monarchs of the House of Windsor, George VI, Elizabeth II and Charles III, have also been Head of the Commonwealth of Nations, comprising most parts of the former British Empire and some states that were never part of it.

Country	Dates
Antigua and Barbuda	1981–present
Australia	1917–present
Bahamas	1973–present
Barbados	1966–2021
Belize	1981–present
Canada	1917–present
Ceylon	1948–1972
Fiji	1970–1987
The Gambia	1965–1970
Ghana	1957–1960
Grenada	1974–present
Guyana	1966–1970
India	1947–1950
Irish Free State	1922–1936
Jamaica	1962–present
Malawi	1964–1966
Malta	1964–1974
Mauritius	1968–1992
New Zealand	1917–present
Nigeria	1960–1963
Dominion of Pakistan	1947–1956
Papua New Guinea	1975–present
Saint Kitts and Nevis	1983–present
Saint Lucia	1979–present
Saint Vincent and the Grenadines	1979–present
Sierra Leone	1961–1971
Solomon Islands	1978–present
South Africa	1917–1961
Tanganyika	1961–1962
Trinidad and Tobago	1962–1976
Tuvalu	1978–present
Uganda	1962–1963
United Kingdom	1917–present

== See also ==
- List of current British princes and princesses
- British royal family
- Monarchy of Canada § Royal family and house
- British princess
- Descendants of George V
- Succession to the British throne

== Notes ==
Royal House House of Windsor
Preceded by House of Saxe-Coburg and Gotha (Renamed House of Windsor by Royal Proclamation of 17 July 1917)	Ruling House of the United Kingdom; 1917–present	Incumbent
