= Solomon Islands Independence Medal =

- Type: Independence Medal
- Presented by: the Solomon Islands
- Eligibility: Civilian, military and police personnel
- Established: 1978
- Ribbon of medal

Precedence
- Next (higher): Royal Solomon Islands Police Long Service & Good Conduct Medal
- Next (lower): 10th Anniversary of Independence Medal

The Solomon Islands Independence Medal was created in 1978 to commemorate the transition from self-government to the full independence of the Solomon Islands. It is a part of the Solomon Islands honours system.

== Description ==
The medal is round, made of silver coloured metal. The obverse bears the Cecil Thomas portrait of Queen Elizabeth II, surrounded by the inscription Elizabeth II Dei Gratia Regina F:D:. The reverse bears the Coat of Arms of the Solomon Islands surrounded by the inscription Solomon Islands Independence Medal 1978. The medal is held by a ring suspension to a ribbon of equal stripes of blue, yellow, white, yellow, and green.

== Order of precedence ==
Country	Preceding	Following
(United Kingdom) United Kingdom; Order of precedence	Papua New Guinea Independence Medal	Service Medal of the Order of St John

Year	Class	Name
1984	Order of Solomon Islands C.S.I	Barry Clarke
1984	Solomon Islands Medal S.I.M	Joseph A. Hazbun; Henry Awaihaka; Patrick Luifo'oa Gwaimaua; Gilbert Leve; David Ridley Kapitana; Patteson Seda; Chin Foot Hap
1984	Meritorious Service Medal	Albert Kokili; Matthew Biulasi; Lester Thugea
1984	Long Service & Good Conduct Medal	Christopher Kiri; William Menaiati; Mataniah Fakavai
