= Service Medal of the Order of St John =

Long service medal of the Order of St John

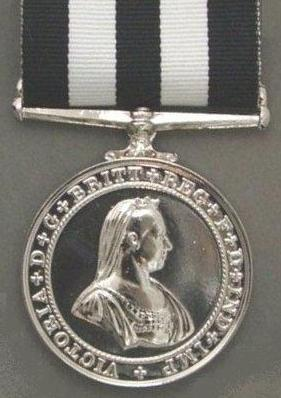
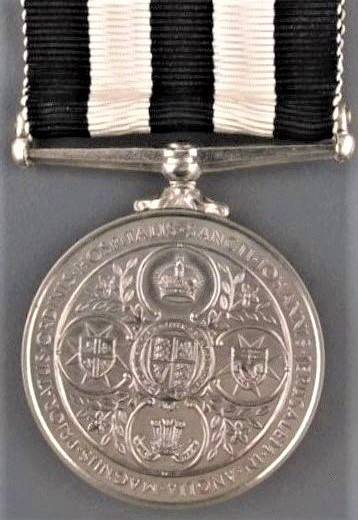
- Old style Medal: obverse and reverse
- Type: Medal for conspicuous and long service
- Awarded for: Continuous service
- Presented by: Most Venerable Order of the Hospital of St John of Jerusalem
- Eligibility: Those affiliated with the Order of St John and its subsidiary institutions
- Status: Currently awarded
- Established: 1895
- First award: 1899
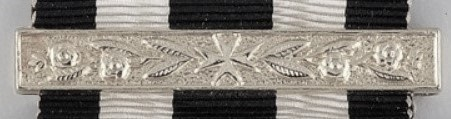
- Ribbon Bar for additional service, design since 1924

Precedence
- Next (higher): Depends on country
- Next (lower): Depends on country

ULS Extension of the Service Medal of the Order of St John
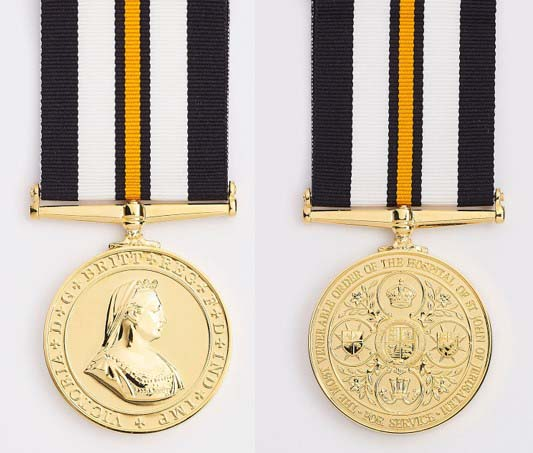
- Medal: ULS Extension obverse and reverse
- Type: Medal for Ultra long service
- Awarded for: Continuous service
- Presented by: Most Venerable Order of the Hospital of St John of Jerusalem
- Eligibility: Those affiliated with the Order of St John and its subsidiary establishments
- Status: Currently awarded
- Established: 2019
- First award: 2020
- Ribbon

Precedence
- Next (higher): Worn in place of the Service Medal of the Order
- Next (lower): Worn in place of the Service Medal of the Order

The Service Medal of the Order of St John is awarded to recognise both conspicuous and long service with the Venerable Order of St John, particularly in St John Ambulance, both in the United Kingdom and in a number of other Commonwealth countries and Hong Kong. The award was announced in the St John Ambulance Brigade General Regulations for 1895 and minted in 1899, though the first honourees had been selected the previous year.

== Description ==
The cupro-nickel, rhodium-plated medal features on its obverse the head of Queen Victoria and the legend VICTORIA + D + G + BRITT + REG + F + D + IND + IMP (Victoria, by the Grace of God, Queen of Britain, Defender of the Faith, and Empress of India). The reverse displays the legend MAGNUS · PRIORATUS · ORDINIS · HOSPITALIS · SANCTI · JOHANNIS · JERUSALEM · IN · ANGLIA (Grand Priory of the Order of the Hospital of St. John of Jerusalem in England) along with five equally sized circles in a cross holding individual heraldic icons supported by sprawling St John's Wort. These are (a) the Imperial Crown (b) the Royal Arms (c) the Arms of the Prince of Wales who was the first Grand Prior under the Royal Charter of 1888 (d) the Crest of that Prince of Wales, and (e) the then Arms of the Order. With effect from 1 January 2020, and following depletion of manufacturer's stock, medals will be issued with the inscription "THE MOST VENERABLE ORDER OF THE HOSPITAL OF ST JOHN OF JERUSALEM", and "FOR SERVICE" at the bottom. In Canada the legend will be in Latin, "VENERABILISSIMI ORDINIS HOSPITALIS SANCTI JOHANNIS HIEROSOLYMITANI".

On 1 January 2020, an Ultra Long Service (ULS) extension to the St John Service Medal was introduced. It is of the same design as the Service Medal using base metal with a gold or similar plate finish. This version of the Service Medal will be awarded to recognize 50 years of qualifying service. Subsequent service will be recognized by gold bars every five years.

It is the only Commonwealth medal to retain the effigy of Queen Victoria on a current issue, the image based on a bust of the Queen created by Princess Louise, Duchess of Argyll. The medal's design has been largely unaltered since its creation, though the script changed from gothic to seriffed capital letters in 1960, and the metal composition has evolved from its original silver, to silver plated base metal (1947), silver plated cupro-nickel (1960), before reaching its current rhodium-plated cupro-nickel composition in 1966. The medal had a ring suspension until 1913, when a straight bar suspension was introduced. The original practice of naming the recipient on the rim of the medal gradually ceased, except in New Zealand and South Africa.

The medal is suspended from a 38mm wide ribbon that has three black and two white stripes of equal width. On the ULS extension ribbon the central black stripe is dissected by a 3mm gold stripe. Where additional services beyond those required for the award have been performed, the ribbon may display a silver bar for each five years of additional service up to three silver bars. After twenty years of additional service all silver bars are removed and a gold bar is awarded. Thereafter each further five years of additional service a gold bar is awarded up to the 4 gold bars that will mark thirty five years of additional service. After fifty years of service (forty additional years) the Service Medal is removed and replaced by the Ultra Long Service extension. Gold bars are awarded thereafter for each five additional years. All bars are represented on the undress ribbon by one or more appropriately coloured Maltese crosses.

From 1932 until after the Second World War, a top suspender broach bar was issued to recipients who served with either the Military Hospitals Reserve or the Voluntary Aid Detachments. The bar is silver and bears the letters 'M.H.R.' or 'V.A.D.', as appropriate, surmounted by crown. When the ribbon was worn alone, a roundel with the appropriate initials was worn on the ribbon.

== Qualifications ==
The medal is typically awarded to recognise efficient service to an eligible person who performs qualifying service in each year, which is properly recorded and certified, for the requisite period of years. While the length of service required for recognition has varied, in 2020 the qualifying period of service was standardised worldwide to ten years for the Service Medal and fifty years for the ULS extension.

== Order of wear ==
In the United Kingdom, the Service Medal comes after the Solomon Islands Independence Medal and before the Badge of the Order of the League of Mercy in the order precedence. In Canada, the medal comes after the Queen's Medal for Champion Shot and before the Commissionaires Long Service Medal. In Australia, the Service Medal should be worn as a long service medal after all other Imperial long service awards. In New Zealand, the Service Medal is worn after Commonwealth Independence Medals instituted by the Sovereign, and before Commonwealth Awards instituted by the Sovereign as Head of State, other than those of New Zealand or the United Kingdom.

== See also ==
- Venerable Order of St John
- Royal Red Cross
