= Descendants of Queen Victoria =

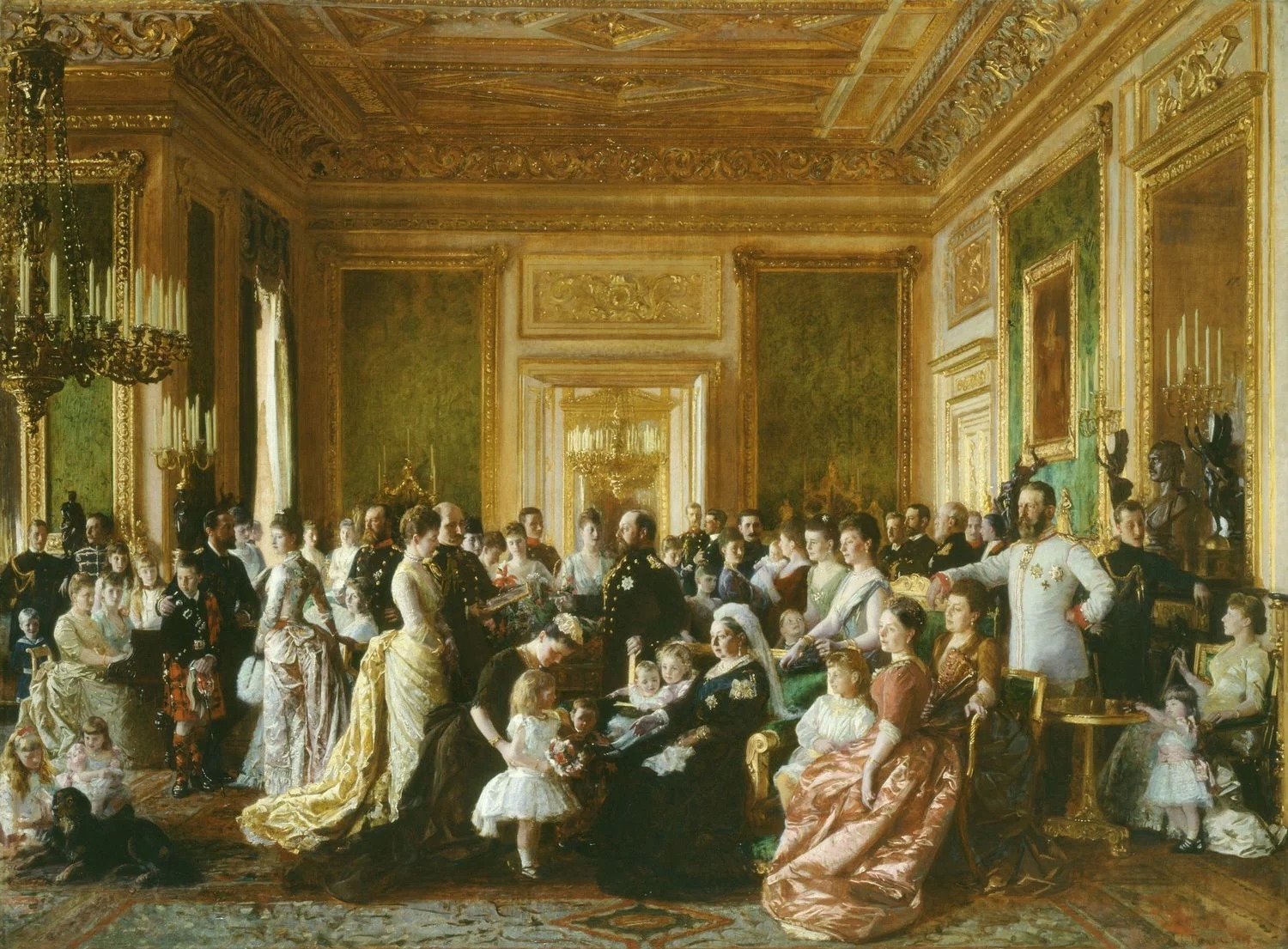
1887 portrait of Queen Victoria and her family by Laurits Tuxen

Victoria (24 May 1819 – 22 January 1901) was Queen of the United Kingdom from 1837 to 1901. She and her prince consort, Albert of Saxe-Coburg and Gotha (26 August 1819 – 14 December 1861), became the ancestors of many members of European royalty.

Victoria married Albert, her first cousin, on 10 February 1840, less than three years after she acceded to the throne. Although Victoria and Albert had a loving and intimate marriage, she struggled with pregnancy and motherhood. Her relationship with her eldest son, Albert Edward, Prince of Wales (later Edward VII) was notably strained, and her animosity intensified following Albert's death in 1861.

Eight of Victoria and Albert's nine children had children of their own. Through these marriages, their descendants married into royal families across Europe, where many became either monarchs themselves or royal consorts, earning Victoria the nickname "grandmother of Europe." Their grandson Wilhelm II, for instance, became the Emperor of Germany, while their granddaughter Alix became the empress consort of Russia.

== Background ==
=== Queen Victoria ===
The daughter of Prince Edward, Duke of Kent and Strathearn and Princess Victoria of Saxe-Coburg-Saalfeld, Victoria experienced the death of her father at eight months of age. Consequently, she was raised in isolation by her mother until becoming Queen of the United Kingdom in 1837.

In the early years of her reign, Victoria's first prime minister, William Lamb, 2nd Viscount Melbourne, influenced her to govern as a constitutional monarch. Throughout her reign, events such as the passing of the Reform Act 1867 and the introduction of the secret ballot in 1872 broadened the British electorate.

Following Albert's death in 1861, Victoria withdrew from public life, eroding the popularity of the British monarchy. However, by the time of her Golden Jubilee in 1887, she had restored her public popularity. Victoria celebrated her Diamond Jubilee a decade later, eventually dying in 1901.

=== Prince Albert ===
The younger son of Ernest I, Duke of Saxe-Coburg and Gotha and Princess Louise of Saxe-Gotha-Altenburg, Albert spent his childhood at Schloss Rosenau, Coburg. His uncle, Leopold I of Belgium, hoped that Albert would marry Victoria. Leopold arranged the first meeting between Albert and Victoria in 1836, with the latter two eventually marrying four years later.

After marrying Victoria, Albert had considerable influence over her in foreign affairs, freely corresponding with European monarchs. In addition, Albert believed that the United Kingdom should be at the forefront of modern science and art education.

During the 1850s, overwork caused Albert to become increasingly tired and suffer from ill health. Eventually, Albert died from typhoid fever in 1861, with Victoria and five of his children at his side.

=== Marriage ===
Victoria was married to Albert on 10 February 1840 by William Howley, the Archbishop of Canterbury, in the Chapel Royal of St James's Palace in Westminster.

Family of Victoria, Queen of the United Kingdom
Portrait	Name	Birth	Death	Descendants
Portrait of Queen Victoria	Victoria, Queen of the United Kingdom r. 1837–1901	24 May 1819	22 January 1901	9 children, including: Victoria, German Empress; Edward VII, King of the United Kingdom; Alice, Grand Duchess of Hesse; Alfred, Duke of Saxe-Coburg and Gotha
Portrait of Prince Albert of the United Kingdom	Prince Albert of Saxe-Coburg and Gotha	26 August 1819	14 December 1861	9 children, including: Victoria, German Empress; Edward VII, King of the United Kingdom; Alice, Grand Duchess of Hesse; Alfred, Duke of Saxe-Coburg and Gotha

== Children ==
Queen Victoria, at times, had contentious relations with her children. Possibly due to her own childhood isolation, Victoria struggled to connect with and relate to her own children, particularly in their younger years. She also, occasionally, resented that they interfered with time that she would prefer to spend with Albert. According to one modern author, both Victoria and Albert habitually displayed undisguised favouritism amongst their children. Both Victoria and Alfred were the favourites of Albert, and Arthur enjoyed the favouritism of both his parents.

According to one modern author, Queen Victoria was initially jealous of the time that Albert had spent with Princess Victoria, but in her widowhood, Queen Victoria made Princess Victoria something of her confidante. For her part, Princess Victoria had accrued hundreds of letters from her mother, to the point that shortly before her death, she had them smuggled out of Germany by her brother's secretary, Sir Frederick Ponsonby.

Of her sons, Queen Victoria had the most trouble with her eldest, Albert Edward, and her youngest, Leopold. Among her daughters, Victoria clashed often with Louise. She also had an awkward relationship with her second-eldest daughter, Alice, whom the queen, despite praising her thoughtfulness, also criticised as being too melancholy and self-absorbed. In her widowhood, Victoria expected Beatrice, who was only four when her father died, to remain at home with her, and only permitted her to marry on the condition that she and her husband would remain in England.

Portrait of Queen Victoria and Prince Albert's family

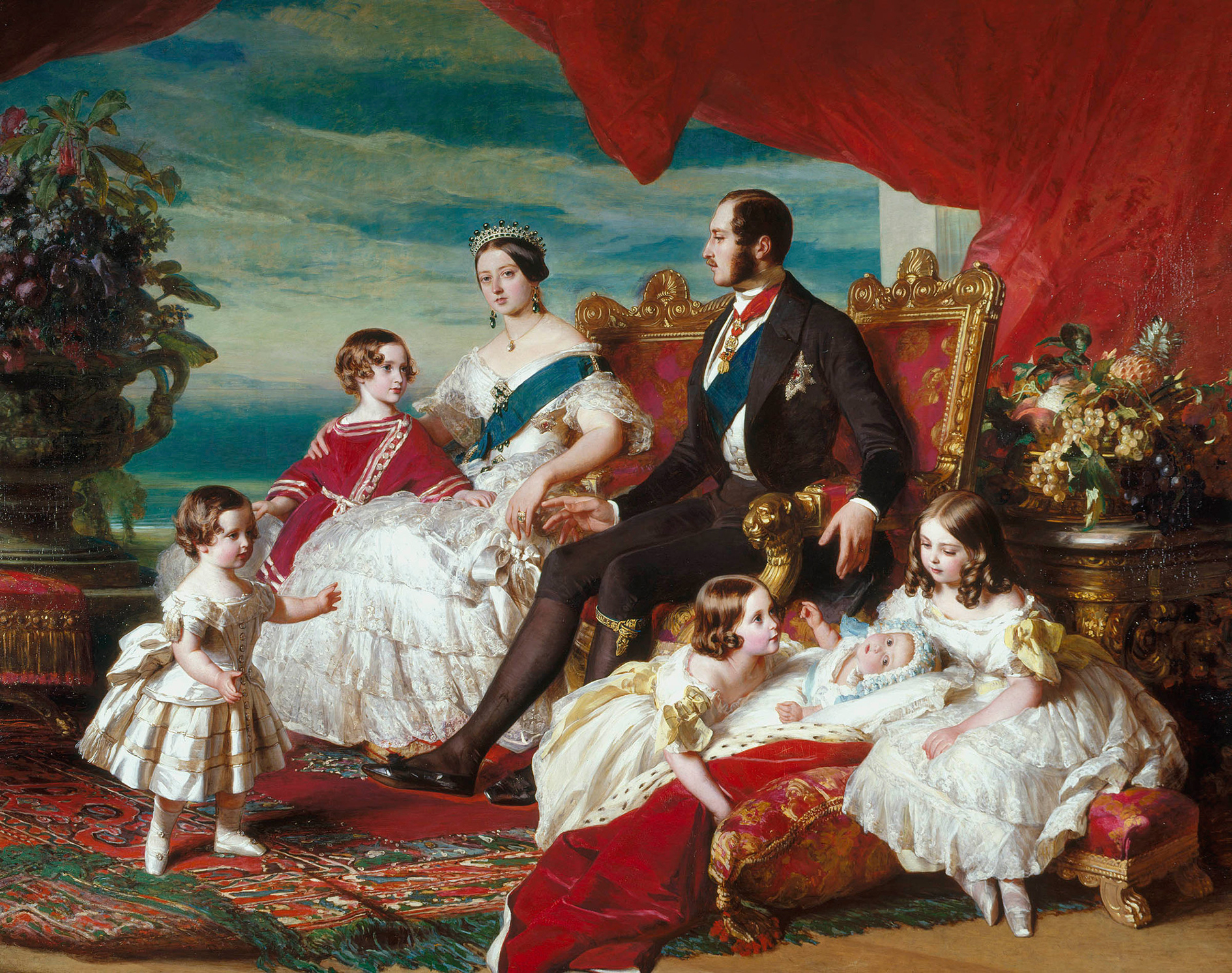
From left to right: Alfred, Duke of Saxe-Coburg and Gotha, Edward VII, King of the United Kingdom, Victoria, Queen of the United Kingdom, Albert, Prince Consort, Alice, Grand Duchess of Hesse, Princess Helena of the United Kingdom and Victoria, German Empress

Children of Victoria, Queen of the United Kingdom
Portrait	Name	Birth	Death	Family
Portrait of Victoria, Princess Royal	Victoria, Princess Royal	21 November 1840	5 August 1901	Married 1858, Frederick III, German Emperor (1831–1888; r. 1888); 8 children (including Wilhelm II, German Emperor and Sophia, Queen of the Hellenes)
Portrait of King Edward VII of the United Kingdom	Edward VII, King of the United Kingdom r. 1901–1910	9 November 1841	6 May 1910	Married 1863, Princess Alexandra of Denmark (1844–1925); 6 children (including George V, King of the United Kingdom and Maud, Queen of Norway)
Portrait of Princess Alice of the United Kingdom	Princess Alice of the United Kingdom	25 April 1843	14 December 1878	Married 1862, Louis IV, Grand Duke of Hesse (1837–1892; r. 1877–1892); 7 children (including Alexandra Feodorovna, Empress of Russia)
Portrait of Prince Alfred of the United Kingdom	Alfred, Duke of Saxe-Coburg and Gotha r. 1893–1900	6 August 1844	30 July 1900	Married 1874, Grand Duchess Maria Alexandrovna of Russia (1853–1920); 6 children (including Marie, Queen of Romania)
Portrait of Princess Helena of the United Kingdom	Princess Helena of the United Kingdom	25 May 1846	9 June 1923	Married 1866, Prince Christian of Schleswig-Holstein (1831–1917); 6 children
Portrait of Princess Louise of the United Kingdom	Princess Louise of the United Kingdom	18 March 1848	3 December 1939	Married 1871, John Campbell, 9th Duke of Argyll (1845–1914)
Portrait of Prince Arthur of the United Kingdom	Prince Arthur, Duke of Connaught and Strathearn	1 May 1850	16 January 1942	Married 1879, Princess Louise Margaret of Prussia (1860–1917); 3 children (including Margaret, Crown Princess of Sweden)
Portrait of Prince Leopold of the United Kingdom	Prince Leopold, Duke of Albany	7 April 1853	28 March 1884	Married 1882, Princess Helen of Waldeck and Pyrmont (1861–1922); 2 children
Portrait of Princess Beatrice of the United Kingdom	Princess Beatrice of the United Kingdom	14 April 1857	26 October 1944	Married 1885, Prince Henry of Battenberg (1858–1896); 4 children (including Victoria Eugenie, Queen of Spain)

== Grandchildren ==
=== Children of Victoria and Frederick III ===
In 1851, at the Great Exhibition, Victoria met her future husband, Frederick. When Victoria was 15 years old, Frederick proposed to her. Eventually, on 25 January 1858, they married.

Upon her husband becoming German Emperor as Frederick III, Victoria became German Empress on 9 March 1888. However, only 99 days later, Frederick died of cancer. Consequently, their eldest son, Wilhelm II, became German Emperor, Victoria’s only grandchild besides George V of her native UK to become a monarch.

Portrait of Emperor Frederick III and Empress Victoria's family

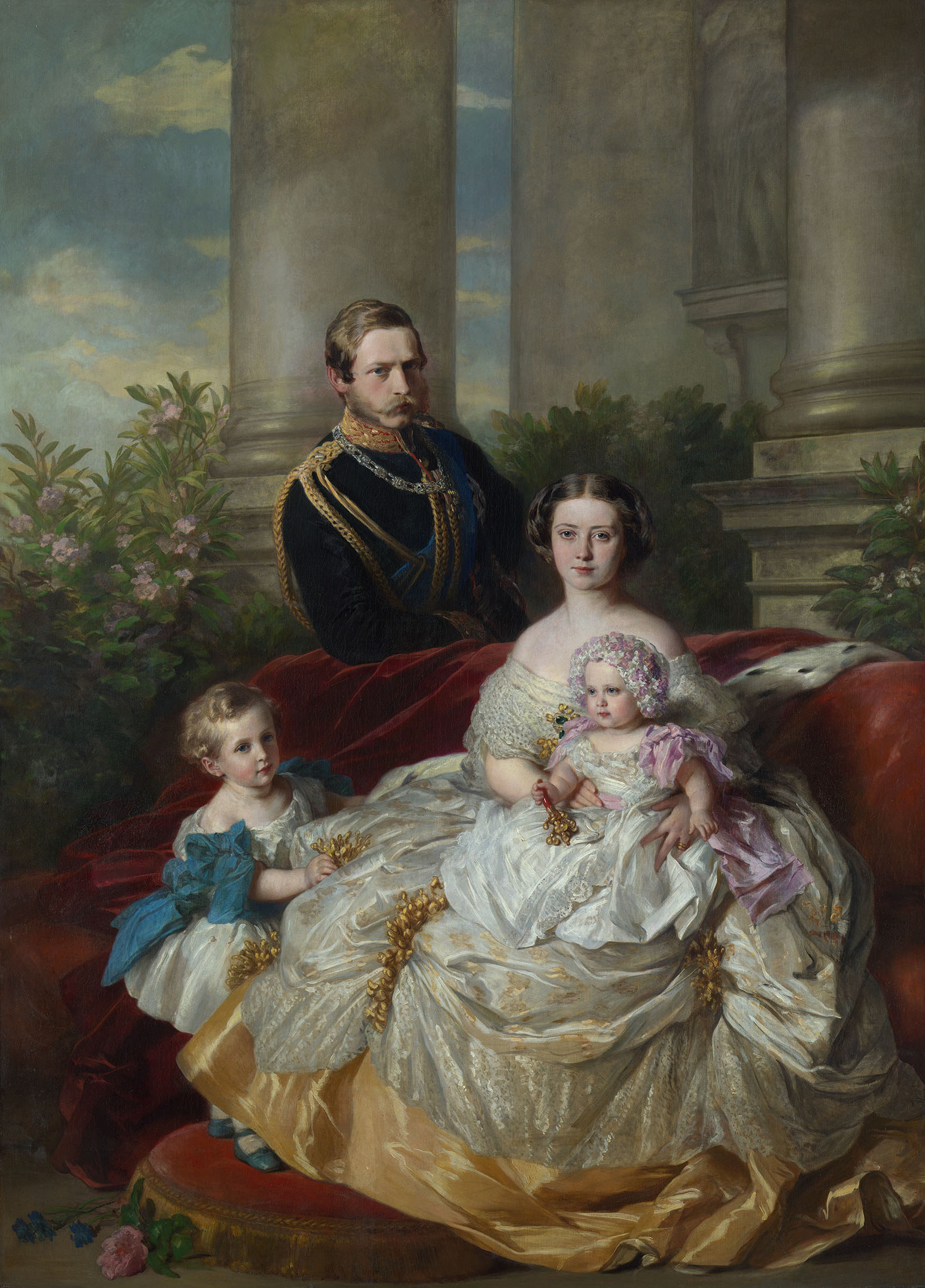
From left to right: Wilhelm II, German Emperor, Frederick III, German Emperor, Victoria, German Empress and Charlotte, Duchess of Saxe-Meiningen

Children of Victoria, German Empress
Portrait	Name	Birth	Death	Family
Portrait of Emperor Wilhelm II of Germany	Wilhelm II, German Emperor r. 1888–1918	27 January 1859	4 June 1941	
Portrait of Emperor Wilhelm II of Germany	Wilhelm II, German Emperor r. 1888–1918	27 January 1859	4 June 1941	Married 1881 (1), Princess Augusta Victoria of Schleswig-Holstein (1858–1921) and had 7 children: Wilhelm, German Crown Prince (1882–1951); Prince Eitel Friedrich of Prussia (1883–1942); Prince Adalbert of Prussia (1884–1948); Prince August Wilhelm of Prussia (1887–1949); Prince Oskar of Prussia (1888–1958); Prince Joachim of Prussia (1890–1920); Princess Victoria Louise of Prussia (1892–1980); Mother of Frederica, Queen of the Hellenes
Portrait of Emperor Wilhelm II of Germany	Wilhelm II, German Emperor r. 1888–1918	27 January 1859	4 June 1941	Married 1922 (2), Princess Hermine Reuss of Greiz (1887–1947)
Portrait of Princess Charlotte of Prussia	Princess Charlotte of Prussia	24 July 1860	1 October 1919	Married 1878, Bernhard III, Duke of Saxe-Meiningen (1851–1928; r. 1914–1918) and had 1 child: Princess Feodora of Saxe-Meiningen (1879–1945)
Portrait of Prince Henry of Prussia	Prince Henry of Prussia	14 August 1862	20 April 1929	Married 1888, Princess Irene of Hesse and by Rhine (1866–1953) and had 3 children: Prince Waldemar of Prussia (1889–1945); Prince Sigismund of Prussia (1896–1978); Prince Henry of Prussia (1900–1904)
Portrait of Prince Sigismund of Prussia	Prince Sigismund of Prussia	15 September 1864	18 June 1866	Died of meningitis, aged 21 months.
Portrait of Princess Viktoria of Prussia	Princess Viktoria of Prussia	12 April 1866	13 November 1929	
Portrait of Princess Viktoria of Prussia	Princess Viktoria of Prussia	12 April 1866	13 November 1929	Married 1890 (1), Prince Adolf of Schaumburg-Lippe (1859–1916)
Portrait of Princess Viktoria of Prussia	Princess Viktoria of Prussia	12 April 1866	13 November 1929	Married 1927 (2), Alexander Zoubkoff
Portrait of Prince Waldemar of Prussia	Prince Waldemar of Prussia	10 February 1868	27 March 1879	Died of diphtheria, aged ten.
Portrait of Princess Sophia of Prussia	Princess Sophia of Prussia	14 June 1870	13 January 1932	Married 1889, Constantine I, King of the Hellenes (1868–1923; r. 1913–1917, 1920–1922) and had 6 children: George II, King of the Hellenes (1890–1947; r. 1922–1924, 1935–1947); Alexander, King of the Hellenes (1893–1920; r. 1917–1920); Father of Alexandra, Queen of Yugoslavia; Helen, Queen Mother of Romania (1896–1982); Mother of Michael I, King of Romania; Paul, King of the Hellenes (1901–1964; r. 1947–1964); Father of Sofía, Queen of Spain and Constantine II, King of the Hellenes; Princess Irene of Greece and Denmark (1904–1974); Princess Katherine of Greece and Denmark (1913 –2007)
Portrait of Princess Margaret of Prussia	Princess Margaret of Prussia	22 April 1872	22 January 1954	Married 1893, Prince Frederick Charles of Hesse (1868–1940) and had 6 children: Prince Friedrich Wilhelm of Hesse (1893–1916); Prince Maximilian of Hesse (1894–1914); Prince Philipp of Hesse (1896–1980); Prince Wolfgang of Hesse (1896–1989); Prince Richard of Hesse (1901–1969); Prince Christoph of Hesse (1901–1943)

=== Children of Edward VII and Alexandra ===
In 1861, Princess Alexandra met King Edward VII of the United Kingdom, then called Albert Edward Prince of Wales, at the Speyer Cathedral in Germany. Edward was the eldest son of Queen Victoria and Prince Albert. Edward later proposed to Alexandra in 1862, and they married in 1863 at St George's Chapel in Windsor Castle in the United Kingdom.

Although Alexandra and Edward got along fairly well, Edward engaged in several affairs during their marriage. However, for the most part, Alexandra did not pay attention to her husband's romantic liaisons.

Together, Alexandra and Edward had six children. One of these children, Alexander John, died in infancy. Furthermore, Alexandra and Edward's eldest son, Albert Victor, died in 1892 after contracting an illness during a flu pandemic. Albert Victor's death devastated Alexandra.

The three daughters of Edward and Alexandra, Louise, Victoria, and Maud, were known for being active during their youth. As the daughters aged, they became more withdrawn. Alexandra did not want Louise, Victoria, and Maud to marry because her daughters had two brothers who could potentially follow Edward to the British throne. However, both Louise and Maud eventually married.

Portrait of Queen Alexandra and King Edward VII's family

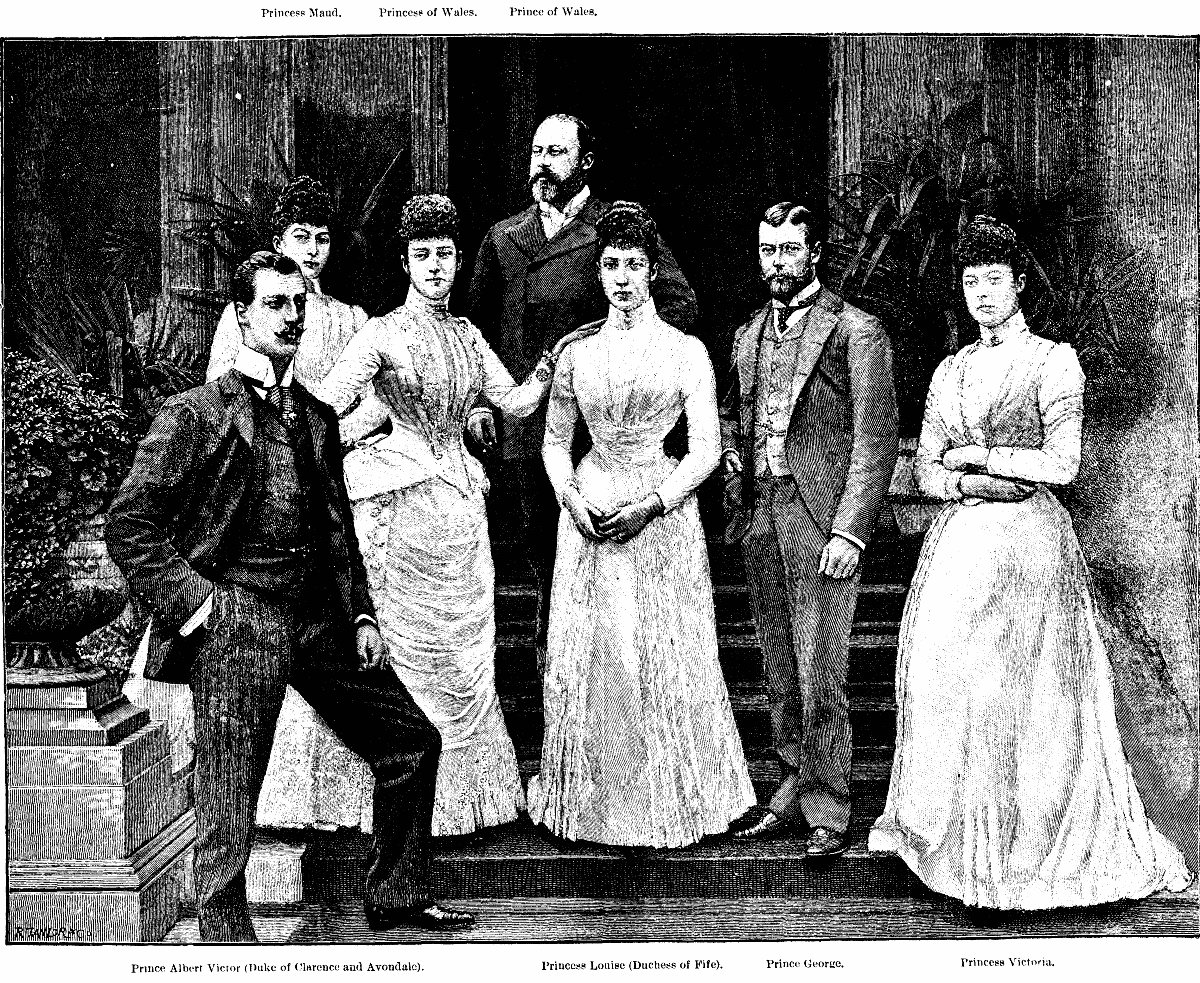
From left to right: Prince Albert Victor, Duke of Clarence and Avondale, Maud, Queen of Norway, Alexandra, Queen of the United Kingdom, Edward VII, King of the United Kingdom, Louise, Princess Royal and Duchess of Fife, George V, King of the United Kingdom, and Princess Victoria of the United Kingdom

Family tree of King Edward VII, Queen Alexandra, and their royal descendants

Edward VII of the United Kingdom	Alexandra of Denmark
Prince Albert Victor, Duke of Clarence and Avondale	Mary of Teck	George V of the United Kingdom	2 other children (Note: A sixth child of Alexandra, Alexander John, died in infancy.)	Haakon VII of Norway	Maud of Wales
Edward VIII of the United Kingdom	George VI of the United Kingdom	4 other children	Olav V of Norway
Elizabeth II of the United Kingdom	Harald V of Norway
Charles III of the United Kingdom	Haakon VIII of Norway
William, Prince of Wales	Ingrid Alexandra, Crown Princess of Norway
Prince George of Wales

Children of Alexandra, Queen of the United Kingdom
Portrait	Name	Birth	Death	Family
Portrait of Prince Albert Victor of the United Kingdom	Prince Albert Victor, Duke of Clarence and Avondale	8 January 1864	14 January 1892	Died unmarried
Portrait of King George V of the United Kingdom	George V, King of the United Kingdom r. 1910–1936	3 June 1865	20 January 1936	Married 1893, Princess Victoria Mary of Teck (1867–1953) and had 6 children: Edward VIII, King of the United Kingdom (1894–1972; r. 1936); George VI, King of the United Kingdom (1895–1952; r. 1936–1952); Father of Elizabeth II, Queen of the United Kingdom; Mary, Princess Royal (1897–1965); Prince Henry, Duke of Gloucester (1900–1974); Prince George, Duke of Kent (1902–1942); Prince John of the United Kingdom (1905–1919)
Portrait of Princess Louise of the United Kingdom	Louise, Princess Royal	20 February 1867	4 January 1931	Married 1889, Alexander Duff, 1st Duke of Fife (1849–1912), and had 3 children: Alistair Duff, Marquess of Macduff (1890–1890); Princess Alexandra, 2nd Duchess of Fife (1891–1959); Princess Maud of the United Kingdom (1893–1945)
Portrait of Princess Victoria of the United Kingdom	Princess Victoria of the United Kingdom	6 July 1868	3 December 1935	Died unmarried
Portrait of Queen Maud of Norway	Princess Maud of Wales	26 November 1869	20 November 1938	Married 1896, Haakon VII, King of Norway (1872–1957; r. 1905–1957), and had 1 child: Olav V, King of Norway (1903–1991; r. 1957–1991); Father of Harald V, King of Norway
Coat of arms representing Prince Alexander John of the United Kingdom	Prince Alexander John of Wales	6 April 1871	7 April 1871	

=== Children of Alice and Louis IV ===
Less than a year after her father, Albert, died, Princess Alice married Louis IV, Grand Duke of Hesse. However, Alice later wrote to her husband that she "longed for a real companion, for apart from that life had nothing to offer me in Darmstadt".

Even after moving to Germany, Alice's love of the United Kingdom did not waver. She possessed numerous portraits of her relatives, and she instilled in her children an admiration for the United Kingdom. Even after her death, her family's life was organised with English influences.

Alice devoted her life to her husband and children. Her children followed rules similar to those that Alice's own mother, Queen Victoria, made her follow. Her family spent winters in Darmstadt and summers at either Kranichstein or Seeheim-Jugenheim. Also, Alice and her family made annual trips to the United Kingdom, staying either at Windsor Castle, Osborne House or Balmoral Castle.

Portrait of Grand Duke Louis IV and Grand Duchess Alice's family

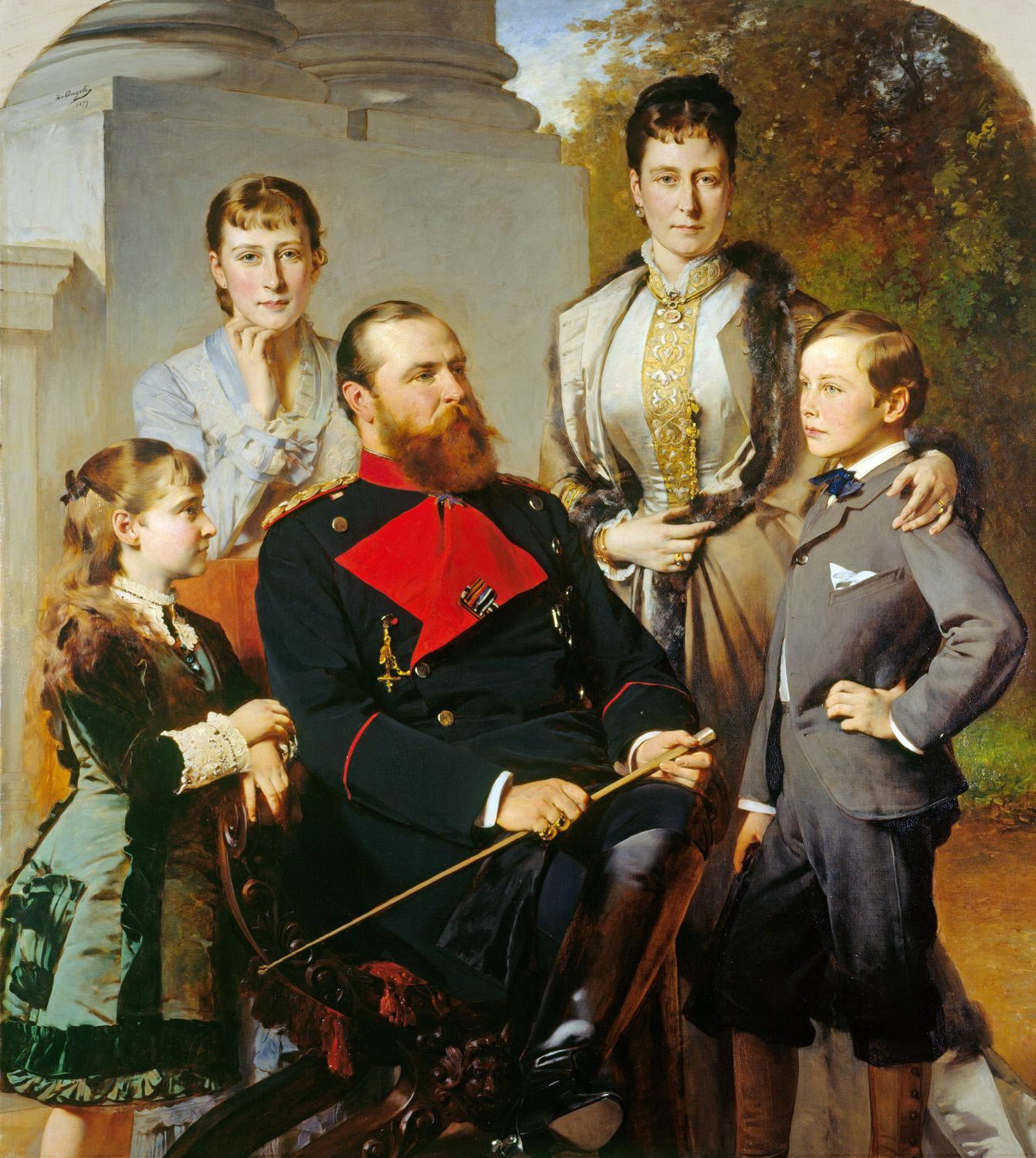
From left to right: Alexandra Feodorovna, Empress of Russia, Grand Duchess Elizabeth Feodorovna of Russia, Louis IV, Grand Duke of Hesse, Alice, Grand Duchess of Hesse and Ernest Louis, Grand Duke of Hesse

Children of Alice, Grand Duchess of Hesse
Portrait	Name	Birth	Death	Family
Portrait of Princess Victoria of Hesse	Princess Victoria of Hesse and by Rhine	5 April 1863	24 September 1950	Married 1884, Prince Louis of Battenberg (1854–1921) and had 4 children: Princess Alice of Battenberg (1885–1969); Mother of Prince Philip, Duke of Edinburgh; Louise, Queen of Sweden (1889–1965); Prince George of Battenberg (1892–1938); Prince Louis of Battenberg (1900–1979)
Portrait of Princess Elisabeth of Hesse	Princess Elisabeth of Hesse and by Rhine	1 November 1864	18 July 1918	Married 1884, Grand Duke Sergei Alexandrovich of Russia (1857–1905)
Portrait of Princess Irene of Hesse	Princess Irene of Hesse and by Rhine	11 July 1866	11 November 1953	Married 1888, Prince Henry of Prussia (1862–1929) and had 3 children: Prince Waldemar of Prussia (1889–1945); Prince Sigismund of Prussia (1896–1978); Prince Henry of Prussia (1900–1904)
Portrait of Grand Duke Ernest Louis of Hesse	Ernest Louis, Grand Duke of Hesse r. 1892–1918	25 November 1868	9 October 1937	
Portrait of Grand Duke Ernest Louis of Hesse	Ernest Louis, Grand Duke of Hesse r. 1892–1918	25 November 1868	9 October 1937	Married 1894 (1), Princess Victoria Melita of Saxe-Coburg and Gotha (1876–1936) (Note: Ernest Louis and Victoria Melita's marriage ended in divorce in 1901.) and had 2 children: Princess Elisabeth of Hesse and by Rhine (1895–1903); Stillborn son (1900)
Portrait of Grand Duke Ernest Louis of Hesse	Ernest Louis, Grand Duke of Hesse r. 1892–1918	25 November 1868	9 October 1937	Married 1905 (2), Princess Eleonore of Solms-Hohensolms-Lich (1871–1937) and had 2 children: Georg Donatus, Hereditary Grand Duke of Hesse (1906–1937); Prince Louis of Hesse and by Rhine (1908–1968)
Portrait of Prince Friedrich of Hesse	Prince Friedrich of Hesse and by Rhine	7 October 1870	29 May 1873	Died of haemophilia complications after a fall, aged two.
Portrait of Princess Alix of Hesse	Princess Alix of Hesse and by Rhine	6 June 1872	17 July 1918	Married 1894, Nicholas II, Emperor of Russia (1868–1918; r. 1894–1917) and had 5 children: Grand Duchess Olga Nikolaevna of Russia (1895–1918); Grand Duchess Tatiana Nikolaevna of Russia (1897–1918); Grand Duchess Maria Nikolaevna of Russia (1899–1918); Grand Duchess Anastasia Nikolaevna of Russia (1901–1918); Alexei Nikolaevich, Tsarevich of Russia (1904–1918)
Portrait of Princess Marie of Hesse	Princess Marie of Hesse and by Rhine	24 May 1874	16 November 1878	Died of diphtheria, aged four.

=== Children of Alfred and Maria ===
In 1874, Alfred married Grand Duchess Maria Alexandrovna of Russia. They had five children together, and their descendants became part of the Romanian royal family. In particular, Alfred and Maria's daughter, Marie of Edinburgh, married Ferdinand I of Romania.

Portrait of Duke Alfred and Duchess Maria's family

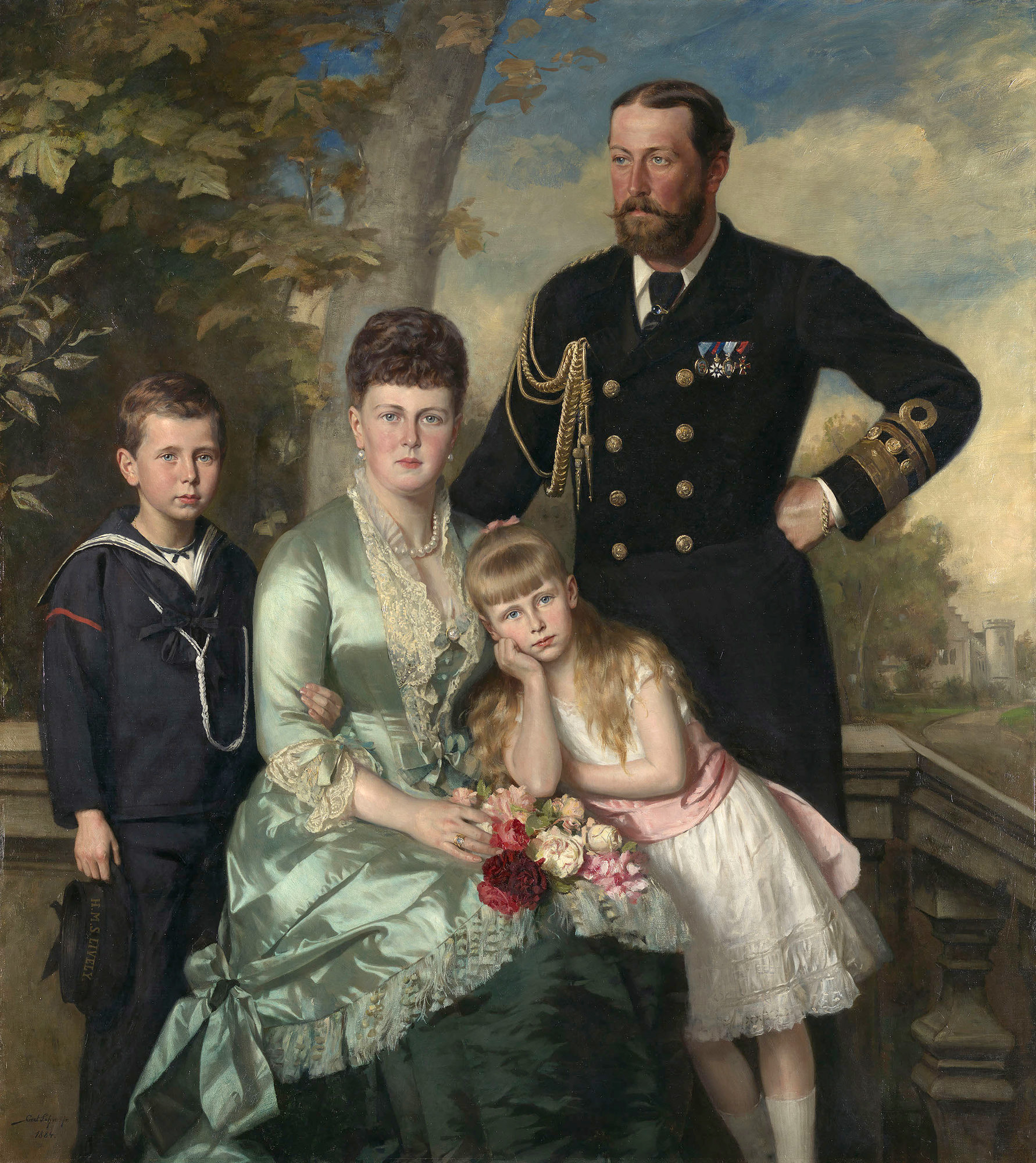
From left to right: Alfred, Hereditary Prince of Saxe-Coburg and Gotha, Maria, Duchess of Saxe-Coburg and Gotha, Marie, Queen of Romania and Alfred, Duke of Saxe-Coburg and Gotha

Children of Alfred, Duke of Saxe-Coburg and Gotha
Portrait	Name	Birth	Death	Family
Portrait of Prince Alfred of Saxe-Coburg and Gotha	Alfred, Hereditary Prince of Saxe-Coburg and Gotha	15 October 1874	6 February 1899	Heir to the Duchy of Saxe-Coburg and Gotha, 1893–1899. Never married, no issue.
Portrait of Queen Marie of Romania	Princess Marie of Edinburgh	29 October 1875	10 July 1938	Married 1893, Ferdinand I, King of Romania (1865–1927; r. 1914–1927) and had 6 children: Carol II, King of Romania (1893–1953; r. 1930–1940); Father of Michael I, King of Romania; Elisabeth, Queen of the Hellenes (1894–1956); Maria, Queen of Yugoslavia (1900–1961); Mother of Peter II, King of Yugoslavia; Prince Nicholas of Romania (1903–1978); Princess Ileana of Romania (1909–1991); Prince Mircea of Romania (1913–1916)
Portrait of Princess Victoria Melita of Saxe-Coburg and Gotha	Princess Victoria Melita of Saxe-Coburg and Gotha	25 November 1876	2 March 1936	Married 1894 (1), Ernest Louis, Grand Duke of Hesse (1868–1937; r. 1892–1918) and had 2 children: Princess Elisabeth of Hesse and by Rhine (1895–1903); Stillborn son (1900)
Portrait of Princess Victoria Melita of Saxe-Coburg and Gotha	Princess Victoria Melita of Saxe-Coburg and Gotha	25 November 1876	2 March 1936	Married 1905 (2), Grand Duke Kirill Vladimirovich of Russia (1876–1938) and 3 children: Grand Duchess Maria Kirillovna of Russia (1907–1951); Grand Duchess Kira Kirillovna of Russia (1909–1967); Grand Duke Vladimir Kirillovich of Russia (1917–1992)
Portrait of Princess Alexandra of Saxe-Coburg and Gotha	Princess Alexandra of Saxe-Coburg and Gotha	1 September 1878	16 April 1942	Married 1896, Ernst II, Prince of Hohenlohe-Langenburg (1863–1950) and had 5 children: Gottfried, Prince of Hohenlohe-Langenburg (1897–1960); Princess Marie-Melita of Hohenlohe-Langenburg (1899–1967); Princess Alexandra of Hohenlohe-Langenburg (1901–1963); Princess Irma of Hohenlohe-Langenburg (1902–1986); Prince Alfred of Hohenlohe-Langenburg (1911)
Coat of arms of Alfred, Duke of Saxe-Coburg and Gotha	Stillborn son	13 October 1879	13 October 1879	
Portrait of Princess Beatrice of Saxe-Coburg and Gotha	Princess Beatrice of Saxe-Coburg and Gotha	20 April 1884	13 July 1966	Married 1909, Infante Alfonso, Duke of Galliera (1886–1975) and had 3 children: Infante Alvaro, Duke of Galliera (1910–1997); Prince Alonso de Orléans (1912–1936); Prince Ataúlfo de Orleans (1913–1974)

=== Children of Helena and Christian ===
Queen Victoria sought a suitable husband for her daughter Princess Helena, eventually choosing Prince Christian of Schleswig-Holstein. Helena, having helped her mother keep up with royal engagements, was able to remain in England with her husband. Defying expectations, Helena and Christian enjoyed a happy marriage that lasted 51 years. In addition, Helena and Christian had six children. However, two of these children died in infancy.

Portrait of Princess Helena's family

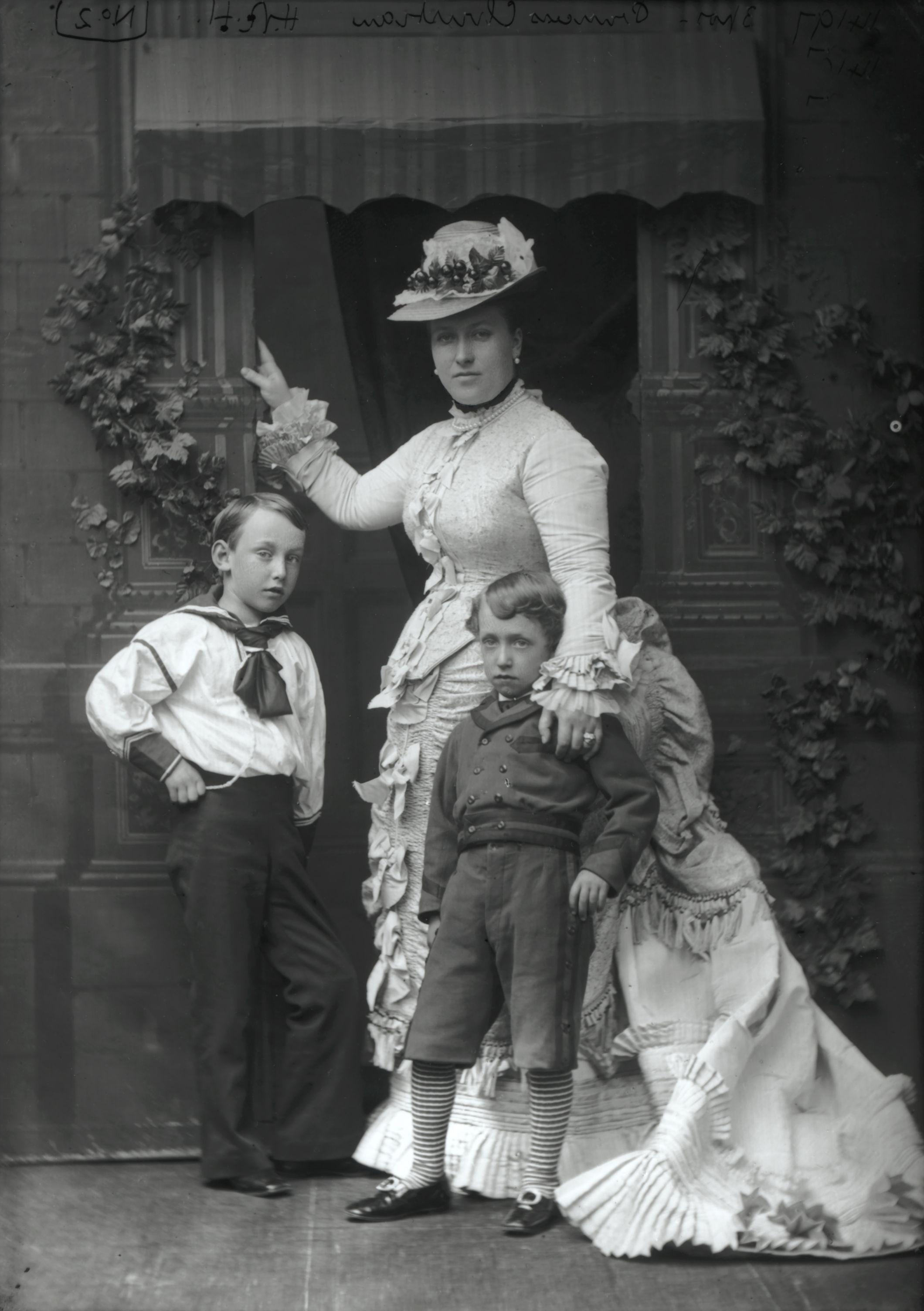
Pictured: Princess Helena of the United Kingdom, Prince Christian Victor of Schleswig-Holstein and Albert, Duke of Schleswig-Holstein

Children of Princess Helena of the United Kingdom
Portrait	Name	Birth	Death	Family
Portrait of Prince Christian Victor of Schleswig-Holstein	Prince Christian Victor of Schleswig-Holstein	14 April 1867	29 October 1900	Never married, no issue.
Portrait of Prince Albert of Schleswig-Holstein	Albert, Duke of Schleswig-Holstein	26 February 1869	27 March 1931	Never married, no issue.
Portrait of Princess Helena Victoria of Schleswig-Holstein	Princess Helena Victoria of Schleswig-Holstein	3 May 1870	8 December 1948	Never married, no issue.
Portrait of Princess Marie Louise of Schleswig-Holstein	Princess Marie Louise of Schleswig-Holstein	12 August 1872	8 December 1956	Married 1891, Prince Aribert of Anhalt (1866–1933) (Note: Marie Louise and Aribert's marriage was annulled in 1900.) and had no children
Portrait of coat of arms of Schleswig-Holstein	Prince Harald of Schleswig-Holstein	12 May 1876	20 May 1876	Died of unknown causes, aged eight days.
Portrait of coat of arms of Schleswig-Holstein	Stillborn son	7 May 1877	7 May 1877	

=== Children of Arthur and Louise Margaret ===
In 1879, Prince Arthur married Princess Louise Margaret of Prussia. They had three children: Margaret, Arthur, and Patricia. Margaret later married Gustaf VI Adolf, and Arthur later served as Governor-General of South Africa. Additionally, Patricia accompanied her father on some of his tours as Governor General of Canada.

Children of Prince Arthur, Duke of Connaught and Strathearn
Portrait	Name	Birth	Death	Family
Portrait of Crown Princess Margaret of Sweden	Princess Margaret of Connaught	15 January 1882	1 May 1920	Married 1905, Gustaf VI Adolf, King of Sweden (1882–1973; r. 1950–1973) and had 5 children: Prince Gustaf Adolf, Duke of Västerbotten (1906–1947); Father of Carl XVI Gustaf, King of Sweden; Prince Sigvard, Duke of Uppland (1907–2002); Ingrid, Queen of Denmark (1910–2000); Mother of Margrethe II, Queen of Denmark, and Anne-Marie, Queen of the Hellenes; Prince Bertil, Duke of Halland (1912–1997); Prince Carl Johan, Duke of Dalarna (1916–2012)
Portrait of Prince Arthur of Connaught	Prince Arthur of Connaught	13 January 1883	12 September 1938	Married 1913, Princess Alexandra, 2nd Duchess of Fife (1891–1959) and had 1 child: Prince Alastair of Connaught (1914–1943)
Portrait of Princess Patricia of Connaught	Princess Patricia of Connaught	17 March 1886	12 January 1974	Married 1919, Alexander Ramsay (1881–1972) and had 1 child: Alexander Ramsay of Mar (1919–2000)

=== Children of Leopold and Helen ===
Feeling restricted by his mother, Queen Victoria, Leopold reasoned that marriage was his best path to independence. Because of Leopold's haemophilia, he struggled to find a suitable wife. Consequently, his mother intervened, suggesting a meeting with Princess Helen of Waldeck and Pyrmont. Leopold and Helen later married in 1882.

Leopold and Helen had two children: Alice and Charles Edward. Charles Edward was born four months after Leopold died of a brain haemorrhage.

Portrait of Prince Leopold's family

Pictured: Prince Leopold, Duke of Albany and Princess Alice, Countess of Athlone

Children of Prince Leopold, Duke of Albany
Portrait	Name	Birth	Death	Family
Portrait of Princess Alice of Albany	Princess Alice of Albany	25 February 1883	3 January 1981	Married 1904, Prince Alexander of Teck (1874–1957) and had 3 children: Princess May of Teck (1906–1994); Prince Rupert of Teck (1907–1928); Prince Maurice of Teck (1910)
Portrait of Duke Charles Edward of Saxe-Coburg and Gotha	Charles Edward, Duke of Saxe-Coburg and Gotha r. 1900–1918	19 July 1884	6 March 1954	Married 1905, Princess Victoria Adelaide of Schleswig-Holstein (1885–1970) and had 5 children: Johann Leopold, Hereditary Prince of Saxe-Coburg and Gotha (1906–1972); Princess Sibylla of Saxe-Coburg and Gotha (1908–1972); Mother of Carl XVI Gustaf, King of Sweden; Prince Hubertus of Saxe-Coburg and Gotha (1909–1943); Princess Caroline Mathilde of Saxe-Coburg and Gotha (1912–1983); Prince Friedrich Josias of Saxe-Coburg and Gotha (1918–1998)

=== Children of Beatrice and Henry ===
In 1884, Beatrice became enamoured with Prince Henry of Battenberg. This strained the relationship with her mother Queen Victoria, as Victoria wanted Beatrice to be her caretaker. However, Victoria later allowed Beatrice to marry Henry, conditioned on Beatrice residing with her. Eventually, Beatrice and Henry wed in 1885.

Beatrice and Henry's four children were born between 1886 and 1891. Also, in 1890, a private suite was built for Beatrice and Henry at Osbourne House. Following her husband's death from malaria in 1896, she resided at Carisbrooke Castle in the summers beginning in 1913.

Portrait of Princess Beatrice's family, 1900

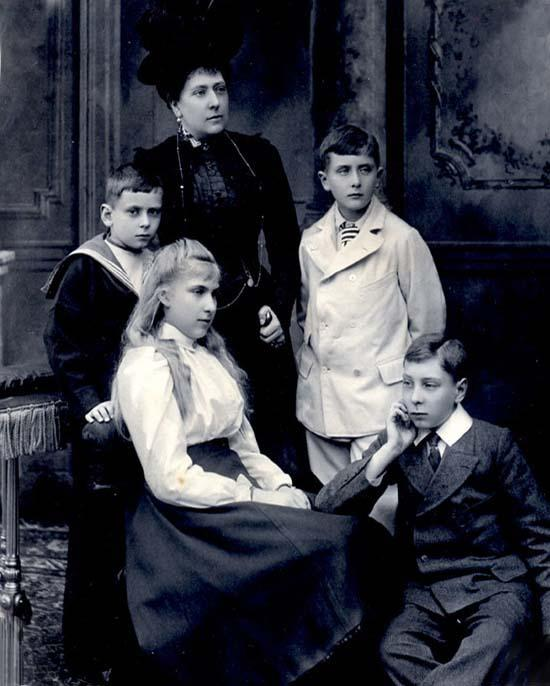
From left to right (standing): Prince Maurice of Battenberg, Princess Beatrice of the United Kingdom and Prince Leopold of Battenberg. Seated: Princess Victoria Eugenie of Battenberg, later Queen of Spain, and Prince Alexander of Battenberg.

Children of Princess Beatrice of the United Kingdom
Portrait	Name	Birth	Death	Family
Portrait of Prince Alexander of Battenberg	Prince Alexander of Battenberg	23 November 1886	23 February 1960	Married 1919, Lady Irene Denison (1890–1956) and had 1 child: Lady Iris Mountbatten (1920–1982)
Portrait of Queen Victoria Eugenie of Spain	Princess Victoria Eugenie of Battenberg	24 October 1887	15 April 1969	Married 1906, Alfonso XIII, King of Spain (1886–1941; r. 1886–1931) and had 7 children: Alfonso, Prince of Asturias (1907–1938); Infante Jaime, Duke of Segovia (1908–1975); Infanta Beatriz of Spain (1909–2002); A son (1910); Infanta Maria Cristina of Spain (1911–1996); Infante Juan, Count of Barcelona (1913–1993); Father of Juan Carlos I, King of Spain; Infante Gonzalo of Spain (1914–1934)
Portrait of Prince Leopold of Battenberg	Prince Leopold of Battenberg	21 May 1889	23 April 1922	Never married, no issue.
Portrait of Prince Maurice of Battenberg	Prince Maurice of Battenberg	3 October 1891	27 October 1914	Never married, no issue.

== See also ==
- Descendants of Charles I of England
- Descendants of George III
- Descendants of Christian IX of Denmark, describes progeny of one of Queen Victoria's contemporaries
  - Royal descendants of Queen Victoria and of King Christian IX
- Descendants of George V
- Descendants of Elizabeth II
- Haemophilia in European royalty, a medical condition that affected multiple descendants of Queen Victoria
- John William Friso, the most recent ancestor of all sovereigns of currently existing hereditary European monarchies until 2022
- Legitimacy of Queen Victoria
- Louis IX of Hesse-Darmstadt, the most recent ancestor of all sovereigns of currently existing hereditary European monarchies since 2022
