= Descendants of George V =

Progeny of British king

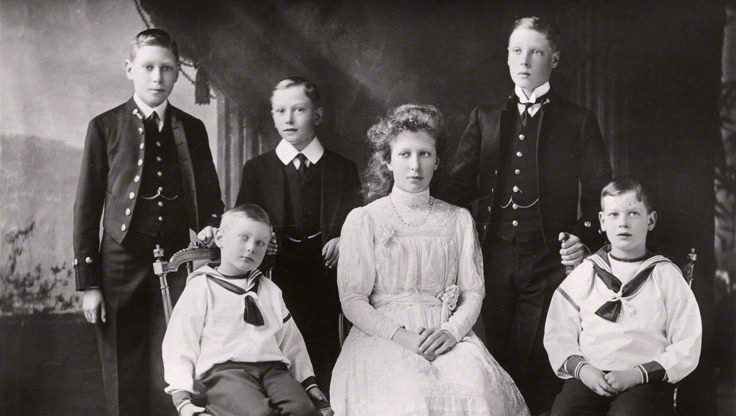
1910 portrait of George V's children

George V (3 June 1865 – 20 January 1936) reigned in the United Kingdom from 1910 to 1936. He and his queen consort, Mary of Teck (26 May 1867 – 24 March 1953), had six children and nine grandchildren.

Shortly after the death of George's older brother, Prince Albert Victor, he married Princess Victoria Mary of Teck in 1893. The couple lived in York Cottage prior to George's accession to the throne.

Four of George and Mary's six children had progeny of their own. Two of their sons, Edward VIII and George VI, became King of the United Kingdom themselves, and their granddaughter Elizabeth II also became British monarch.

== Background ==
=== King George V ===
The second son of Edward VII and Alexandra of Denmark, George served in the Royal Navy from 1877 to 1892. Following the death of his older brother, Albert Victor, in 1892, George married Mary and settled down at York Cottage, where they resided for 33 years.

After the death of George's grandmother, Queen Victoria, in 1901, his father Edward prepared him to reign as King of the United Kingdom. Edward dispatched George on tours of Europe and the British Empire. George later remarked that he was at unease with this role. However, upon the death of Edward in 1910, George noted, "I have lost my best friend and the best of fathers."

In the first few years of George V's reign, from 1910 to 1914, he navigated multiple political crises, including the refusal of the House of Lords to pass a bill limiting its powers and the Irish Home Rule movement. In addition, during World War I, George visited troops and kept up morale. Anti-German sentiment prompted George to change his family name from Saxe-Coburg and Gotha to Windsor.

After World War I, George accepted the first Labour Party government in 1924 and played a conciliatory role in the 1926 United Kingdom general strike. Concluding George's reign, his Silver Jubilee in 1935 saw much popular affection expressed for him.

=== Queen Mary ===
The daughter of Francis, Duke of Teck, and Princess Mary Adelaide of Cambridge, Mary was raised in a family that lived beyond their means. Consequently, Mary's marriage prospects were limited. Nevertheless, in 1891, Queen Victoria and the future Edward VII considered Mary a suitable match for George's oldest brother, Albert Victor. Following Albert Victor's death from influenza in 1892, Mary and George became close and eventually married in 1893.

Following their marriage, Mary accompanied George on his international tours, including a visit to the British Raj in 1905 and 1906. During World War I, Mary raised money and supported troops, even visiting the Western Front in 1917. She also supported George through the 1926 United Kingdom general strike and his health problems.

After her husband's death in 1936, Mary supported her son, George VI, in his duties as King of the United Kingdom. She actively involved herself in the upbringing of George VI's daughters, the future Elizabeth II and Margaret. Moreover, during World War II, Mary collected supplies for the war effort and visited troops.

=== Marriage ===
George and Mary were married in 1893.

Family of George V, King of the United Kingdom
Portrait	Name	Birth	Death	Descendants
Portrait of King George V	George V, King of the United Kingdom r. 1910–1936	3 June 1865	20 January 1936	6 children, including: Edward VIII, King of the United Kingdom; George VI, King of the United Kingdom
Portrait of Queen Mary of the United Kingdom	Princess Victoria Mary of Teck	26 May 1867	24 March 1953	6 children, including: Edward VIII, King of the United Kingdom; George VI, King of the United Kingdom

== Children ==
George V, Mary, and their family lived a simple and secluded life at York Cottage. They raised their children with some severity, unable or unwilling to show much affection. Historian Alexandra Churchill has noted that contrary to popular belief, George was more of a hands-on father than his contemporaries.

George and Mary's youngest son, John, was kept out of the public eye. John had epilepsy and potentially Asperger syndrome. Also, John disregarded protocols, which his parents struggled to manage. George was concerned about his son Edward in his later years due to his affairs. George remarked, "After I am dead, the boy [Edward] will ruin himself in twelve months."

Children of George V, King of the United Kingdom
Portrait	Name	Birth	Death	Family
Portrait of King Edward VIII	Edward VIII, King of the United Kingdom r. 1936	23 June 1894	28 May 1972	Married 1937, Wallis Simpson (1896–1986)
Portrait of King George VI	George VI, King of the United Kingdom r. 1936–1952	14 December 1895	6 February 1952	Married 1923, Elizabeth Bowes-Lyon (1900–2002) 2 children (including Elizabeth II, Queen of the United Kingdom)
Portrait of Mary, Princess Royal and Countess of Harewood	Mary, Princess Royal	25 April 1897	28 March 1965	Married 1922, Henry Lascelles, 6th Earl of Harewood (1882–1947) 2 children
Portrait of Prince Henry, Duke of Gloucester	Prince Henry, Duke of Gloucester	31 March 1900	10 June 1974	Married 1935, Alice Montagu Douglas Scott (1901–2004) 2 children
Portrait of Prince George, Duke of Kent	Prince George, Duke of Kent	20 December 1902	25 August 1942	Married 1934, Princess Marina of Greece and Denmark (1906–1968) 3 children
Portrait of Prince John of the United Kingdom	Prince John of the United Kingdom	12 July 1905	18 January 1919	

== Grandchildren ==
=== Children of George VI and Elizabeth ===
George became romantically interested in Lady Elizabeth Bowes-Lyon, the daughter of Claude Bowes-Lyon, 14th Earl of Strathmore. Although Elizabeth initially rejected his marriage proposals, they eventually wed in 1923.

George and Elizabeth's first daughter, Princess Elizabeth of York (later Elizabeth II), was born in 1926. Princess Elizabeth was raised at 145 Piccadilly, where she had two nurseries. Princess Elizabeth spent a lot of time with her grandparents, including as her parents embarked on a royal tour of Australia. Moreover, Alexandra Ogilvy, Countess of Airlie, explained that Princess Elizabeth came first in the affections of her paternal grandfather, George V.

In 1930, Queen Elizabeth gave birth to her second daughter, Margaret, at Glamis Castle. Subsequently, George and Queen Elizabeth's family was identified as an aspirational ideal. The two were not a part of the jet set of London, instead centering their lives on their children. Following the abdication of Edward VIII, George VI's brother, the latter's family moved into Buckingham Palace.

During World War II, George and Queen Elizabeth insisted on staying in London throughout The Blitz. Moreover, their daughters were evacuated to Windsor, despite proposals to safely relocate them to Canada. Regarding the latter decision, Queen Elizabeth explained, "[Princesses Elizabeth and Margaret] would never leave without me and I couldn't leave without the king, and the king will never leave."

Children of George VI, King of the United Kingdom
Portrait	Name	Birth	Death	Family
Portrait of Queen Elizabeth II	Elizabeth II, Queen of the United Kingdom r. 1952–2022	21 April 1926	8 September 2022	Married 1947, Philip Mountbatten (1921–2021) and had 4 children: Charles III, King of the United Kingdom (born 1948; r. 2022–present); Anne, Princess Royal (born 1950); Andrew Mountbatten-Windsor (born 1960); Prince Edward, Duke of Edinburgh (born 1964)
Portrait of Princess Margaret of the United Kingdom	Princess Margaret of the United Kingdom	21 August 1930	9 February 2002	Married 1960, Antony Armstrong-Jones (1930–2017) (Note: Margaret and Antony divorced in 1978.) and had 2 children: David Armstrong-Jones, 2nd Earl of Snowdon (born 1961); Lady Sarah Armstrong-Jones (born 1964)

=== Children of Mary and Henry ===
Mary's marriage to Henry Lascelles, 6th Earl of Harewood, stood the test of time, with Mary left "utterly bereft" upon her husband's death in 1947. They resided at Harewood House. Upon Mary's marriage, biographer Elisabeth Basford noted that she could have retired from public life and lived as an affluent aristocratic wife. However, Mary's strong sense of duty ensured that she continued public engagements for the next 40 years.

Mary and Henry had two children. The marriage of their youngest son, George, to concert pianist Marion Stein ended in divorce when George had a love child with Patricia Tuckwell.

Children of Mary, Princess Royal and Countess of Harewood
Name	Birth	Death	Family
George Lascelles, 7th Earl of Harewood	7 February 1923	11 July 2011	Married 1949 (1), Marion Stein (1926–2014) (Note: George and Marion divorced in 1967.) and had 3 children: David Lascelles, 8th Earl of Harewood (born 1950); James Lascelles (born 1953); Jeremy Lascelles (born 1955)
George Lascelles, 7th Earl of Harewood	7 February 1923	11 July 2011	Married 1967 (2), Patricia Tuckwell (1926–2018) and had 1 child: Mark Lascelles (born 1964)
Gerald Lascelles	21 August 1924	27 February 1998	Married 1952 (1), Angela Dowding (1919–2007) (Note: Gerald and Angela divorced in 1978.) and had 1 child: Henry Lascelles (born 1953)
Gerald Lascelles	21 August 1924	27 February 1998	Married 1978 (2), Elizabeth Collingwood (1924–2006) and had 1 child: Martin Lascelles (born 1962)

=== Children of Henry and Alice ===
In 1935, Henry married Lady Alice Montagu Douglas Scott. They had two children: William and Richard. During World War II, Henry visited troops and toured multiple British defences, including to Gibraltar in 1941 and 1942. Also, Alice visited hospitals during the Second World War.

In 1943, Australian Prime Minister John Curtin announced that Henry had been chosen to serve as Governor-General of Australia. Henry and Alice arrived in Australia in 1945. He was subsequently sworn in on 30 January 1945, serving as Governor-General for two years. Henry and Alice joined Victory in Europe Day and Victory over Japan Day celebrations in Australia. Moreover, their two children were popular with the Australian public.

Children of Prince Henry, Duke of Gloucester
Portrait	Name	Birth	Death	Family
Portrait of Prince William of Gloucester	Prince William of Gloucester	18 December 1941	28 August 1972	
Portrait of Prince Richard, Duke of Gloucester	Prince Richard, Duke of Gloucester	26 August 1944	Living	Married 1972, Birgitte van Deurs Henriksen (born 1946) and had 3 children: Alexander Windsor, Earl of Ulster (born 1974); Lady Davina Windsor (born 1977); Lady Rose Windsor (born 1980)

=== Children of George and Marina ===
In 1934, George married Princess Marina of Greece and Denmark. They had three children: Edward, Alexandra and Michael. Also, George served as a personal naval aide-de-camp to his brother, George VI.

Children of Prince George, Duke of Kent
Portrait	Name	Birth	Family
Portrait of Prince Edward, Duke of Kent	Prince Edward, Duke of Kent	9 October 1935	Married 1961, Katharine Worsley (1933–2025) and had 3 children: George Windsor, Earl of St Andrews (born 1962); Lady Helen Windsor (born 1964); Lord Nicholas Windsor (born 1970)
Portrait of Princess Alexandra of Kent	Princess Alexandra of Kent	25 December 1936	Married 1963, Angus Ogilvy (1928–2004) and had 2 children: James Ogilvy (born 1964); Marina Ogilvy (born 1966)
Portrait of Prince Michael of Kent	Prince Michael of Kent	4 July 1942	Married 1978, Marie-Christine von Reibnitz (born 1945) and had 2 children: Lord Frederick Windsor (born 1979); Lady Gabriella Windsor (born 1981)

== See also ==
- Descendants of Charles I of England
- Descendants of George III
- Descendants of Queen Victoria
- Descendants of Elizabeth II
- Family tree of British monarchs
