= Descendants of Elizabeth II =

Progeny of British queen

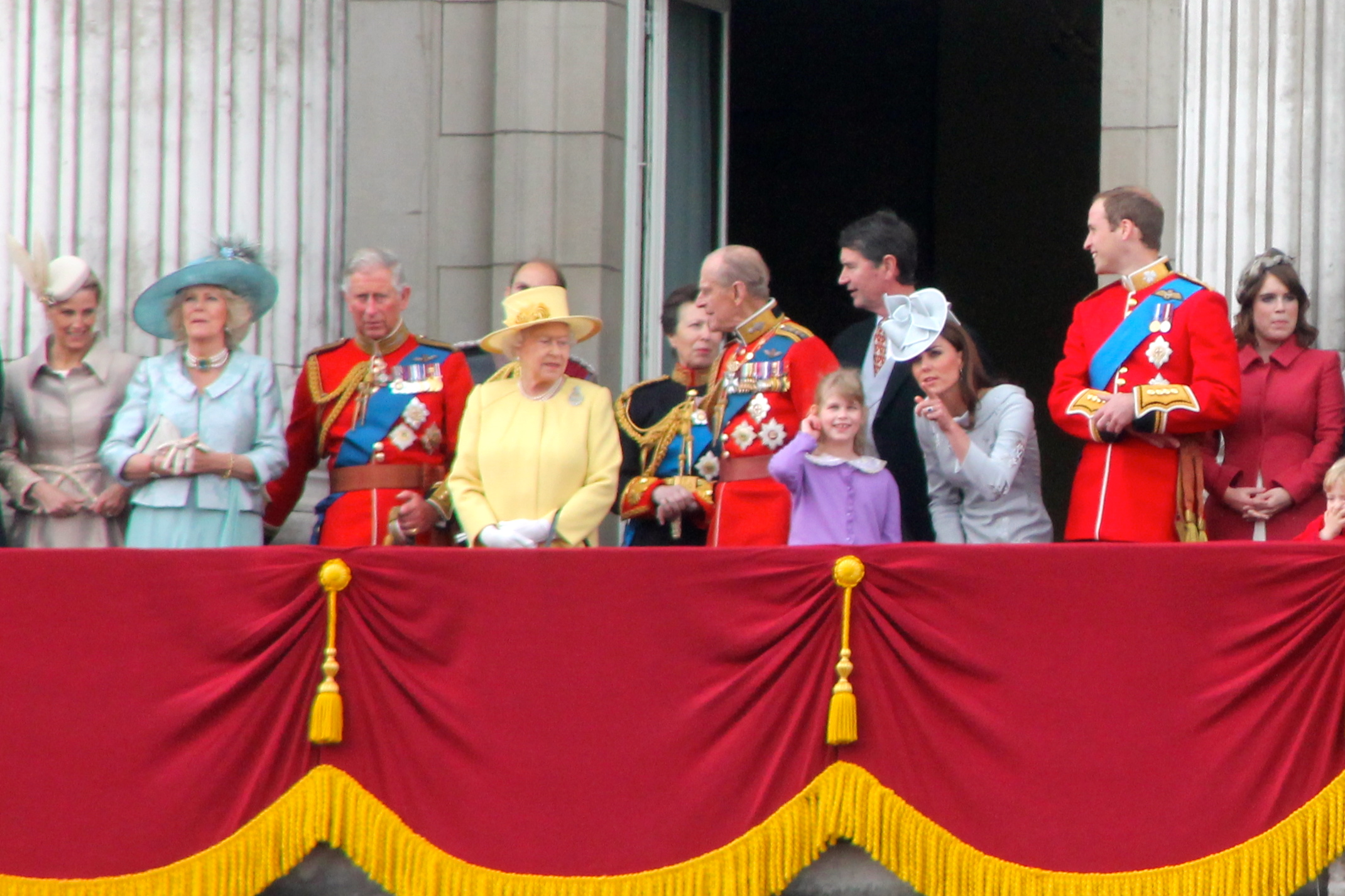
Elizabeth II surrounded by her principal descendants and their spouses, 2012

Elizabeth II (21 April 1926 – 8 September 2022) was Queen of the United Kingdom from 1952 to 2022. She and her husband, Prince Philip, Duke of Edinburgh (10 June 1921 – 9 April 2021), had four children, eight grandchildren, and fifteen great-grandchildren.

Married in November 1947, the couple lived at Clarence House and in Villa Guardamangia, Malta, prior to Elizabeth's accession to the throne.

All four of Elizabeth and Philip's children have children and descendants of their own. Their son Charles III became King of the United Kingdom, and their grandson William, Prince of Wales is the British heir apparent.

== Background ==
=== Queen Elizabeth II ===
The daughter of George VI and Elizabeth Bowes-Lyon, Elizabeth and her sister, Margaret, were raised by multiple governesses at 145 Piccadilly. Following the outbreak of World War II, Elizabeth and Margaret were relocated to Windsor Castle. In the last year of the Second World War, Elizabeth served in the Women's Auxiliary Territorial Service.

In 1951, as the health of her father, George VI, deteriorated, Elizabeth began to assume more ceremonial duties. On 6 February 1952, Elizabeth II became Queen of the United Kingdom upon her father's death. One year later, she participated in her coronation at Westminster Abbey on 2 June 1953. During Elizabeth's reign, various political and societal changes occurred in the United Kingdom, including the decline in the authority of the Church of England, the end of the Cold War, and the rise of multiculturalism.

Elizabeth died in 2022 at Balmoral Castle.

=== Prince Philip ===
The only son of Prince Andrew of Greece and Denmark and Princess Alice of Battenberg, Philip was educated at Cheam School, Schule Schloss Salem, and Gordonstoun School. He joined the Royal Navy in 1939, later serving with distinction during World War II and becoming a lieutenant.

In 1939, Philip escorted Elizabeth and her sister Margaret around Britannia Royal Naval College Dartmouth. Shortly afterwards, Elizabeth and Philip began exchanging correspondence. On 10 July 1947, their engagement was announced. Elizabeth and Philip later married on 20 November 1947.

As Elizabeth's consort, Philip provided her companionship and moral support. He accompanied Elizabeth on her state visits and royal tours within the United Kingdom. In addition, Philip was associated with approximately 1,000 organisations that supported various causes, including young people, nature conservation, and sports.

Philip died in 2021 at Windsor Castle.

=== Marriage ===
Elizabeth and Philip were married in 1947. Following their wedding ceremony, they spent their honeymoon at Broadlands. Elizabeth and Philip later resided at Clarence House until she became Queen of the United Kingdom in 1952. Moreover, they resided at Villa Guardamangia during Philip's naval posting to Malta.

Family of Elizabeth II, Queen of the United Kingdom
Portrait	Name	Birth	Death	Descendants
Portrait of Queen Elizabeth II	Elizabeth II, Queen of the United Kingdom r. 1952–2022	21 April 1926	8 September 2022	4 children, including: Charles III, King of the United Kingdom
Portrait of Prince Philip of the United Kingdom	Prince Philip, Duke of Edinburgh	10 June 1921	9 April 2021	4 children, including: Charles III, King of the United Kingdom

== Children ==
Elizabeth II and Philip sought to instil notions of duty and hard work into their four children. Their three sons, Charles, Andrew and Edward, all attended Gordonstoun School, (Note: "For the three boys [(the future) Charles III, Andrew and Edward], their training began with attendance at Gordonstoun School, a public (fee-paying) school in the Scottish Highlands ... Philip had himself been at the school.") which their father had also attended. Charles and Edward went on to study at the University of Cambridge. Also, all three sons served in the British Armed Forces. Charles and Andrew trained in the Royal Navy, whereas Edward trained in the Royal Marines.

Neither Charles nor his sister, Anne, travelled with their parents in their childhood. Nevertheless, according to Anne, Philip tried to spend time with Charles and her before bedtime, giving them time to read or play. During his youth, Charles was sensitive and responded badly to criticism. Conversely, Anne was confident with an outgoing personality during her youth.

Children of Elizabeth II, Queen of the United Kingdom
Portrait	Name	Birth	Family
Portrait of King Charles III	Charles III, King of the United Kingdom r. 2022–present	14 November 1948	Married 1981, Diana Spencer (1961–1997) (Note: Charles and Diana divorced in 1996.) 2 children
Portrait of King Charles III	Charles III, King of the United Kingdom r. 2022–present	14 November 1948	Married 2005, Camilla Parker Bowles (born 1947)
Portrait of Princess Anne of the United Kingdom	Anne, Princess Royal	15 August 1950	Married 1973, Mark Phillips (born 1948) (Note: Anne and Mark divorced in 1992.) 2 children
Portrait of Princess Anne of the United Kingdom	Anne, Princess Royal	15 August 1950	Married 1992, Timothy Laurence (born 1955)
Portrait of Andrew Mountbatten-Windsor	Andrew Mountbatten-Windsor	19 February 1960	Married 1986, Sarah Ferguson (born 1959) (Note: Andrew and Sarah divorced in 1996.) 2 children
Portrait of Prince Edward, Duke of Edinburgh	Prince Edward, Duke of Edinburgh	10 March 1964	Married 1999, Sophie Rhys-Jones (born 1965) 2 children

== Grandchildren ==
=== Children of Charles and Diana ===
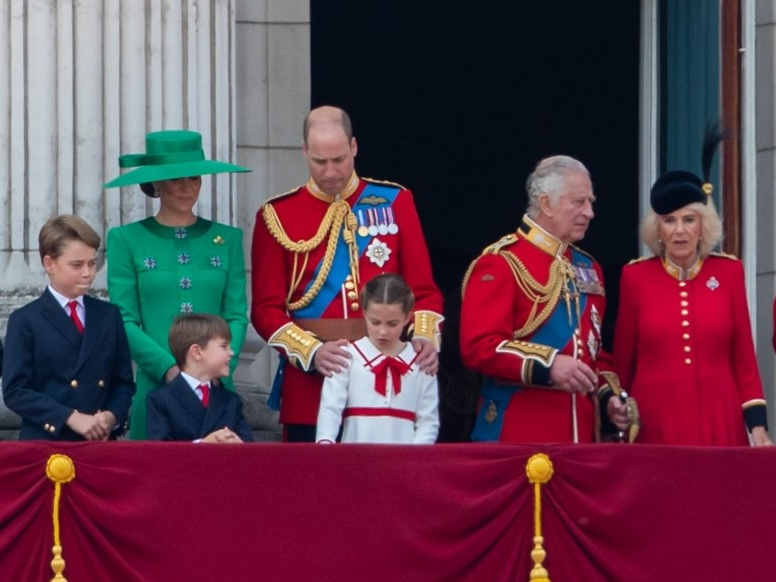
Charles III (second from right) surrounded by his immediate family in 2023

In November 1977, Prince Charles met Lady Diana Spencer for the first time. Three years later, in 1980, their relationship became more intimate following a conversation involving Charles's late granduncle, Louis Mountbatten, 1st Earl Mountbatten of Burma. (Note: Mountbatten was assassinated in 1979.) Diana was subsequently invited to Balmoral Castle, where Charles's family took interest in her. On 24 February 1981, Charles and Diana announced their engagement. They subsequently married on 29 July 1981.

Charles and Diana became the parents of two boys, William and Harry, who were known as the heir and spare, respectively. Diana raised their children in an atypical manner for British royal children. For example, she chose William and Harry's schools, personally taking them to school as often as possible. Diana remarked that Charles wanted their children to be raised by governesses, which she disagreed with because she wanted them to experience the real world. Also, Diana took William with her on a royal tour of Australia with Charles in 1983. Furthermore, Diana brought William and Harry to Thorpe Park and fast food restaurants, including KFC.

Contrary to perceptions that Charles was absent around his sons, the former was hugely present in the daily lives of the latter at Kensington Palace. Charles shared breakfast with and engaged in horseplay with William and Harry. In addition, Charles introduced his sons to fox hunting, fly fishing, and polo matches. Nevertheless, according to some royal biographers, William later expressed that Charles put duty before parenthood.

Due to various factors, Charles and Diana's marriage deteriorated within 5 years. Charles engaged in an affair with his former girlfriend Camilla Parker Bowles. (Note: Charles and Camilla eventually married in 2005.) Tapes that recorded intimate conversations between Charles and Camilla first made headlines in November 1992, with transcripts of the conversations published in January 1993. In turn, Diana, deprived of emotional support from Charles, engaged in her own affairs, including with James Hewitt. (Note: In the Squidgygate scandal, tapes of conversations between Diana and James Gilbey, from another affair of the former, became public.) Combined with the age difference between Charles and Diana, his affair with Camilla caused the collapse of his marriage to Diana. Charles and Diana separated in December 1992 and eventually divorced in July 1996.

Charles and Diana have five grandchildren: George, Charlotte, Louis, Archie and Lilibet. Upon becoming a grandfather in 2013, Charles remarked that it was a different part of his life. Also, Charles stated that "the great thing is to encourage them [his grandchildren], show them things that take their interest", noting that his own grandmother had provided him those experiences.

Due to the high number of royal engagements that Charles undertook, he was initially less actively involved in the lives of George and Charlotte than their maternal grandparents, Michael and Carole Middleton. Nevertheless, Charles expressed that he was extremely thankful to have grandchildren. Moreover, William has noted that despite doting on both George and Charlotte, Charles was "positively obsessed" with the latter.

After Louis's birth, Charles became more involved in the lives of his grandchildren. He installed recreational equipment at Highgrove House for George, Charlotte and Louis. In addition, Charles has used a tactile grandparenting style with William's children, including embracing them and showing them the plants and farm animals of Highgrove House. In a 2018 BBC documentary marking Charles's 70th birthday, Camilla described that he "will get down on his knees and crawl about with them [grandchildren] for hours". William remarked in the same documentary that his father is "brilliant" with his three grandchildren, though he also expressed a wish for his father to spend even more time with them.

Despite familial tensions, Harry has expressed a desire for Archie and Lilibet to have relationships with other members of the British royal family. During the Platinum Jubilee of Elizabeth II in June 2022, Charles met Lilibet for the first time.

Children of Charles III, King of the United Kingdom
Portrait	Name	Birth	Family
Portrait of Prince William	William, Prince of Wales	21 June 1982	Married 2011, Catherine Middleton (born 1982) and has 3 children: Prince George of Wales (born 2013); Princess Charlotte of Wales (born 2015); Prince Louis of Wales (born 2018)
Portrait of Prince Harry	Prince Harry, Duke of Sussex	15 September 1984	Married 2018, Meghan Markle (born 1981) and has 2 children: Prince Archie of Sussex (born 2019); Princess Lilibet of Sussex (born 2021)

=== Children of Anne and Mark ===
In 1968, Princess Anne met Mark Phillips in Mexico City. Despite unfavourable impressions of Mark from Elizabeth II, Philip, and Charles, Mark proposed to Anne in May 1973, and the two married on 14 November 1973. Anne and Mark had two children: Peter and Zara. Neither Peter nor Zara, who both grew up at Gatcombe Park, was given royal titles. Moreover, Zara has expressed gratitude for not receiving a royal title.

Shortly after Anne gave birth to Zara, Anne and Mark began to become more emotionally distant in their relationship. In 1985, Mark was named in a paternity suit as the father of a child from an affair. Ultimately, Anne and Mark separated in 1989. They divorced in 1992.

Children of Anne, Princess Royal
Portrait	Name	Birth	Family
Portrait of Peter Phillips	Peter Phillips	15 November 1977	Married 2008, Autumn Kelly (born 1978) (Note: Peter and Autumn divorced in 2021.) and has 2 children: Savannah Phillips (born 2010); Isla Phillips (born 2012)
Portrait of Peter Phillips	Peter Phillips	15 November 1977	Married 2026, Harriet Sperling (born 1980)
Portrait of Zara Tindall	Zara Phillips	15 May 1981	Married 2011, Mike Tindall (born 1978) and has 3 children: Mia Tindall (born 2014); Lena Tindall (born 2018); Lucas Tindall (born 2021)

=== Children of Andrew and Sarah ===
In 1985, Andrew met Sarah Ferguson at Windsor Castle. (Note: Andrew and Sarah had previously met as children.) In March 1986, they announced their engagement, eventually marrying on 23 July 1986. Andrew and Sarah had two children: Beatrice and Eugenie. Growing up, Beatrice and Eugenie attended Christmas services at St Mary Magdalene Church, Sandringham, and the Royal Ascot with the rest of the British royal family.

Andrew and Sarah separated in 1992, followed by their divorce in 1996. Nevertheless, they have maintained an amicable relationship.

Children of Andrew Mountbatten-Windsor
Portrait	Name	Birth	Family
Portrait of Princess Beatrice	Princess Beatrice	8 August 1988	Married 2020, Edoardo Mapelli Mozzi (born 1983) and has 2 children: Sienna Mapelli Mozzi (born 2021); Athena Mapelli Mozzi (born 2025)
Portrait of Princess Eugenie	Princess Eugenie	23 March 1990	Married 2018, Jack Brooksbank (born 1986) and has 3 children: August Philip Hawke Brooksbank (born 2021); Ernest George Ronnie Brooksbank (born 2023); Adelaide Elizabeth Annina Brooksbank (born 2026)

=== Children of Edward and Sophie ===
Contrary to speculation that Edward would remain unmarried, Prince Edward wed Sophie Rhys-Jones on 19 June 1999. Edward and Sophie had met at a real tennis event in 1993, and they announced their engagement in January 1999.

Edward and Sophie have two children: Louise and James. Sophie prematurely gave birth to Louise, which resulted in her having esotropia. Moreover, Edward and Sophie have opted not to style Louise and James as a British princess and British prince, respectively, raising them with the understanding that they will work for a living.

Children of Prince Edward, Duke of Edinburgh
Portrait	Name	Birth
Portrait of Lady Louise Windsor	Lady Louise Mountbatten-Windsor	8 November 2003
Portrait of James, Earl of Wessex	James Mountbatten-Windsor, Earl of Wessex	17 December 2007

== See also ==
- Descendants of Charles I of England
- Descendants of George III
- Descendants of Queen Victoria
- Descendants of George V
- Family tree of British monarchs
- Mountbatten-Windsor
