= Descendants of George III =

Progeny of British king

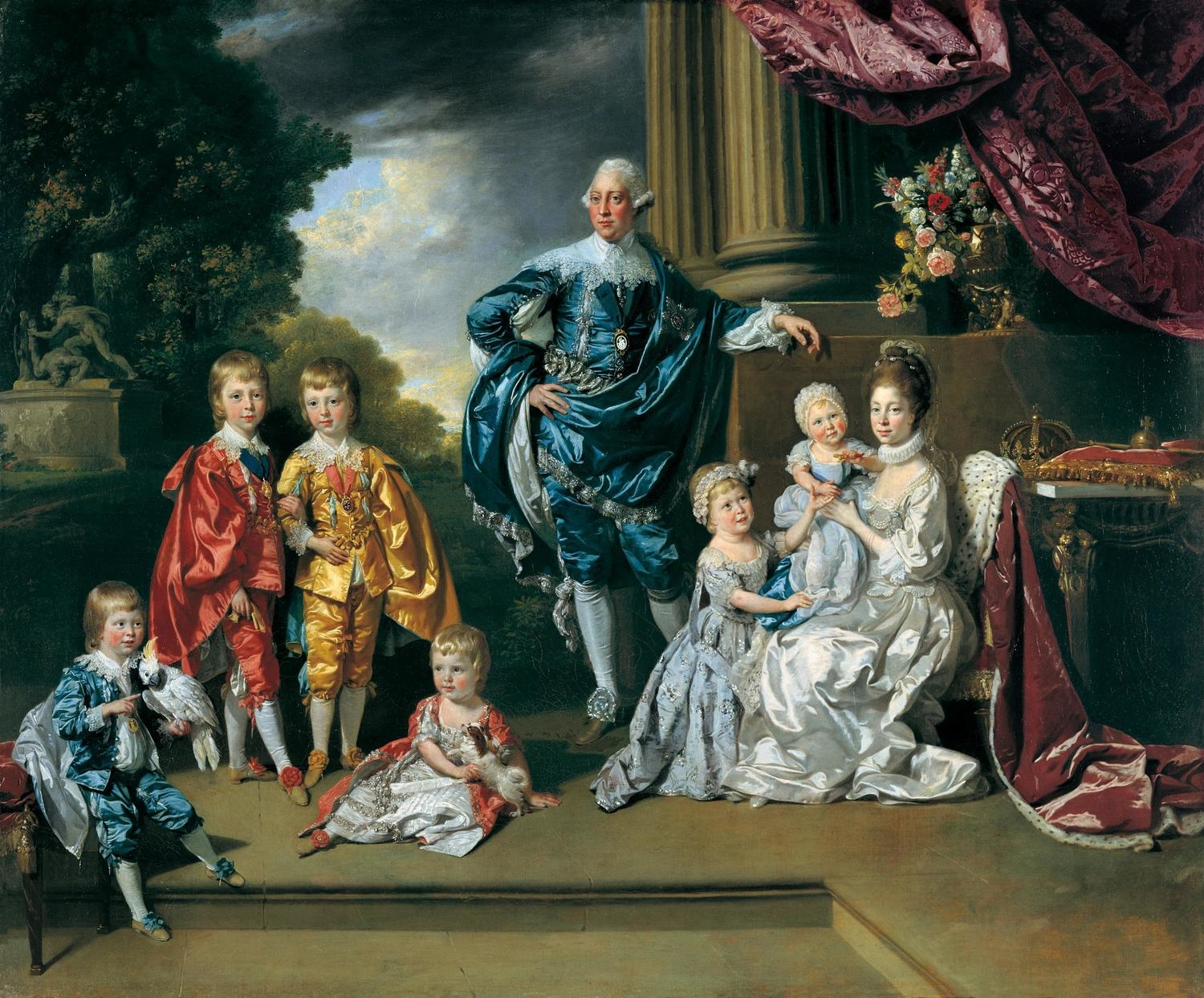
1770 portrait of George III and his family by Johan Zoffany

King George III (4 June 1738 – 29 January 1820) ruled Great Britain and the United Kingdom from 1760 to 1820. He and his queen consort, Charlotte of Mecklenburg-Strelitz (19 May 1744 – 17 November 1818), became the ancestors of fifteen children and nine legitimate grandchildren. (Note: This article excludes stillborn and illegitimate progeny of George III and Charlotte.)

Shortly after becoming King of Great Britain in 1761, George married Charlotte. He became deeply devoted to Charlotte, purchasing Queen's House (later Buckingham Palace) for her. Charlotte loved Queen's House, giving birth to 14 of her children there. Later, George would become disappointed in his sons.

Five of George and Charlotte's children would go on to have legitimate progeny of their own. Three of their sons, George IV, William IV, and Ernest Augustus, King of Hanover, became monarchs themselves. Moreover, two of their legitimate grandchildren, Victoria and George V, would become sovereigns of the United Kingdom and Hanover, respectively.

== Background ==
=== King George III ===
The eldest son of Frederick, Prince of Wales, and Princess Augusta of Saxe-Gotha, George was the first British House of Hanover monarch to speak English as his first language. In 1751, he became the heir to the British throne upon the death of his father, later succeeding his grandfather George II in 1760.

The first 25 years of George's reign were politically controversial for multiple reasons. First, the American Revolutionary War threatened his throne in Hanover. In addition, George was accused of unconstitutionally reasserting royal authority, despite being careful not to exceed his prerogative. His lack of political subtlety made it difficult for him to work with Parliament.

During his reign, George also founded the Royal Academy of Arts and took a keen interest in agriculture.

In the 1780s, the political aftermath of the American Revolutionary War and family anxieties began to impact George's mental health. In 1810, his mental health condition became permanent, impeding his ability to rule. For the last decade of George III's reign, his son George, Prince of Wales (later George IV), acted on his behalf as prince regent. Eventually, George, Prince of Wales, succeeded his father in 1820.

=== Queen Charlotte ===
The youngest daughter of Duke Charles Louis Frederick of Mecklenburg and Princess Elisabeth Albertine of Saxe-Hildburghausen, Charlotte was raised in Mirow, Holy Roman Empire. In July 1761, George III announced his intent to marry Charlotte. The two were later married at St James's Palace on 8 September 1761, and on 22 September 1761, George and Charlotte participated in their coronation.

As queen consort, Charlotte was an enthusiast of music, preferring German composers such as George Frideric Handel. In addition, Charlotte was interested in botany, specifically taking a great interest in Kew Gardens.

In 1818, Charlotte died in the presence of her eldest son, George, Prince Regent (later George IV).

=== Marriage ===
George and Charlotte were married in 1761.

Family of George III, King of the United Kingdom
Portrait	Name	Birth	Death	Descendants
Portrait of King George III	George III, King of the United Kingdom r. 1760–1820	4 June 1738	29 January 1820	15 children, including: George IV, King of the United Kingdom; William IV, King of the United Kingdom; Charlotte, Queen of Württemberg; Ernest Augustus, King of Hanover
Portrait of Queen Charlotte	Charlotte of Mecklenburg-Strelitz	19 May 1744	17 November 1818	15 children, including: George IV, King of the United Kingdom; William IV, King of the United Kingdom; Charlotte, Queen of Württemberg; Ernest Augustus, King of Hanover

== Children ==
Throughout their marriage, George III and Charlotte had 15 children, 13 of whom reached adulthood. George was a devoted husband to Charlotte, buying her the Queen's House (later Buckingham Palace).

Charlotte enjoyed her time at the Queen's House, giving birth to 14 of her children there. In addition, she purchased Frogmore Cottage as a retreat for both herself and her daughters. Charlotte was also concerned about the welfare and education of her daughters.

George was a fond father, especially of his daughters. However, he became disappointed in his sons. Because of the unsuitable marriages George's brothers made, he passed the Royal Marriages Act 1772. In addition, George rejected many marriage offers involving his daughters.

Children of George III, King of the United Kingdom
Portrait	Name	Birth	Death	Family
Portrait of King George IV	George IV, King of the United Kingdom r. 1820–1830	12 August 1762	26 June 1830	Married 1795, Caroline of Brunswick (1768–1821) 1 child
Portrait of Prince Frederick, Duke of York and Albany	Prince Frederick, Duke of York and Albany	16 August 1763	5 January 1827	Married 1791, Princess Frederica Charlotte of Prussia (1767–1820)
Portrait of King William IV	William IV, King of the United Kingdom r. 1830–1837	21 August 1765	20 June 1837	Married 1818, Adelaide of Saxe-Meiningen (1792–1849) 2 children
Portrait of Charlotte, Princess Royal	Charlotte, Princess Royal	29 September 1766	6 August 1828	Married 1797, Frederick I, King of Württemberg (1754–1816)
Portrait of Prince Edward, Duke of Kent and Strathearn	Prince Edward, Duke of Kent and Strathearn	2 November 1767	23 January 1820	Married 1818, Princess Victoria of Saxe-Coburg-Saalfeld (1786–1861) 1 child (Victoria, Queen of the United Kingdom)
Portrait of Princess Augusta Sophia of the United Kingdom	Princess Augusta Sophia of the United Kingdom	8 November 1768	22 September 1840	
Portrait of Princess Elizabeth of the United Kingdom	Princess Elizabeth of the United Kingdom	22 May 1770	10 January 1840	Married 1818, Frederick VI, Landgrave of Hesse-Homburg (1769–1829)
Portrait of King Ernest Augustus of Hanover	Ernest Augustus, King of Hanover r. 1837–1851	5 June 1771	18 November 1851	Married 1815, Frederica of Mecklenburg-Strelitz (1778–1841) 1 child (George V, King of Hanover)
Portrait of Prince Augustus Frederick, Duke of Sussex	Prince Augustus Frederick, Duke of Sussex	27 January 1773	21 April 1843	Married 1793, Lady Augusta Murray (1761–1830) (Note: Augustus Frederick and Augusta's marriage was illegal.)
Portrait of Prince Augustus Frederick, Duke of Sussex	Prince Augustus Frederick, Duke of Sussex	27 January 1773	21 April 1843	Married 1831, Lady Cecilia Underwood (c. 1785 – 1873) (Note: Augustus Frederick and Cecilia's marriage was illegal.)
Portrait of Prince Adolphus, Duke of Cambridge	Prince Adolphus, Duke of Cambridge	24 February 1774	8 July 1850	Married 1818, Princess Augusta of Hesse-Kassel (1797–1889) 3 children
Portrait of Princess Mary of the United Kingdom	Princess Mary of the United Kingdom	25 April 1776	30 April 1857	Married 1816, Prince William Frederick, Duke of Gloucester and Edinburgh (1776–1834)
Portrait of Princess Sophia of the United Kingdom	Princess Sophia of the United Kingdom	3 November 1777	27 May 1848	
Portrait of Prince Octavius of Great Britain	Prince Octavius of Great Britain	23 February 1779	3 May 1783	
Portrait of Prince Alfred of Great Britain	Prince Alfred of Great Britain	22 September 1780	20 August 1782	
Portrait of Princess Amelia of the United Kingdom	Princess Amelia of the United Kingdom	7 August 1783	2 November 1810	

== Grandchildren ==
=== Children of George IV and Caroline ===
In 1795, George, Prince of Wales, and Caroline of Brunswick married. Nine months after their wedding, Caroline gave birth to their only daughter, Princess Charlotte of Wales. Shortly after Charlotte's birth, George and Caroline separated. In addition, George acquired custody of their daughter.

Children of George IV, King of the United Kingdom
Portrait	Name	Birth	Death	Family
Portrait of Princess Charlotte of Wales	Princess Charlotte of Wales	7 January 1796	6 November 1817	Married 1816, Prince Leopold of Saxe-Coburg-Saalfeld (later Leopold I, King of the Belgians)

=== Children of William IV and Adelaide ===
With the death of Princess Charlotte of Wales in 1817, William came under a certain urgency to produce a legitimate heir to the British throne. In addition, William was aware that his income would increase with marriage. Consequently, he married Princess Adelaide of Saxe-Meiningen in 1818. Although Adelaide and William had two daughters, both died in infancy.

Children of William IV, King of the United Kingdom
Name	Birth	Death
Princess Charlotte of Clarence	21 March 1819	21 March 1819
Princess Elizabeth of Clarence	20 December 1820	4 March 1821

=== Children of Edward and Victoria ===
In 1819, Queen Victoria, the only daughter of Prince Edward, Duke of Kent and Strathearn, was born. Only eight months later, her father died, leaving her mother, Princess Victoria of Saxe-Coburg-Saalfeld, to raise her. The future Queen Victoria was raised in isolation at Kensington Palace, also being kept firmly away from her "wicked uncles" by her mother. This isolation ended only with her accession to the throne in 1837.

Children of Prince Edward, Duke of Kent and Strathearn
Portrait	Name	Birth	Death	Family
Portrait of Queen Victoria	Victoria, Queen of the United Kingdom r. 1837–1901	24 May 1819	22 January 1901	Married 1840, Prince Albert of Saxe-Coburg and Gotha (1819–1861) and had 9 children: Victoria, German Empress (1840–1901); Edward VII, King of the United Kingdom (1841–1910; r. 1901–1910); Alice, Grand Duchess of Hesse (1843–1878); Alfred, Duke of Saxe-Coburg and Gotha (1844–1900; r. 1893–1900); Princess Helena of the United Kingdom (1846–1923); Princess Louise of the United Kingdom (1848–1939); Prince Arthur, Duke of Connaught and Strathearn (1850–1942); Prince Leopold, Duke of Albany (1853–1884); Princess Beatrice of the United Kingdom (1857–1944)

=== Children of Ernest Augustus and Frederica ===
Children of Ernest Augustus, King of Hanover
Portrait	Name	Birth	Death	Family
Portrait of King George V of Hanover	George V, King of Hanover r. 1851–1866	27 May 1819	12 June 1878	Married 1843, Marie of Saxe-Altenburg (1818–1907) and had 3 children: Ernest Augustus, Crown Prince of Hanover (1845–1923); Princess Frederica of Hanover (1848–1926); Princess Marie of Hanover (1849–1904)

=== Children of Adolphus and Augusta ===
Prince Adolphus, Duke of Cambridge and Princess Augusta of Hesse-Kassel had three children: George, Augusta, and Mary Adelaide. They lived at Leineschloss in Hanover, having frequent dances for the entertainment of their children. Occasionally, Adolphus and Augusta's family travelled to the United Kingdom. Eventually, after Adolphus's brother Ernest Augustus became King of Hanover, Adolphus and Augusta permanently relocated to the United Kingdom. The two settled down at Cambridge Cottage and Cambridge House with their family.

Children of Prince Adolphus, Duke of Cambridge
Portrait	Name	Birth	Death	Family
Portrait of Prince George, Duke of Cambridge	Prince George, Duke of Cambridge	26 March 1819	17 March 1904	Married 1847, Sarah Fairbrother (1813–1890) (Note: George and Sarah's marriage was illegal.)
Portrait of Princess Augusta of Cambridge	Princess Augusta of Cambridge	19 July 1822	4 December 1916	Married 1843, Frederick William, Grand Duke of Mecklenburg-Strelitz (1819–1904; r. 1860–1904) and had 2 children: A son (1845–1845); Adolphus Frederick V, Grand Duke of Mecklenburg-Strelitz (1848–1914; r. 1904–1914)
Portrait of Princess Mary Adelaide of Cambridge	Princess Mary Adelaide of Cambridge	27 November 1833	27 October 1897	Married 1866, Francis, Duke of Teck (1837–1900) and had 4 children: Mary, Queen of the United Kingdom (1867–1953); Prince Adolphus, Duke of Teck (1868–1927); Prince Francis of Teck (1870–1910); Prince Alexander of Teck (1874–1957)

== See also ==
- Descendants of Charles I of England
- Descendants of Queen Victoria
- Descendants of George V
- Descendants of Elizabeth II
- Hymen's war terrific – Term referring to multiple of George III's sons marrying in quick succession to sire a British heir

== Footnotes ==
=== References ===
- Kiste, John Van der (19 January 2004). George III's Children. The History Press. p. 205. ISBN 9780750953825.
