= Princess Charlotte of Wales (born 2015) =

British princess

Princess Charlotte
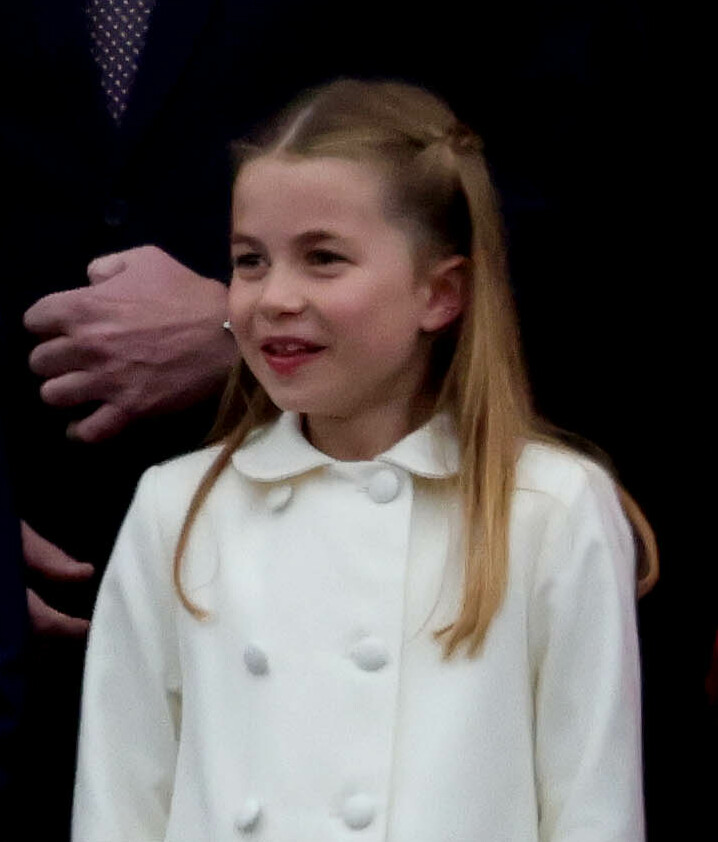
- Charlotte in 2022
- Born: Princess Charlotte of Cambridge; 2 May 2015 (age 11); St Mary's Hospital, London, England
Names
- Charlotte Elizabeth Diana (Note: As a member of the royal family entitled to be called Her Royal Highness, Charlotte does not usually use a family name; but when one is needed, it is usually Mountbatten-Windsor.)
- House: Windsor
- Father: William, Prince of Wales
- Mother: Catherine Middleton

Princess Charlotte of Wales (Charlotte Elizabeth Diana; born 2 May 2015) is a member of the British royal family. She is the second child and only daughter of William, Prince of Wales, and Catherine, Princess of Wales, and a granddaughter of King Charles III and Diana, Princess of Wales. She is third in the line of succession to the British throne. Charlotte was born at St Mary's Hospital, London, during the reign of her paternal great-grandmother, Queen Elizabeth II, and was fourth in line before her great-grandmother's death.

== Infancy ==
Charlotte was born at 8:34 am on 2 May 2015 at St Mary's Hospital, London, during the reign of her paternal great-grandmother, Queen Elizabeth II. She is the second child and only daughter of Prince William and Catherine (then known as Duke and Duchess of Cambridge). She has an elder brother, Prince George, and a younger brother, Prince Louis. Her birth was marked by gun salutes and illuminating London landmarks in pink. On 4 May, her name was announced as Charlotte Elizabeth Diana, honouring her grandfather Charles, her great-grandmother, and her grandmother Diana. Charlotte was christened on 5 July by the archbishop of Canterbury, Justin Welby, at St Mary Magdalene Church, Sandringham. (Note: Her godparents are: Sophie Carter, James Meade, Adam Middleton (her first cousin once removed), The Hon. Laura Fellowes (her first cousin once removed), and Thomas van Straubenzee.)

== Upbringing ==
The family lived at Anmer Hall in Norfolk during Charlotte's infancy, before relocating to Kensington Palace in 2017. Charlotte started at Willcocks Nursery School in January 2018. She joined George at Thomas's School in Battersea in September 2019, where she was known as Charlotte Cambridge. In 2022, the family relocated to Adelaide Cottage in Windsor Home Park, after which she and her brothers began attending Lambrook, an independent preparatory school in Berkshire.

== Official appearances ==
Charlotte accompanied her parents and siblings to her great-grandmother Elizabeth II's Platinum Jubilee celebrations in June 2022. Elizabeth died on 8 September 2022, and Charlotte's grandfather became king. She accordingly became third in line to the throne. Charlotte attended the Queen's state funeral on 19 September 2022 and her grandfather's coronation on 6 May 2023. In August 2026, she and her siblings accompanied their parents to the Commonwealth Games in Glasgow, Scotland.

== Public image ==
Despite the efforts of her parents to keep their children from public view, photographs and public appearances of Charlotte continue to attract media attention. Shopping statistics and polls among parents show that Charlotte is a major children's style icon. Brand Finance previously estimated that she will be worth more than £3 billion to the British economy throughout her lifetime.

== Title and styles ==
Charlotte is a British princess with the official style and title "Her Royal Highness Princess Charlotte of Wales". Before her father was created Prince of Wales on 9 September 2022, Charlotte was styled "Her Royal Highness Princess Charlotte of Cambridge".

== Succession ==
Charlotte is third in the line of succession to the British throne, behind her father and elder brother. Because of the implementation of the Perth Agreement, which replaced male-preference primogeniture with absolute primogeniture, she did not move down the line of succession upon the birth of Prince Louis in April 2018, making her the first British princess in history to rank above a brother in the line of succession.

== See also ==
- Descendants of Elizabeth II
- Family tree of the British royal family
- List of current British princes and princesses

== Notes ==
Princess Charlotte of Wales (born 2015) House of Windsor Born: 2 May 2015
Lines of succession
Preceded by Prince George of Wales	Succession to the British throne 3rd in line	Followed by Prince Louis of Wales
Orders of precedence in the United Kingdom
Preceded by The Duchess of Sussex	Ladies; HRH Princess Charlotte of Wales	Followed by Princess Lilibet of Sussex
