= Prince Louis of Wales =

British prince (born 2018)

Prince Louis
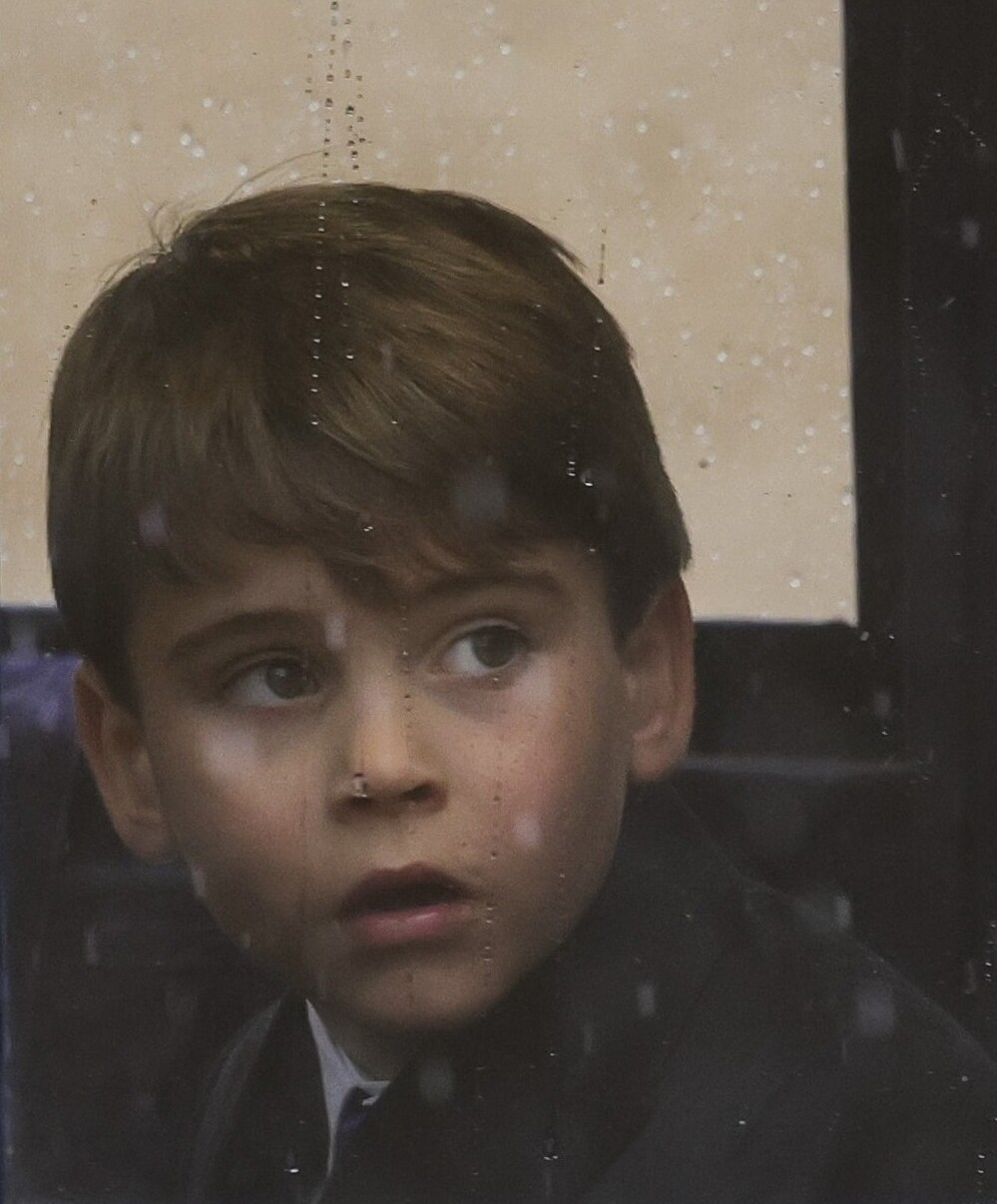
- Louis in 2024
- Born: Prince Louis of Cambridge; 23 April 2018 (age 8); St Mary's Hospital, London, England
Names
- Louis Arthur Charles (Note: As a member of the royal family entitled to be called His Royal Highness, Louis does not usually use a family name; but when one is needed, it is Mountbatten-Windsor.)
- House: Windsor
- Father: William, Prince of Wales
- Mother: Catherine Middleton

Prince Louis of Wales (/ˈluːi/ LOO-ee; Louis Arthur Charles; born 23 April 2018) is a member of the British royal family. He is the third and youngest child of William, Prince of Wales, and Catherine, Princess of Wales, and a grandson of King Charles III and Diana, Princess of Wales. He is fourth in the line of succession to the British throne. Louis was born at St Mary's Hospital, London, during the reign of his paternal great-grandmother, Queen Elizabeth II, and was fifth in line before her death.

== Infancy ==
Louis was born at 11:01 am on 23 April 2018 at St Mary's Hospital, London, during the reign of his paternal great-grandmother, Queen Elizabeth II. He is the youngest child of Prince William and Catherine (then known as Duke and Duchess of Cambridge). He has an elder brother and sister, Prince George and Princess Charlotte. His birth was marked by gun salutes and bell ringing. On 27 April, his name was announced as Louis Arthur Charles, honouring his paternal grandfather, Charles, Prince of Wales (later King Charles III), and his 3rd-great-uncle Louis, Earl Mountbatten of Burma. Louis was christened on 9 July by the archbishop of Canterbury, Justin Welby, in the Chapel Royal at St James's Palace. (Note: His godparents are: Nicholas van Cutsem, Guy Pelly, Harry Aubrey-Fletcher, Lady Laura Meade, Hannah Carter, and Lucy Middleton (his first cousin once removed).)

== Upbringing ==
Louis and his family lived at Kensington Palace and Anmer Hall in Norfolk during his early childhood. He made his Trooping the Colour debut in 2019.

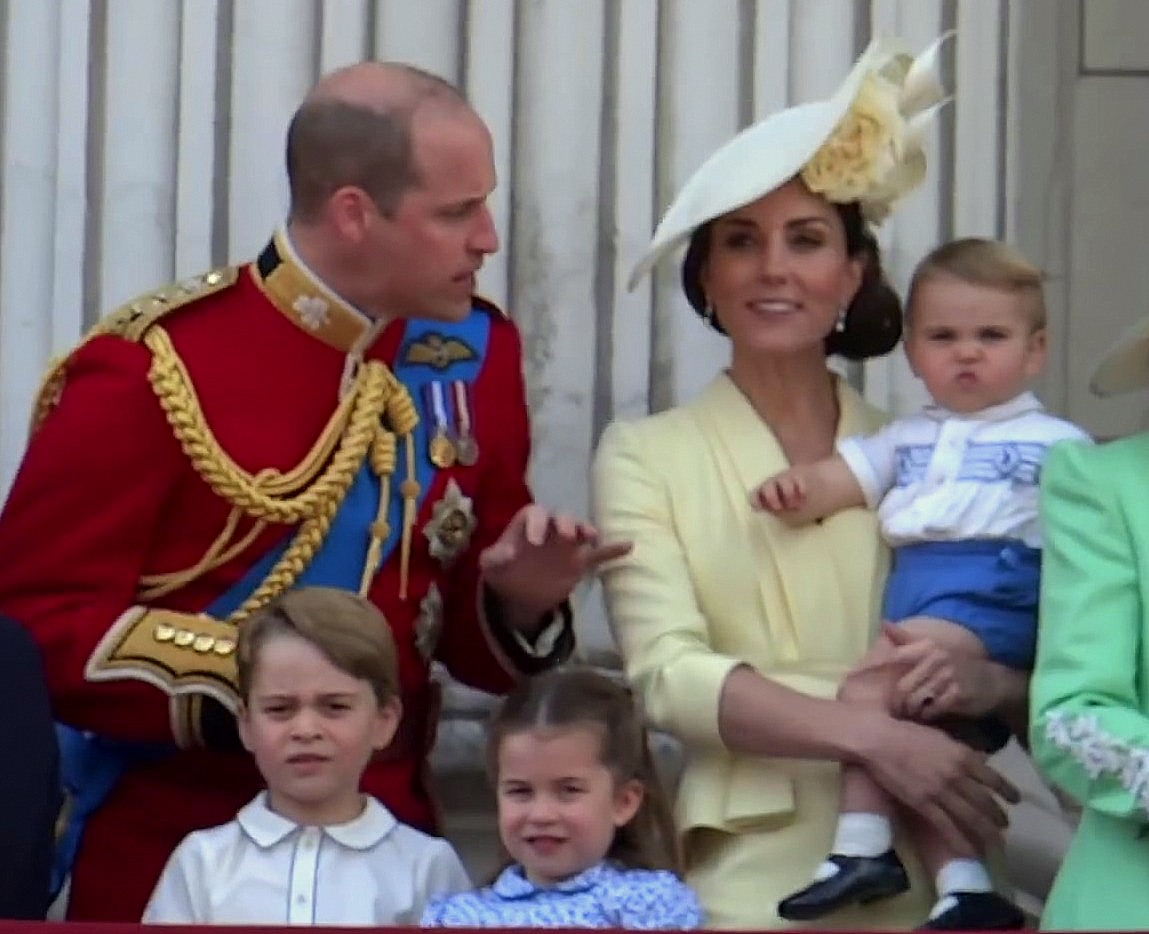
Louis (far right) at Trooping the Colour, 2019

He started at Willcocks Nursery School near Kensington Palace in April 2021. The family relocated to Adelaide Cottage in Windsor Home Park in 2022, after which he began attending Lambrook, an independent preparatory school in Berkshire, with his siblings.

== Official appearances ==
Louis accompanied his parents and siblings to his great-grandmother Elizabeth II's Platinum Jubilee celebrations in June 2022. Elizabeth died on 8 September 2022, and Louis's grandfather became king. Louis accordingly became fourth in line to the throne. He did not attend the Queen's state funeral but was present at his grandfather's coronation on 6 May 2023. In August 2026, Louis and his siblings accompanied their parents to the Commonwealth Games in Glasgow, Scotland.

== Title and style ==
Louis is a British prince with the official style and title "His Royal Highness Prince Louis of Wales". Before his father was created Prince of Wales on 9 September 2022, he was styled "His Royal Highness Prince Louis of Cambridge".

== Succession ==
Louis is fourth in the line of succession to the British throne, behind his father and his two elder siblings. Following the implementation of the Perth Agreement, which replaced male-preference primogeniture with absolute primogeniture, he became the first British prince to be ranked behind an elder sister in the line of succession.

== See also ==
- Descendants of Elizabeth II
- Family tree of the British royal family
- List of current British princes and princesses

== Notes ==
Prince Louis of Wales House of Windsor Born: 23 April 2018
Lines of succession
Preceded by Princess Charlotte of Wales	Succession to the British throne 4th in line	Followed by The Duke of Sussex
Orders of precedence in the United Kingdom
Preceded by Prince George of Wales	Gentlemen; HRH Prince Louis of Wales	Succeeded by Prince Archie of Sussex
