= Descendants of Charles I of England =

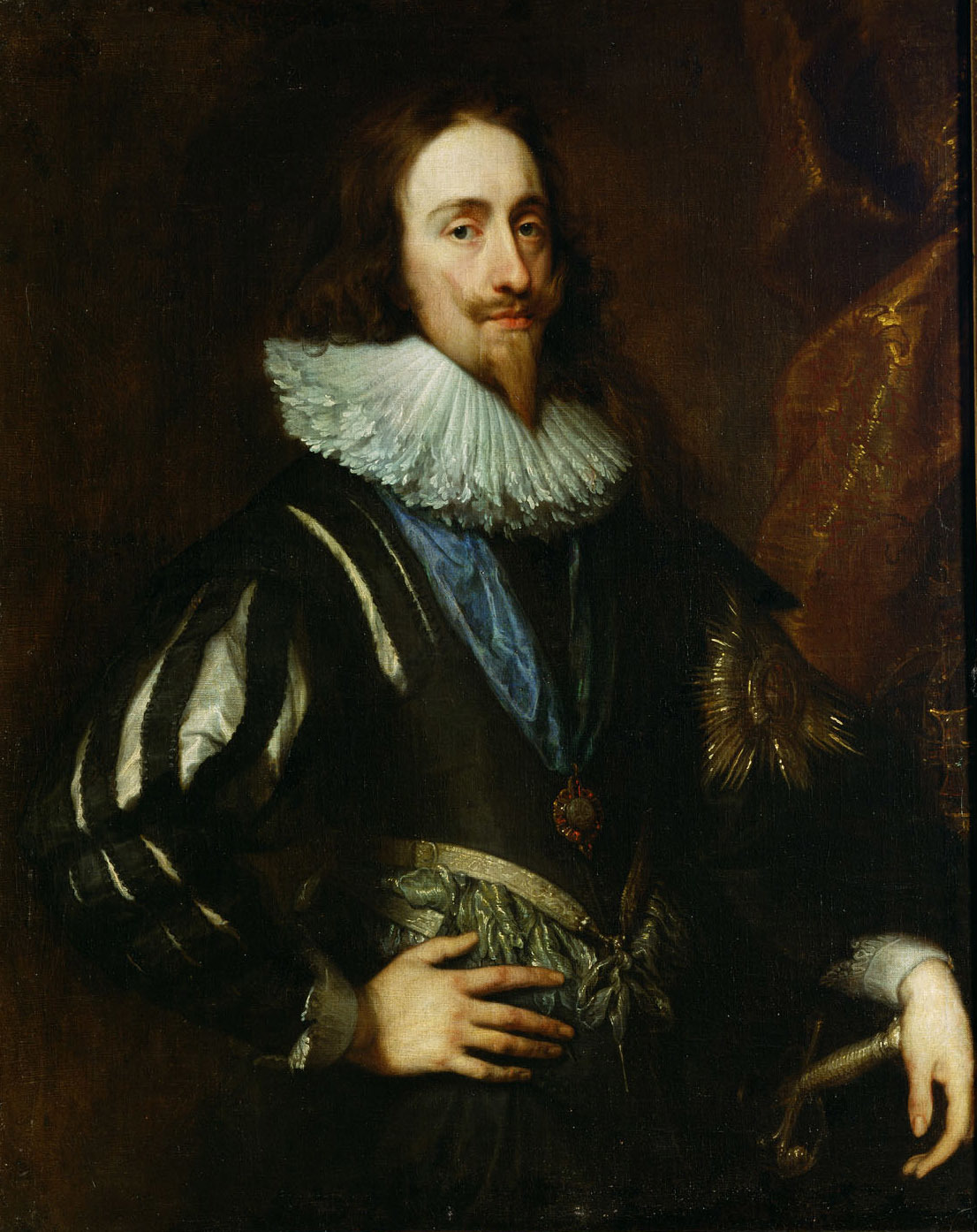
King Charles I of England

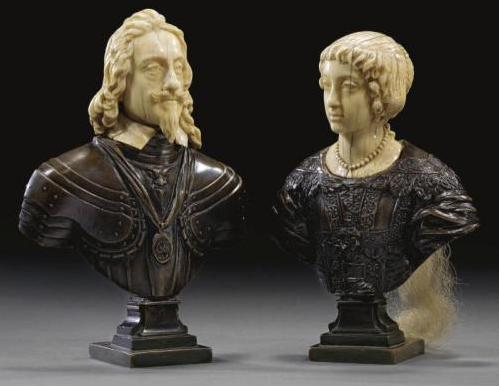
Busts of King Charles and his wife Queen Henrietta Maria

Charles I of England was the second king of the then newly enthroned House of Stuart and had many descendants. He was the second but eldest surviving son of King James I of England. He became heir apparent to the English, Irish and Scottish thrones on the death of his elder brother in 1612. Later, he married a Bourbon princess, Henrietta Maria of France, after a failed Spanish match.

During his time in Spain, he met a daughter from one of the junior branches of the Brydges family (Barons Chandos) of Sudeley Castle. By her Charles was alleged to have fathered a natural daughter, Joanna Brydges, who was brought up in Mandinam, Wales and married Bishop Jeremy Taylor as his second wife; there is no hard evidence for Charles' paternity. From this marriage, two daughters were born, Mary Taylor, who married Bishop Francis Marsh and had issue; and Joanna Taylor, who married Edward Harrison, MP for Lisburn, and had issue.

His reign is known for his conflicts with the Parliament of England, which sought to curb his royal prerogative. Charles believed in the divine right of kings, which was against the belief of many of his subjects, leading to them perceiving his actions as those of a tyrannical absolute monarch. His religious policies, coupled with his marriage to a Roman Catholic, made him an enemy of the Puritans and Calvinists. Most of his actions as monarch ultimately helped precipitate the English Civil War and his eventual deposition and beheading in 1649 and the declaration of the Protectorate under Oliver Cromwell.

Many of today's European royalty are descendants of Charles, such as Felipe VI of Spain, Franz, Duke of Bavaria, Philippe of Belgium, Guillaume V, Grand Duke of Luxembourg and Karl von Habsburg. Many are related to him via collateral lines, such as Charles III of the United Kingdom (descended from his sister Elizabeth Stuart, Queen of Bohemia, mother of Sophia, Electress of Hanover); Willem-Alexander of the Netherlands and Frederik X of Denmark. He is also an ancestor of Diana, Princess of Wales via three illegitimate grandchildren. This article deals with the numerous individuals who are and were descendants of Charles by his wife Henrietta Maria of France. He is not known to have had any illegitimate children after his marriage.

== Marriage and progeny ==
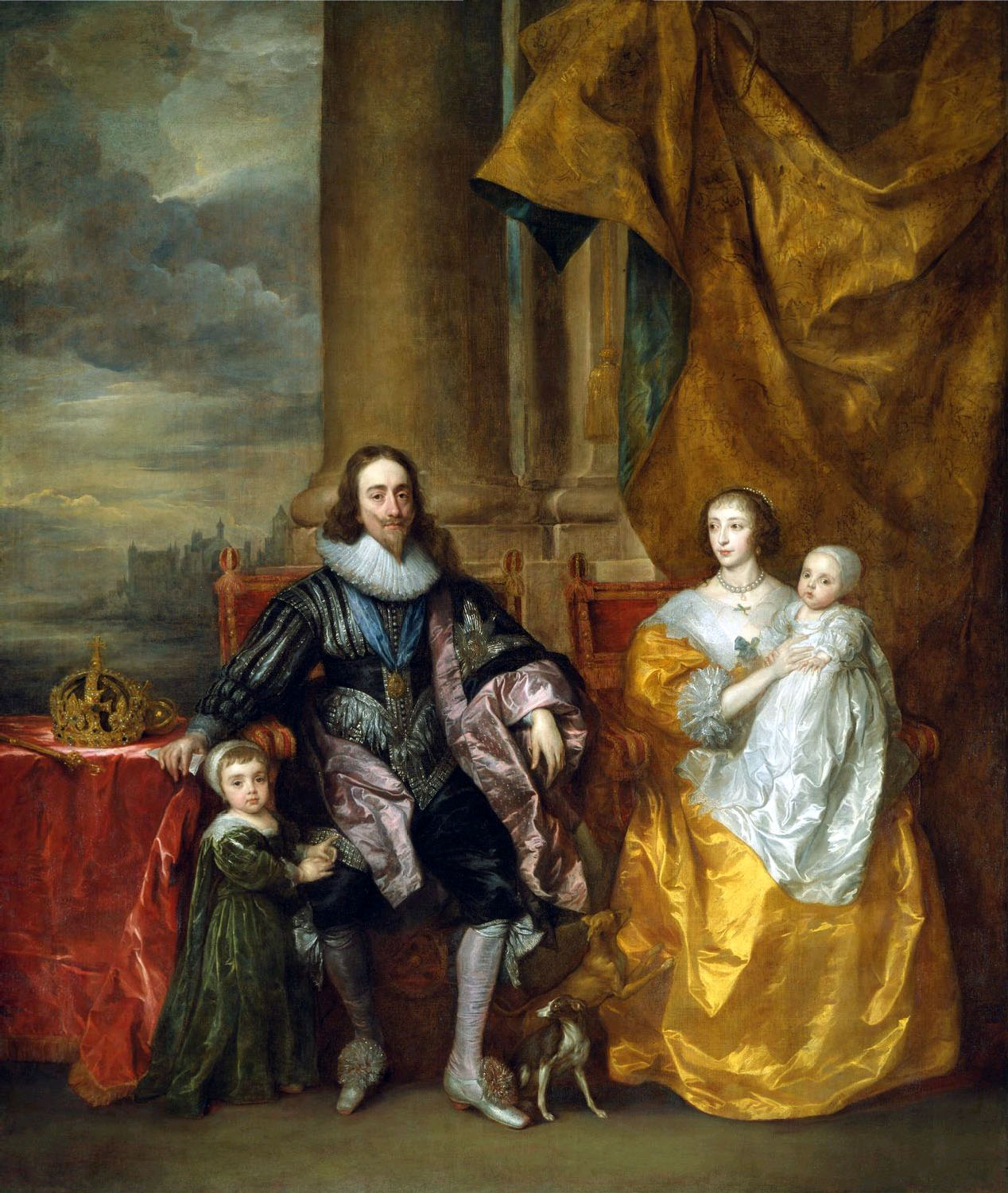
King Charles and Queen Henrietta Maria with their eldest infant children

Name	Portrait	Birth	Death	Marriages and issue
King Charles II of England		29 May 1630	6 February 1685	Married Catherine of Braganza in 1662. No legitimate liveborn issue. had illegitimate issue from various mistresses
Mary, Princess Royal		4 November 1631	24 December 1660	Married William II, Prince of Orange (1626–1650) in 1641. She had one child: King William III.
King James II of England		24 October 1633	16 September 1701	Married 1stly: Anne Hyde (1637–1671) in 1660. Had issue, Protestants, Queen Mary II and Queen Anne; Married 2ndly: Mary of Modena (1658–1718) in 1673. Had issue, Roman Catholics, namely James, Prince of Wales "the Old Pretender" and Louisa Maria Teresa
Elizabeth Stuart	Princess Elizabeth - NPG D28654	28 December 1635	8 September 1650	No issue
Henry, Duke of Gloucester		8 July 1640	13 September 1660	No issue
Princess Henrietta Anne		16 June 1644	30 June 1670	Married Philippe I, Duke of Orléans (1640–1701) in 1661. Had issue.

== Descendants ==
=== Illegitimate progeny of Charles II of England ===
Name of descendant	Portrait	Birth and parents	Marriages and issue	Death	Miscellaneous
James Scott, 1st Duke of Monmouth		9 April 1649; Rotterdam, Netherlands; Son of Charles II and Lucy Walter	Anne Scott, 1st Duchess of Buccleuch	15 July 1685 (aged 36)	Ancestor of Spencer Perceval, Princess Alice, Duchess of Gloucester and Sarah Ferguson.
Charles FitzCharles, 1st Earl of Plymouth		1657; Westminster, England; Son of Charles II and Catherine Pegge	Lady Bridget Osborne; No issue	17 October 1680 (aged 23)	Has no surviving descendants.
Charles Fitzroy, 2nd Duke of Cleveland		18 June 1662; Son of Charles II and Barbara Villiers, 1st Duchess of Cleveland	Mary Wood no issue Anne Pulteney had issue	9 September 1730 (aged 68)	Has no surviving descendants.
Charlotte Lee, Countess of Lichfield		5 September 1664; Daughter of Charles II and Barbara Villiers, 1st Duchess of Cleveland	Edward Lee, 1st Earl of Lichfield; 18 children	17 February 1718 (aged 54)	Ancestor of Anthony Eden; Her great-great-granddaughter Eleanor Calvert married John Parke Custis, stepson of George Washington. She is also an ancestor of the Mitford sisters.
Henry FitzRoy, 1st Duke of Grafton		28 September 1663; Son of Charles II and Barbara Villiers, 1st Duchess of Cleveland	Isabella Bennet, 2nd Countess of Arlington; 1 son	9 October 1690 (aged 27)	Ancestor of Diana, Princess of Wales
George FitzRoy, 1st Duke of Northumberland		28 December 1665; Son of Charles II and Barbara Villiers, 1st Duchess of Cleveland	Catherine Wheatly; No issue Mary Dutton; No issue	28 June 1716 (aged 51)	Has no surviving descendants.
Charles Beauclerk, 1st Duke of St Albans		8 May 1670; Son of Charles II and Nell Gwynne	Diana de Vere; 12 children 1 illegitimate daughter	10 May 1726 (aged 56)	Ancestor of Samantha Cameron, wife of former Conservative Leader and Prime Minister David Cameron.
Charles Lennox, 1st Duke of Richmond		29 July 1672; England; Son of Charles II and Louise de Kérouaille, Duchess of Portsmouth	Anne Brudenell; 3 children 1 illegitimate child	27 May 1723 (aged 51)	Ancestor of Diana, Princess of Wales and Queen Camilla

=== Progeny of Princess Mary ===
Name of descendant	Portrait	Birth and parents	Marriages and issue	Death	Miscellaneous
King William III of England		14 November 1650; Son of Mary and William II	Mary II of England; No Issue	8 March 1702 (aged 51)	Deposed his uncle James II of England and was crowned King. Married his cousin, Princess Mary, and jointly ruled with her; has no surviving descendants.

=== Progeny of James II of England ===
Name of descendant	Portrait	Birth and parents	Marriages and issue	Death	Miscellaneous
Queen Mary II of England		30 April 1662, daughter of James II and Lady Anne Hyde	William III of England; No issue	28 December 1694 (aged 32)	Ruled jointly with her cousin and husband, William; has no descendants.
Queen Anne of Great Britain		6 February 1665, Daughter of James II and Lady Anne Hyde	Prince George of Denmark; 17 children	1 August 1714 (aged 49)	Presided over the union of England and Scotland as Great Britain; Her only son to survive infanthood, Prince William, Duke of Gloucester, died young, hence she has no descendants.
James Francis Edward Stuart		10 June 1688, Son of James II and Mary of Modena	Maria Klementyna Sobieska; 2 children	1 January 1766 (aged 77)	The House of Stuart ended with the death of his second son, the Cardinal Duke of York.
Louisa Maria Teresa Stuart		28 June 1692, Daughter of James II and Mary of Modena	Never married	18 April 1712 (aged 19)	She was the last legitimate female scion of the House of Stuart, other than her elder half-sister, Anne; She was a possible match for Charles XII of Sweden, her first cousin, once removed Charles, Duke of Berry, and another cousin, the future George II of Great Britain; has no descendants.

=== Illegitimate progeny of James II of England ===
Name of descendant	Portrait	Birth and parents	Marriages and issue	Death	Miscellaneous
James FitzJames, 1st Duke of Berwick		21 August 1670, Son of James II and his mistress Arabella Churchill	Honora Burke 1 son Anne Bulkeley 13 children	12 June 1734 (aged 64)	Has surviving descendants.
Henrietta FitzJames		1667, Daughter of James II and his mistress Arabella Churchill	Henry Waldegrave, 1st Baron Waldegrave 2 children Piers Butler, 3rd Viscount Galmoye No issue	3 April 1730 (aged 62–63)	Ancestor of Diana, Princess of Wales.

=== Progeny of Henrietta of England ===
Name of descendant	Portrait	Birth and parents	Marriages and issue	Death	Miscellaneous
Marie Louise d'Orléans		26 March 1662, Daughter of Philippe d'Orléans and Henrietta	Charles II of Spain; No Issue	12 February 1689 (aged 26)	Was the first wife of the last Habsburg monarch of Spain, Charles II. Has no descendants.
Anne Marie d'Orléans		27 August 1669, Daughter of Philippe d'Orléans and Henrietta	Victor Amadeus II of Sardinia; 3 children	26 August 1728 (aged 69)	Has surviving descendants. Her daughter married into the French royal family and became the mother of Louis XV of France.

=== Grandchildren and later descendants of Henrietta of England ===
Name of descendant	Portrait	Birth and parents	Marriages and issue	Death	Miscellaneous
Marie Adélaïde of Savoy		6 December 1685, Daughter of Anne Marie and Victor Amadeus	Louis, Duke of Burgundy; 2 children	12 February 1712 (aged 26)	Has surviving descendants through her only surviving son, Louis, who succeeded his great-grandfather as Louis XV of France.
Louis XV of France		15 February 1710, Son of Marie Adélaïde and Louis, Duke of Burgundy	Marie Leszczyńska; 10 children	10 May 1774 (aged 64)	Has surviving descendants, among whom are Felipe VI of Spain and Louis Alphonse, Duke of Anjou, the current legitimist pretender to the defunct French throne.
Louise Élisabeth, Duchess of Parma		14 August 1727, Daughter of Louis XV and Marie Leszczyńska	Philip, Duke of Parma; 3 children	6 December 1759 (aged 32)	Has numerous descendants through her son, Ferdinand, Duke of Parma and her daughter Maria Luisa (later Queen of Spain). Their descendants frequently intermarried between each other and as such, many individuals today can claim descent from both siblings. Among their descendants are Felipe VI of Spain, Henri, Grand Duke of Luxembourg, Philippe of Belgium, Louis Alphonse, Duke of Anjou and Infanta Alicia, Duchess of Calabria.
Ferdinand, Duke of Parma		20 January 1751, Son of Louise Élisabeth and Philip, Duke of Parma	Maria Amalia of Austria; 3 children	9 October 1802 (aged 51)	His surviving daughter Caroline married into the Royal Family of Saxony and has many descendants within the Royal Families of Saxony, Italy, Austria and Bavaria. His son Louis continued the line of the House of Bourbon-Parma. He is also an ancestor of the current Carlist pretender to the Spanish throne, Carlos, Duke of Parma and also of members of the Tuscan, Austrian and Luxembourgish royal families.
Maria Luisa, Queen of Spain		9 December 1751; Daughter of Louise Élisabeth and Philip, Duke of Parma	Charles IV of Spain; 7 children	2 January 1819 (aged 67)	Has numerous descendants in the existing branches of the House of Bourbon and also shares many descendants with her brother, Ferdinand, due to the intermarriage prevalent in the Spanish branch of the House of Bourbon and its own cadet branches. Royal heads of state like Felipe VI of Spain, Philippe of Belgium and Henri, Grand Duke of Luxembourg descend in direct lines from her.

== See also ==
- House of Stuart
- Jacobite succession
- Descendants of George III
- Descendants of Queen Victoria
- Descendants of George V
- Descendants of Elizabeth II
