= Prince George of Wales =

British prince (born 2013)

Prince George
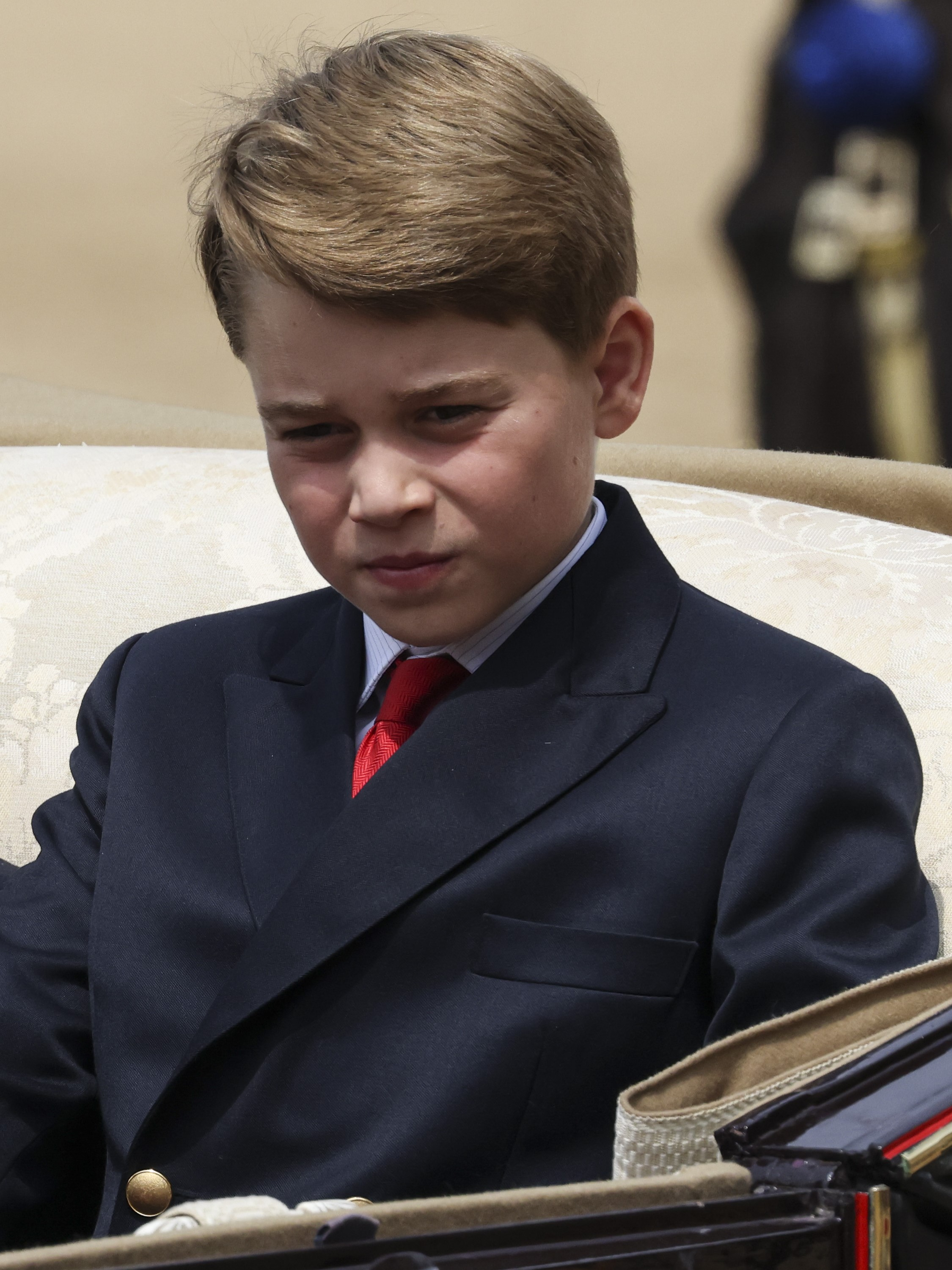
- George in 2023
- Born: Prince George of Cambridge; 22 July 2013 (age 13); St Mary's Hospital, London, England
Names
- George Alexander Louis (Note: As a member of the royal family entitled to be called His Royal Highness, George does not usually use a family name, but when one is needed, it is usually Mountbatten-Windsor.)
- House: Windsor
- Father: William, Prince of Wales
- Mother: Catherine Middleton

Prince George of Wales (George Alexander Louis; born 22 July 2013) is a member of the British royal family. He is the eldest child of William, Prince of Wales, and Catherine, Princess of Wales, and the eldest grandchild of King Charles III and Diana, Princess of Wales. He is second in the line of succession to the British throne, behind his father.

George was born at St Mary's Hospital, London, during the reign of his paternal great-grandmother Queen Elizabeth II, and was third in line before her death. His birth was widely celebrated across the Commonwealth realms due to the expectation that he will eventually become king.

== Infancy ==
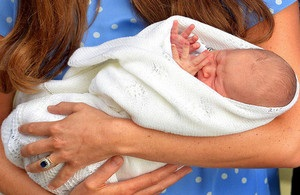
George and Catherine leaving the hospital, July 2013

George was born at 4:24 pm on 22 July 2013 at St Mary's Hospital, London, during the reign of his paternal great-grandmother, Queen Elizabeth II. He is the eldest child of Prince William and Catherine (then known as Duke and Duchess of Cambridge). He has a younger sister and brother, Princess Charlotte and Prince Louis. His birth was announced by press release and followed by the display of a traditional easel in the forecourt of Buckingham Palace. Celebrations were staged in the United Kingdom and other Commonwealth realms and the newborn was widely hailed as a future king in the majority of British newspapers. His name was announced as George Alexander Louis on 24 July.

George was third in the line of succession to the British throne at the time of his birth. For the first time since the reign of Queen Victoria, three generations in direct line of succession to the British throne were alive at the same time, all descended from Elizabeth II: George; his father, William; and his grandfather, Charles. George was christened on 23 October by the archbishop of Canterbury, Justin Welby, in the Chapel Royal at St James's Palace. (Note: His godparents are: Oliver Baker, Emilia Jardine-Paterson, Earl Grosvenor (later Duke of Westminster), Jamie Lowther-Pinkerton, Julia Samuel, William van Cutsem and Zara Tindall (his paternal first cousin once removed).)

== Upbringing ==
George spent his first months in Anglesey, Wales, before his family relocated to Kensington Palace in 2014. That April, he accompanied his parents on his first royal tour, during which they spent three weeks in New Zealand and Australia. Although George appeared only twice, the BBC described the "nine-month-old future king" as "the star of the show". The then Australian prime minister Tony Abbott predicted in the Parliament House, Canberra, that George would one day be welcomed there as King of Australia. Australian media called him "the republican slayer" after polls showed the lowest support for republicanism in the country for 35 years. In June 2015, George made his first appearance on the balcony of Buckingham Palace following the Trooping the Colour parade. From 2015 to 2017, his family lived at Anmer Hall in Norfolk, where he started at West Acre Montessori School Nursery in January 2016. George met Barack and Michelle Obama, then President and First Lady of the United States, in April 2016.

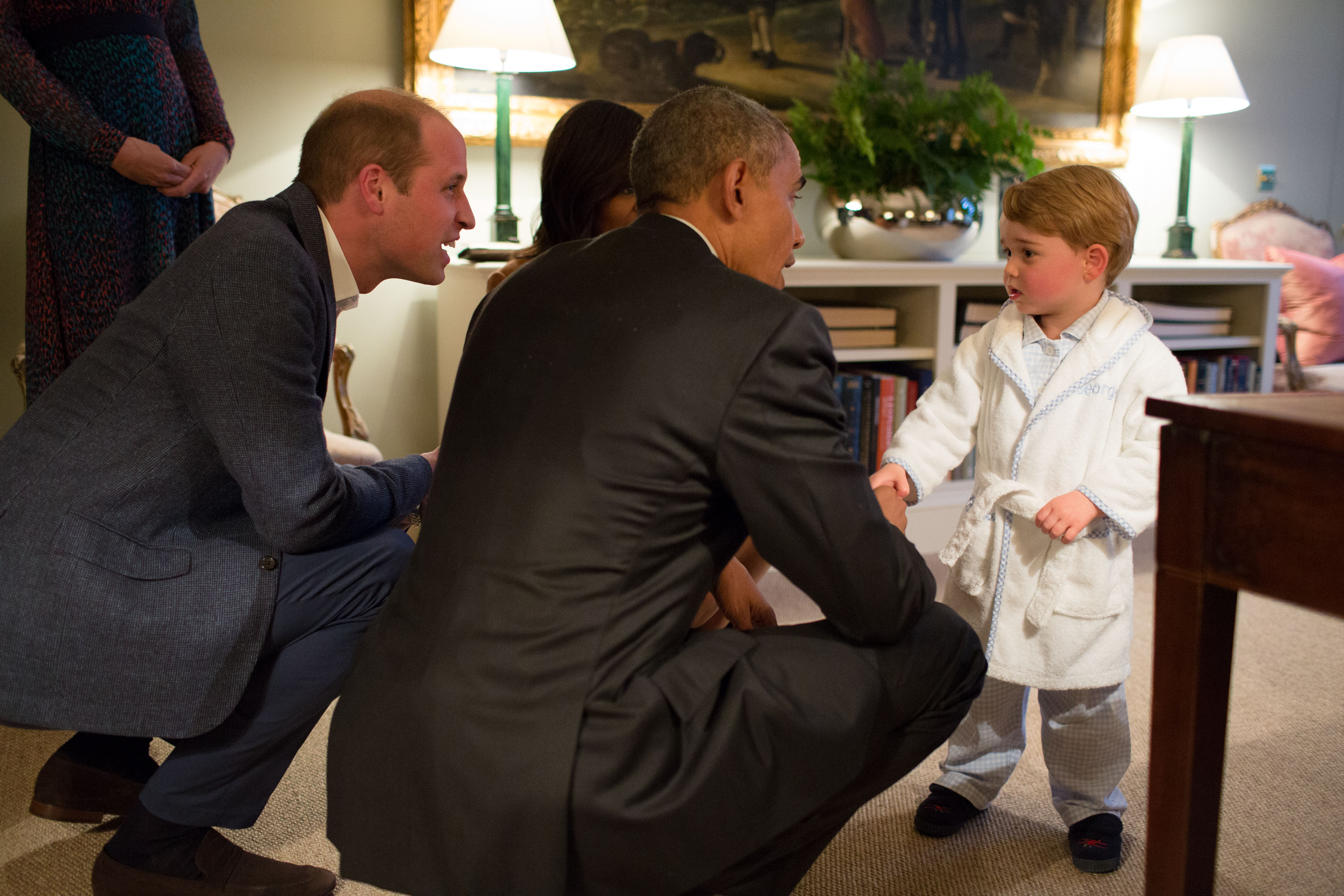
George meeting Barack and Michelle Obama at Kensington Palace, 2016

George started junior school under the name George Cambridge in September 2017, at Thomas's School, an independent preparatory school in Battersea. In 2022, the family relocated to Adelaide Cottage in Windsor Home Park. Since September of that year, George and his siblings have attended Lambrook, an independent preparatory school in Berkshire. He commenced flying lessons in September 2024. George began attending Eton College in September 2026.

== Official appearances ==
George took part in his great-grandmother Elizabeth II's Platinum Jubilee celebrations in June 2022, including the Trooping the Colour carriage procession. Elizabeth died on 8 September 2022 and was succeeded by George's grandfather, Charles III, making George second in line to the throne, behind his father. He attended the Queen's state funeral on 19 September 2022 and served as a page of honour at his grandfather's coronation on 6 May 2023. In December 2025, George accompanied his father on a visit to The Passage, a homelessness charity of which his father is patron. In June 2026, he joined his mother on an engagement at RAF Coningsby. In August 2026, George and his siblings accompanied their parents to the Commonwealth Games in Glasgow, Scotland.

== Public image ==
Clothing and other products used by George are often sold out, a phenomenon termed the "Prince George effect". His parents have been adamant about maintaining their son's privacy during his childhood. In August 2015, Kensington Palace stated that they wanted all global media to stop taking unauthorised photographs of George, saying that "a line [had] been crossed" in paparazzi methods of locating and photographing him, including surveilling the family and sending children to bring George into view.

== Title and styles ==
George is a British prince with the official style and title "His Royal Highness Prince George of Wales". During the reign of his great-grandmother, he was styled "His Royal Highness Prince George of Cambridge".

== See also ==
- Family tree of the British royal family
- List of current British princes and princesses

== Notes ==
Prince George of Wales House of Windsor Born: 22 July 2013
Lines of succession
| Preceded by The Prince of Wales | Succession to the British throne 2nd in line | Followed by Princess Charlotte of Wales |
Orders of precedence in the United Kingdom
| Preceded by The Duke of Sussex | Gentlemen; HRH Prince George of Wales | Succeeded by Prince Louis of Wales |
