= Marie of Saxe-Altenburg =

Queen of Hanover from 1851 to 1866

- Duchess of Cumberland and Teviotdale
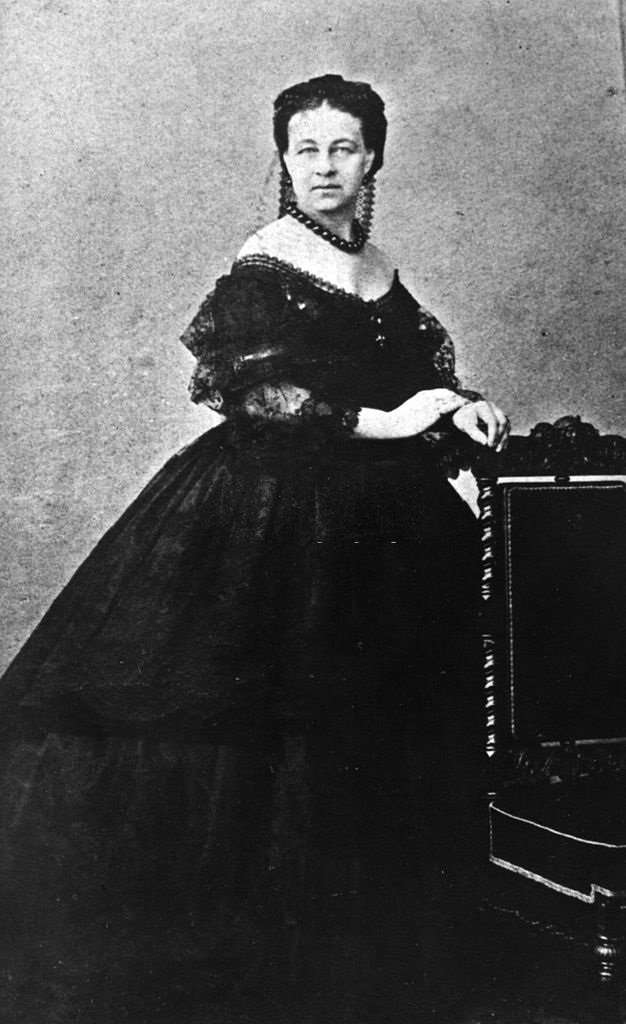
- Queen Marie, 1860s

Queen consort of Hanover
- Tenure: 18 November 1851 – 20 September 1866
- Born: Princess Marie of Saxe-Hildburghausen; 14 April 1818; Hildburghausen, Saxe-Hildburghausen
- Died: 9 January 1907 (aged 88); Gmunden, Austria-Hungary
- Burial: 19 January 1907; Gmunden, Austria-Hungary
- Spouse: George V of Hanover (m. 1843; died 1878)
- Issue: Ernest Augustus, Crown Prince of Hanover; Princess Frederica, Baroness von Pawel-Rammingen; Princess Marie of Hanover
Names
- Alexandrina Marie Wilhelmina Catherine Charlotte Theresa Henrietta Louise Pauline Elizabeth Frederica Georgina
- House: Saxe-Altenburg
- Father: Joseph, Duke of Saxe-Altenburg
- Mother: Duchess Amelia of Württemberg

Marie of Saxe-Altenburg (Alexandrina Marie Wilhelmina Catherine Charlotte Theresa Henrietta Louise Pauline Elizabeth Frederica Georgina; German: Alexandrine Marie Wilhelmine Katharine Charlotte Theresia Henriette Luise Pauline Elisabeth Friederike Georgine; 14 April 1818 – 9 January 1907) was Queen of Hanover from 18 November 1851 until 20 September 1866 as the wife of King George V. George V was a grandson of George III of the United Kingdom and his wife, Charlotte of Mecklenburg-Strelitz.

== Early life ==
Marie was born at Hildburghausen, as Princess Marie of Saxe-Hildburghausen, the eldest daughter of Joseph, the Hereditary Prince of Saxe-Hildburghausen and Duchess Amelia of Württemberg. In 1826, the family moved to Altenburg as a result of a transfer of territories among the various branches of the Ernestine Wettins, and Marie took the title Princess of Saxe-Altenburg in place of the previous.

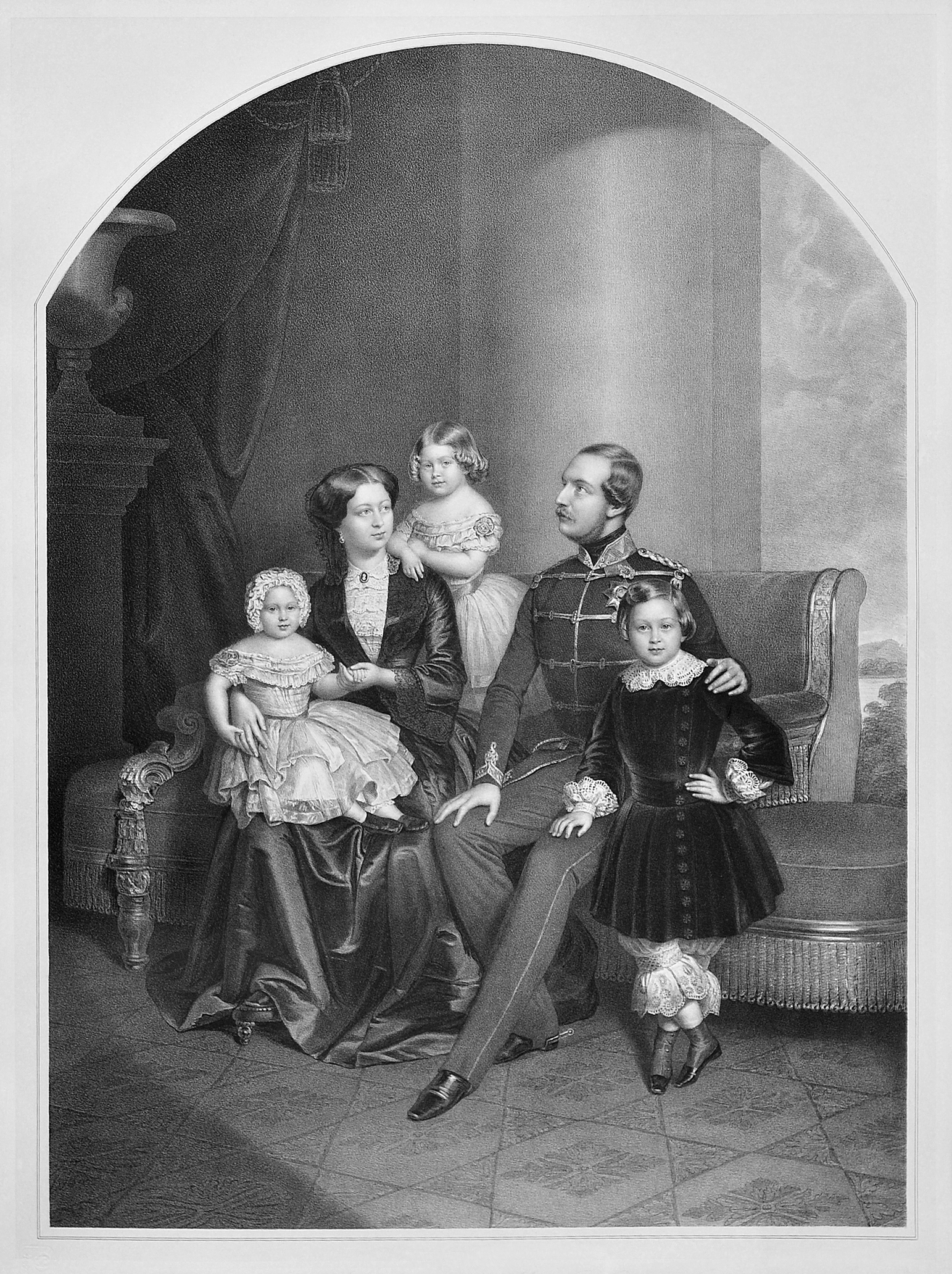
Marie of Saxe-Altenburg with her husband, George V of Hanover, and their children Ernest Augustus, Crown Prince of Hanover, Princess Frederica of Hanover, and Princess Marie of Hanover

== Marriage ==
Marie married her second cousin once removed George, Crown Prince of Hanover, on 18 February 1843 at Hanover. They had three children: Prince Ernest Augustus, Princess Frederica, and Princess Marie.

== Queen of Hanover ==
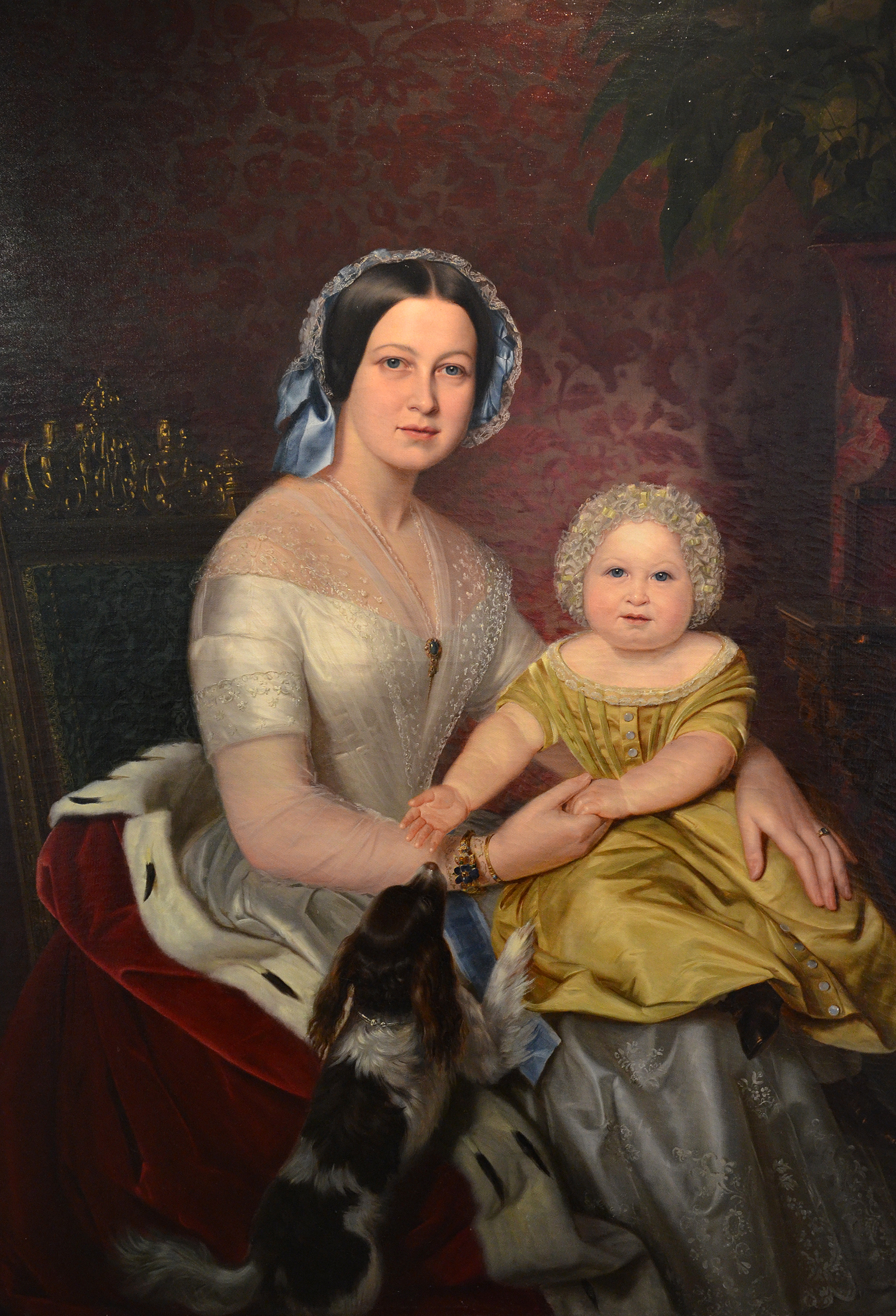
Oil painting of "Marie, Queen of Hanover and Crown Prince Ernst August" by court painter Carl Oesterley, c. 1846

The Crown Prince, blind since his youth, and his wife became King and Queen of Hanover upon the death of his father, Ernest Augustus, King of Hanover, on 18 November 1851.

Between 1858 and 1867 George V had Marienburg Castle built as a birthday present to his wife, named after her. However, he was expelled from his kingdom in 1866 as a result of his support for Austria in the Austro-Prussian War, and on 20 September 1866, the Kingdom was annexed by Prussia. Nevertheless, George never abdicated; he emigrated to Vienna, Austria, while Marie and her daughters remained at Herrenhausen Palace, then moving to Marienburg Castle, which was still under construction, in September 1867. Marie succeeded in having the Hanoverian crown jewels and other precious items smuggled abroad, before finally leaving for Austria herself. There, the family moved into a villa in Gmunden near Salzburg, which they rented and later acquired.

On 18 September 1872, Queen Marie was godmother to Queen Victoria's granddaughter, Princess Marie Louise of Schleswig-Holstein. Princess Marie Louise was the youngest daughter of Princess Helena of Schleswig-Holstein-Sonderburg-Augustenburg; Queen Victoria & Prince Albert's third daughter and fifth child.

George V. died in 1878 on a travel in Paris where he had attempted to re-establish his Guelphic Legion, a military unit aimed at a re-conquest of his kingdom. He was buried in St George's Chapel at Windsor Castle. Queen Marie died, some twenty-eight years after her husband, on 9 January 1907, in The Queen's Villa (Königinvilla) at Gmunden, where she was later buried in a mausoleum that her eldest son had built next to his residence, Cumberland Castle.

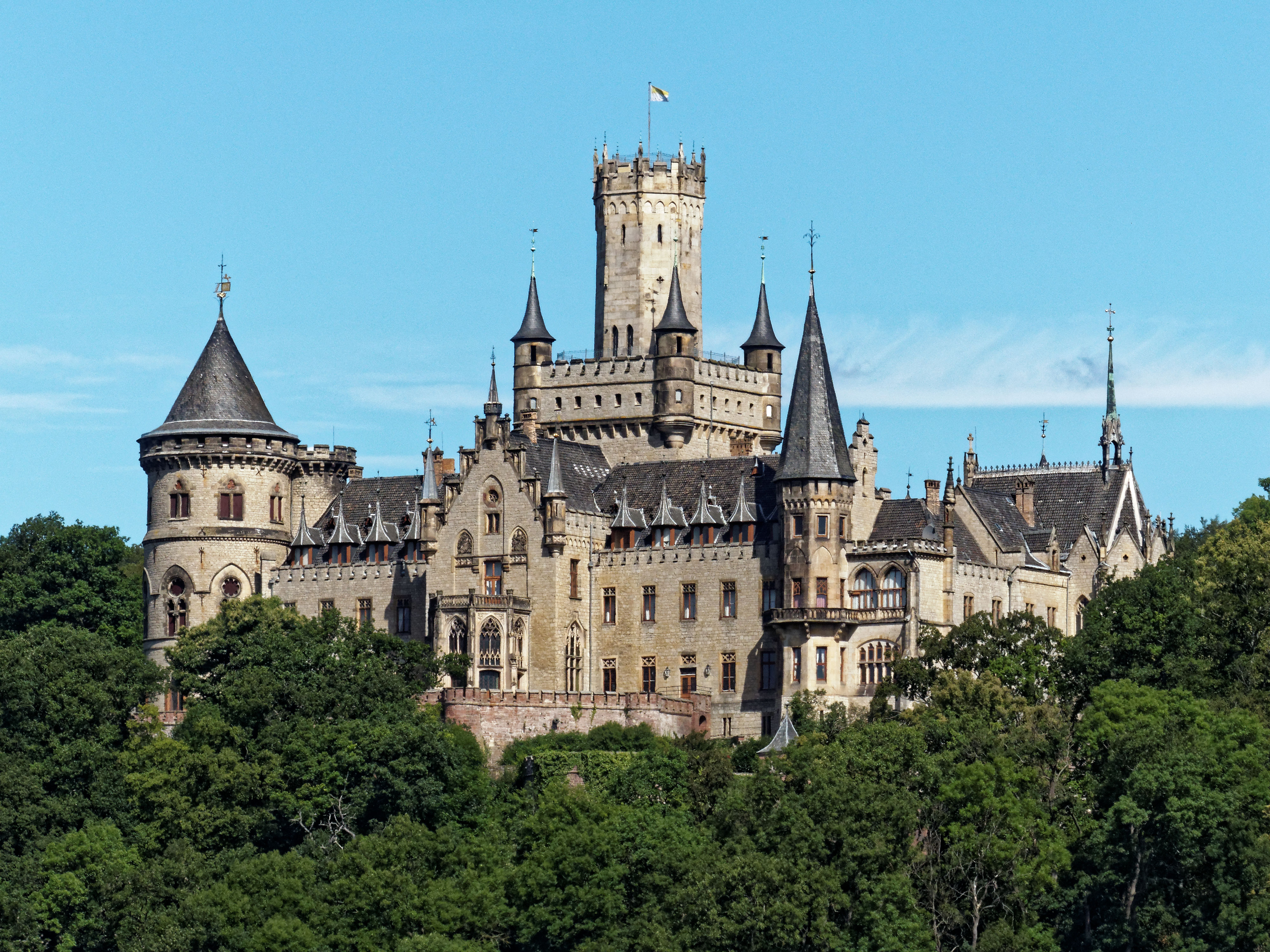
Marienburg Castle

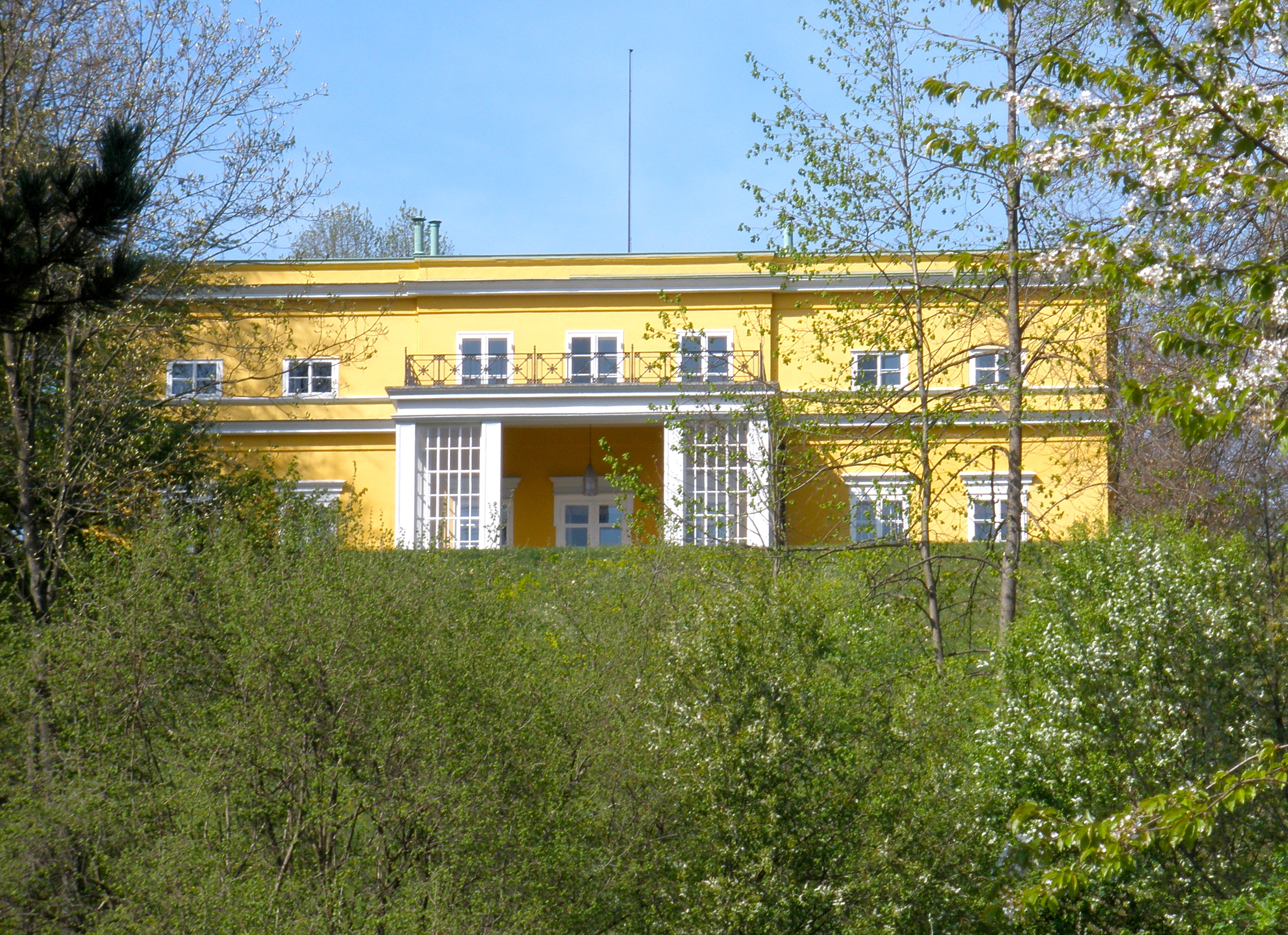
The Queen's Villa in Gmunden

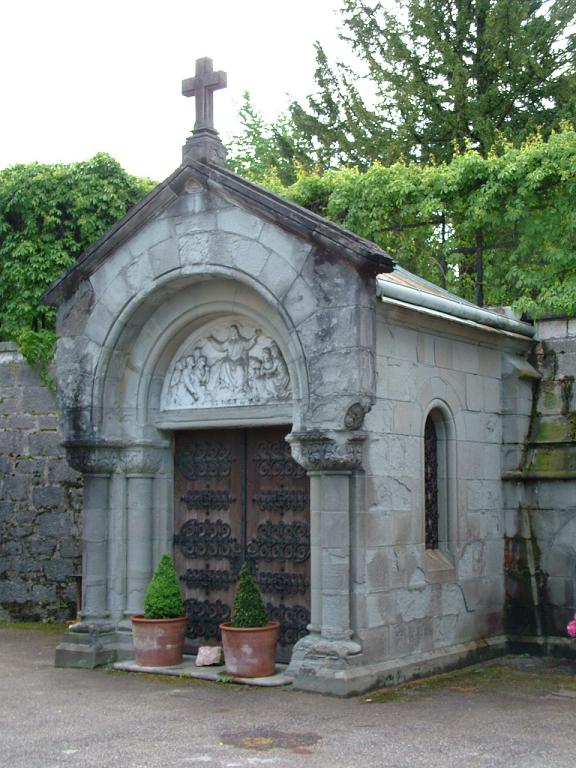
Mausoleum of Queen Marie in Gmunden

== Issue ==
Name	Birth	Death	Notes
Ernest Augustus, Crown Prince of Hanover	21 September 1845	14 November 1923	Ernest Augustus William Adolphus George Frederick; born at Hanover, married Princess Thyra of Denmark; had issue
Princess Frederica of Hanover	9 January 1848	16 October 1926	born at Hanover, died at Biarritz; married Alfons, Baron von Pawel-Rammingen; had issue
Princess Marie of Hanover	3 December 1849	4 June 1904	Marie Ernestine Josephine Adolphine Henrietta Theresa Elizabeth Alexandrina; born at Hanover, died unmarried at Gmunden

== Ancestry ==
Ancestors of Marie of Saxe-Altenburg

8. Ernest Frederick III, Duke of Saxe-Hildburghausen
4. Frederick, Duke of Saxe-Altenburg
9. Princess Ernestine of Saxe-Weimar
2. Joseph, Duke of Saxe-Altenburg
10. Charles II, Grand Duke of Mecklenburg-Strelitz
5. Duchess Charlotte Georgine of Mecklenburg-Strelitz
11. Princess Friederike of Hesse-Darmstadt
1. Marie, Queen of Hanover
12. Frederick II Eugene, Duke of Württemberg
6. Duke Louis of Württemberg
13. Margravine Friederike of Brandenburg-Schwedt
3. Duchess Amelia of Württemberg
14. Charles Christian, Prince of Nassau-Weilburg
7. Princess Henriette of Nassau-Weilburg
15. Princess Carolina of Orange-Nassau

Marie of Saxe-Altenburg House of Saxe-Altenburg Cadet branch of the House of Wettin Born: 14 April 1818 Died: 9 January 1907
Hanoverian royalty
Preceded by Frederica of Mecklenburg-Strelitz	Queen consort of Hanover; 18 November 1851 – 20 September 1866	Kingdom abolished
Titles in pretence
Loss of title	— TITULAR — Queen consort of Hanover; 20 September 1866 – 12 June 1878	Succeeded by Thyra of Denmark
