= George of Hanover =

George of Hanover may refer to the following monarchs from the House of Hanover:

- George I of Great Britain, also Elector of Hanover
- George II of Great Britain, also Elector of Hanover
- George III of Great Britain/the United Kingdom, also Elector and King of Hanover
- George IV, King of Great Britain and Hanover
- George V of Hanover, not the same person as George V of the United Kingdom
