= Marienburg Castle (Hanover) =

Castle in Lower Saxony, Germany

- Schloss Marienburg (German)
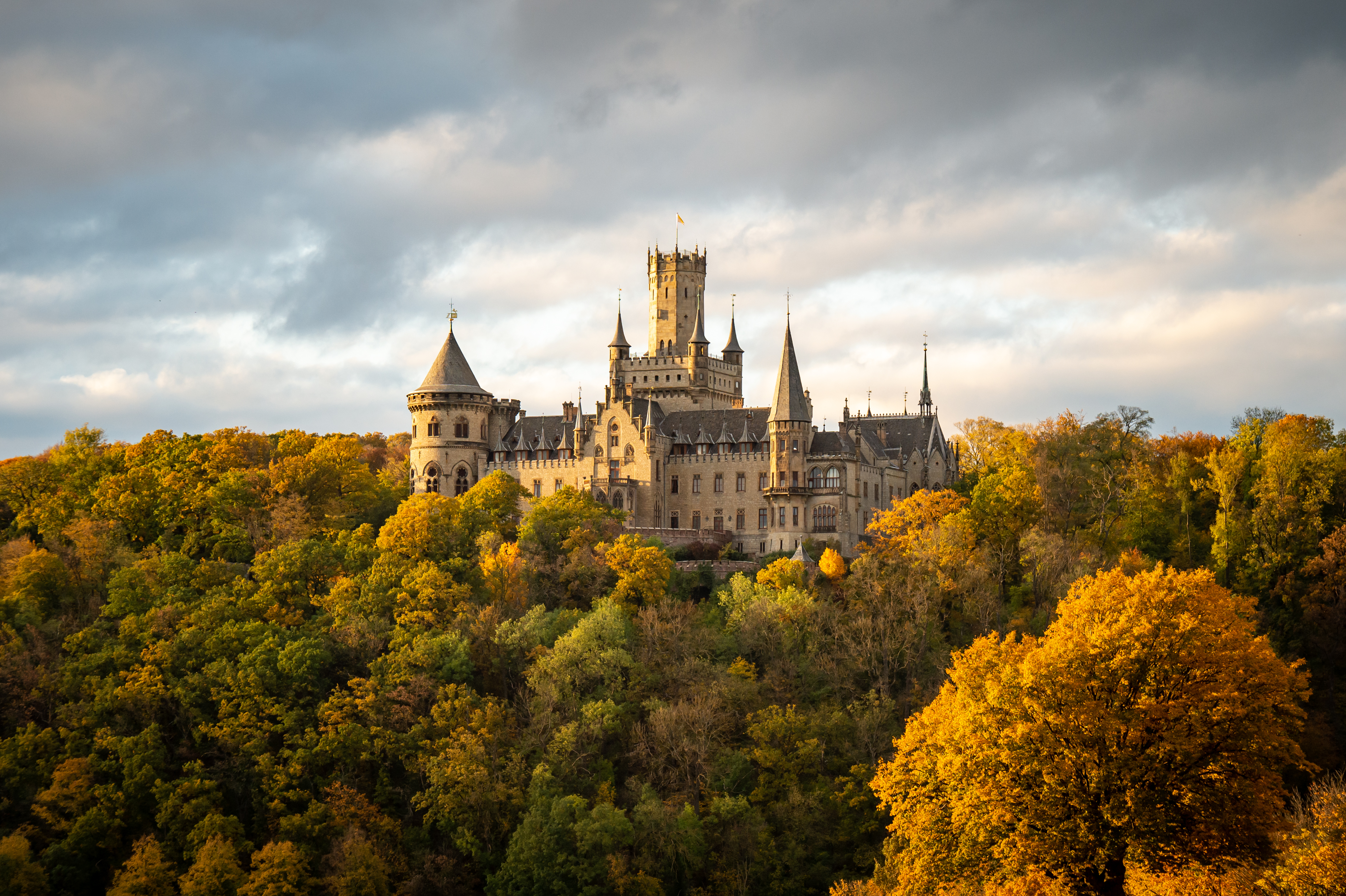
- Southeast view of Marienburg Castle in autumn

General information
- Status: Closed for renovations until 2030
- Architectural style: Gothic revival
- Location: Marienberg 1, 30982 Pattensen, Germany
- Coordinates: 52°10′20″N 9°45′59″E
- Construction started: 1858
- Completed: 1867
- Owner: Marienburg Castle Foundation (Note: Chaired by former owner but publicly funded in part by the state of Lower Saxony.)

Design and construction
- Architects: Conrad Wilhelm Hase; Edwin Oppler

Other information
- Public transit: Nordstemmen station: RE 2; RB 77

Website
- www.schloss-marienburg.de

Marienburg Castle is a Gothic Revival castle in Lower Saxony, Germany. It is located 15 kilometres (9.3 mi) north-west of Hildesheim, and around 30 kilometres (19 mi) south of Hanover, in the municipality of Pattensen. A summer residence of the House of Welf in the past, it is now owned by the Marienburg Castle Foundation chaired by former owner Ernst August of Hanover but publicly funded in part by the state of Lower Saxony.

== History ==
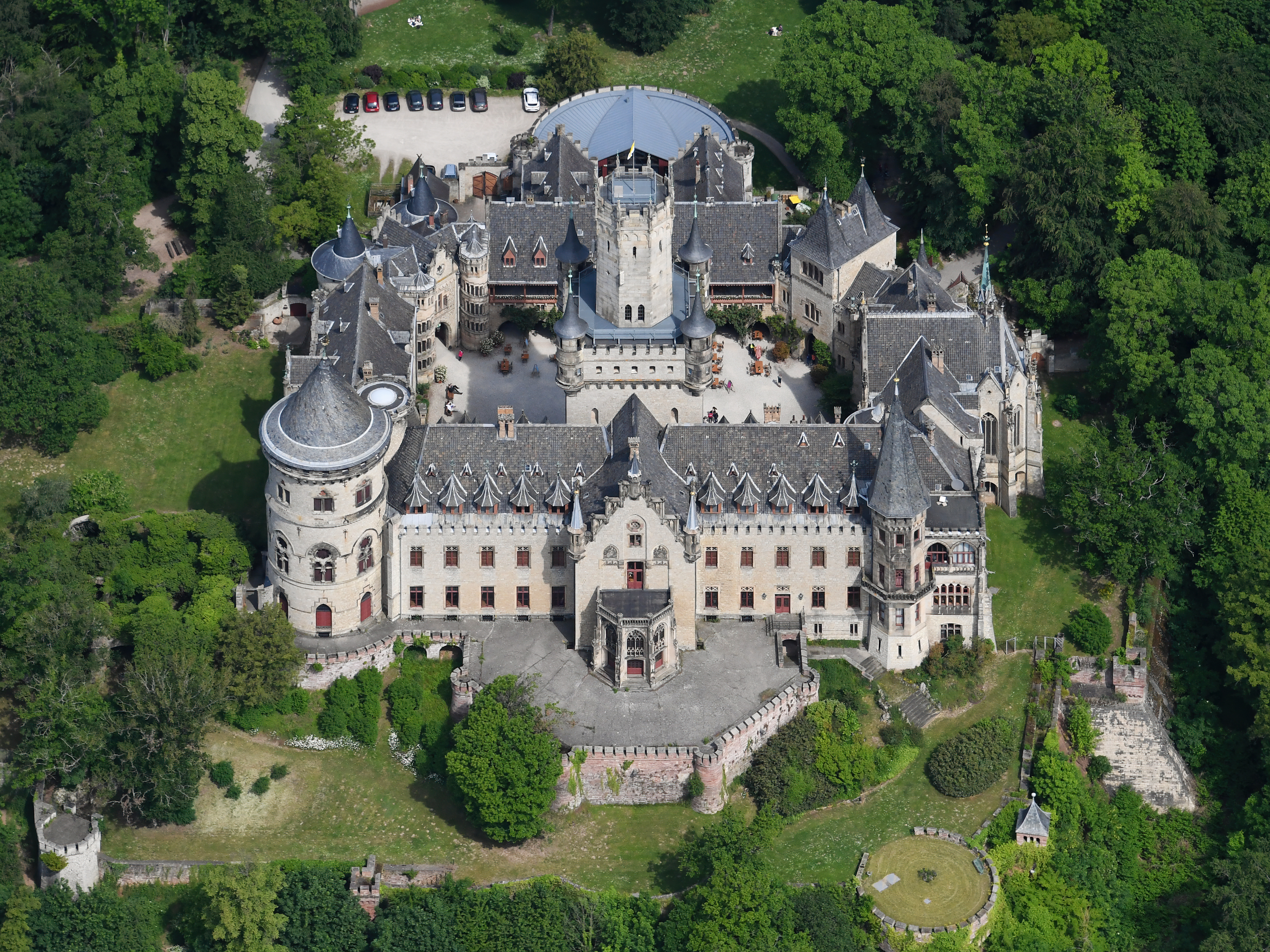
Aerial view from the south

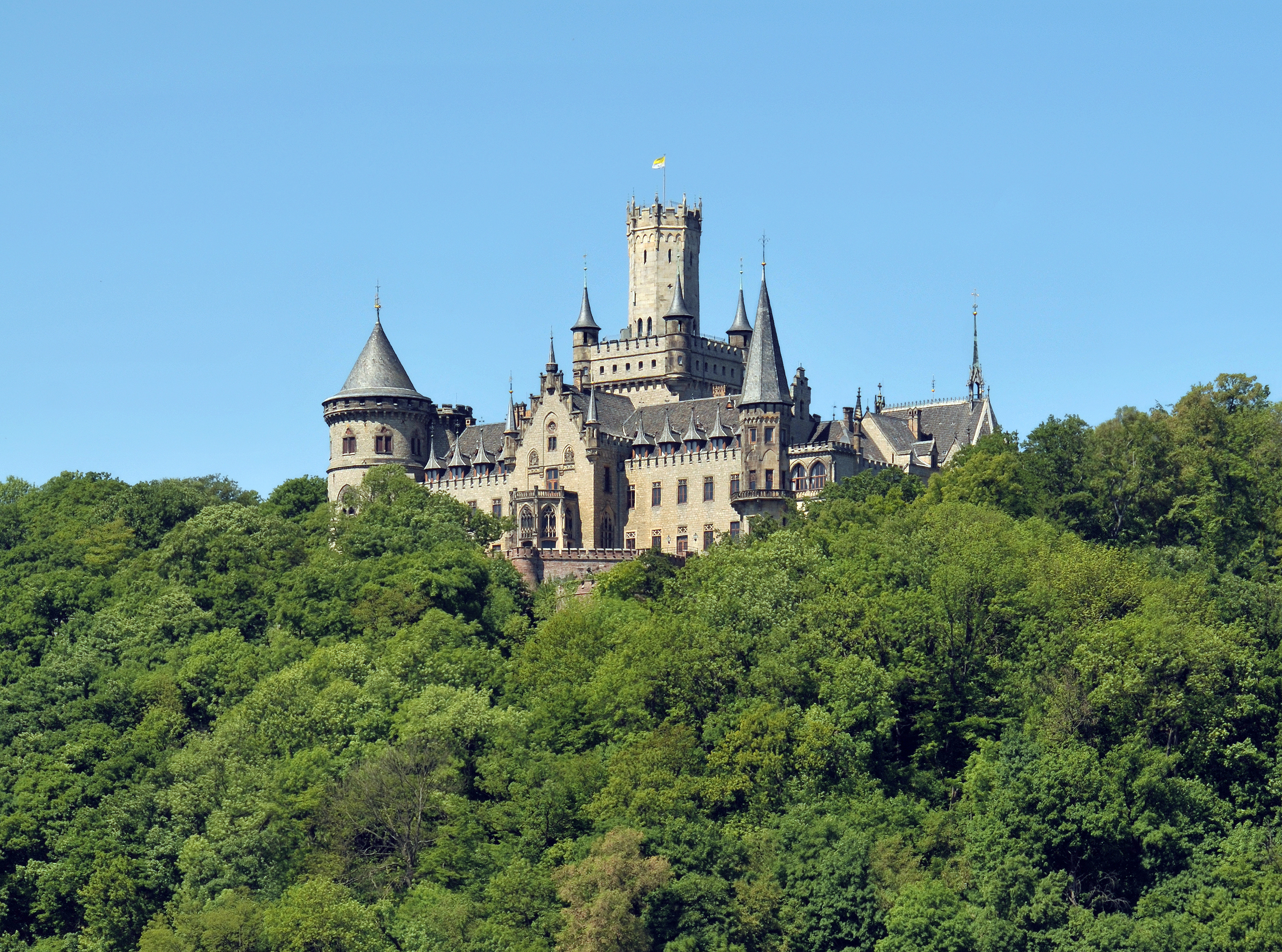
Marienburg Castle

The castle was built between 1858 and 1867 as a birthday present by George V of Hanover to his wife, Marie of Saxe-Altenburg. Between 1714 and 1837 there was virtually no royal court in Hanover as the House of Hanover ruled the kingdoms of Hanover and Britain by personal union at the time, and so the castle was also built to serve as a suitable summer seat for the House of Hanover in Germany, besides the Leine Palace and Herrenhausen Palace in Hanover.

Its architects were Conrad Wilhelm Hase, one of Hanover's most influential architects, and Edwin Oppler. When Prussia annexed Hanover in 1866 after the battle of Langensalza, the royal family emigrated to Gmunden in Austria, leaving the castle uninhabited for almost 80 years. Consequently, Marienburg is well preserved, as few renovation occurred until the no-longer royal family moved back in late 1945, decades after the German revolution and proclamation of the republic at the end of World War I. Ernest Augustus and his wife Viktoria Luise moved to Marienburg from Blankenburg Castle, just a few days before it became part of the Soviet occupation zone at the end of World War II. In 1954 their son, Ernest Augustus IV, opened the castle museum after having moved to nearby Calenberg Demesne.

== The castle today ==
The castle was owned by Ernst August, after his father signed it over to him in 2004, together with all other royal properties at Hanover and Gmunden. The castle housed the property management offices of the House of Hanover and served as its official seat. Parts of it were open to the public, such as the castle museum, the restaurant and the chapel, and could be booked as a location for events such as weddings, receptions and concerts. In 2010 the youth series In Your Dreams was filmed in the castle. Additionally, the German Prime Video show Maxton Hall - The World Between Us [Die Welt zwischen uns] (2024-2026) was filmed here.

In 2014, Ernst August lent a number of paintings and objects to the Lower Saxony state exhibition When the Royals came from Hanover – The rulers of Hanover on England's throne, an exhibition taking place in five museums and castles, under the protectorate of King Charles III, then-Prince of Wales. Of more than 1000 items, 30 had been contributed by Queen Elizabeth II, including the State Crown of George I, while Ernst August provided the king's Augsburg silver throne and other silver furniture of 1720, as well as the Hanoverian crown jewels. He hosted a parallel exhibition, The Way to the Crown, at Marienburg Castle until the end of 2016, showing, among other items such as the silver furniture, the crown jewels of the Kingdom of Hanover. On 6 July 2017, Ernst August hosted his wedding ball in the castle.

In November 2018, Ernst August announced the intended sale of the castle for a symbolic sales price of €1 to the Hanover Monastic Chamber, as he could not sustain its repair and maintenance costs. Renovation costs of the castle, partly infested with dry rot and at risk of collapsing, were estimated at €27 million at the time. The Hanover Monastic Chamber, a foundation of the state of Lower Saxony, owns most of the secularized monasteries and ecclesiastical estates of the former Kingdom of Hanover. Created by Ernst August's family in 1569, the foundation was to undertake the necessary renovations. The remaining art collection was planned to be kept in the castle, with parts purchased by the state, parts kept by the family and lent to the state, and parts transferred to a foundation controlled by both the family and the state. However, the transaction never completed due to legal action by his father to regain ownership, although the legal action failed. Instead, the castle became the property of the Marienburg Castle Foundation on 2 October 2020, and as of 2024 is closed for renovations expected to take until 2030.

== Gallery ==
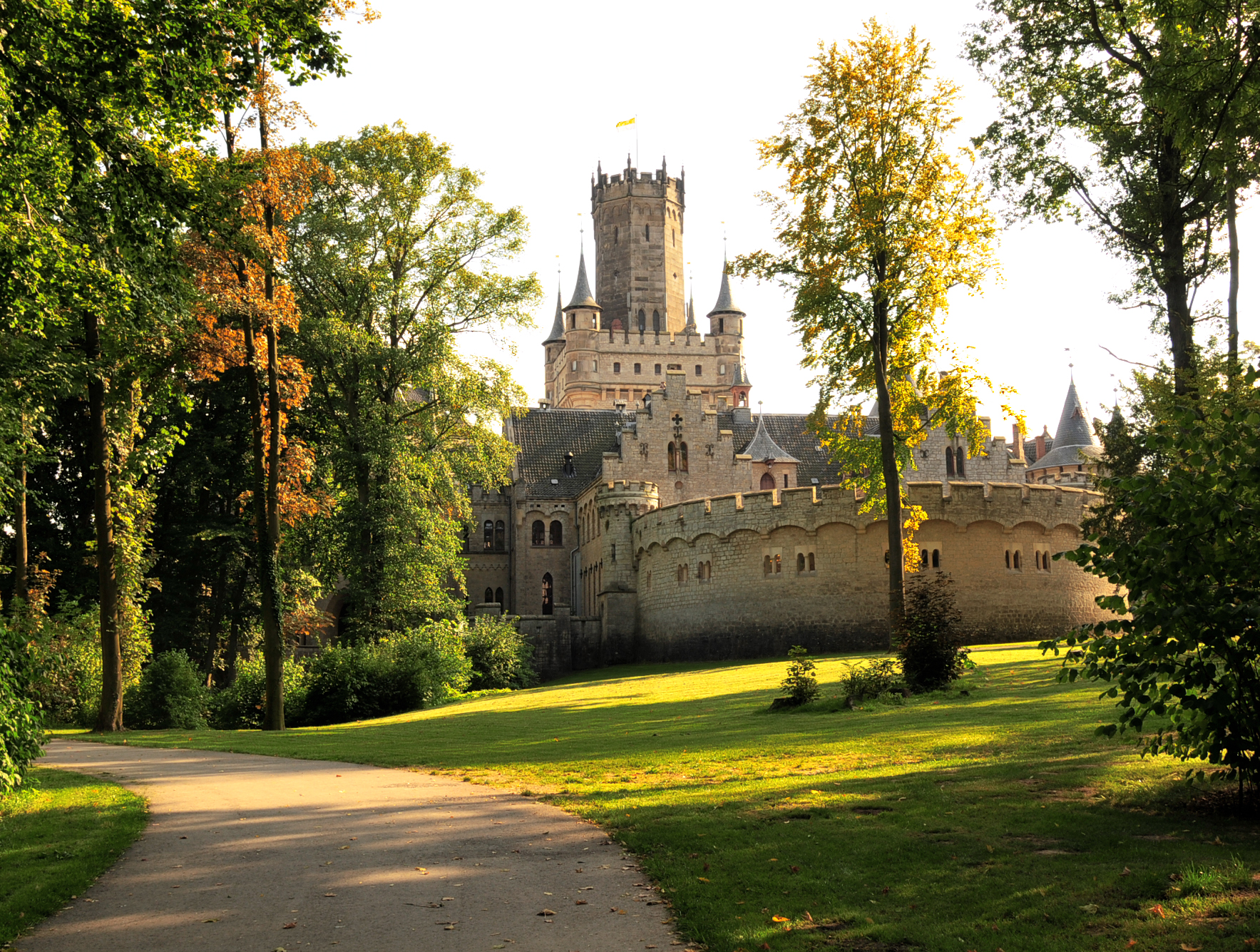
View from the north side

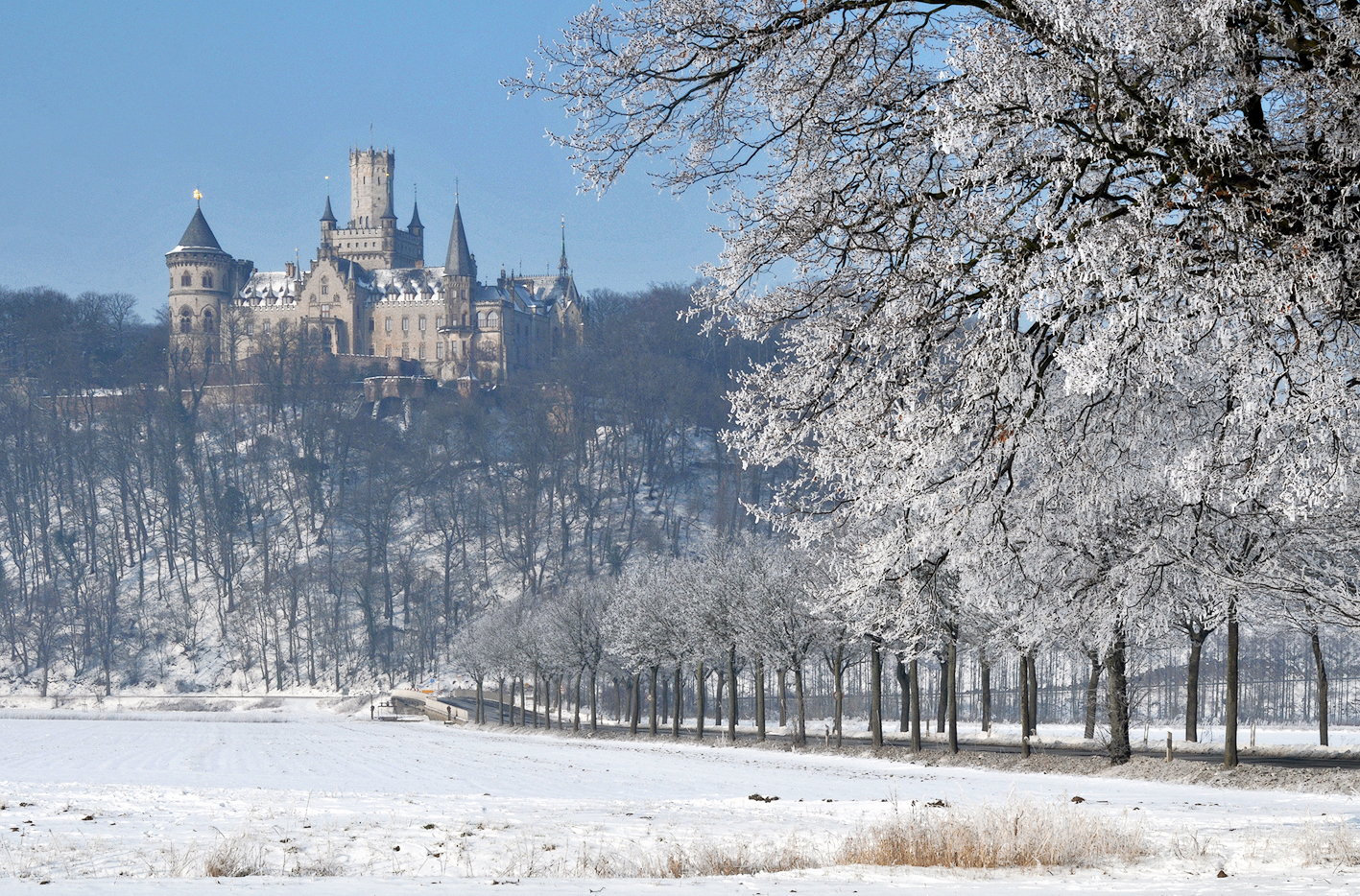
View from the south in winter

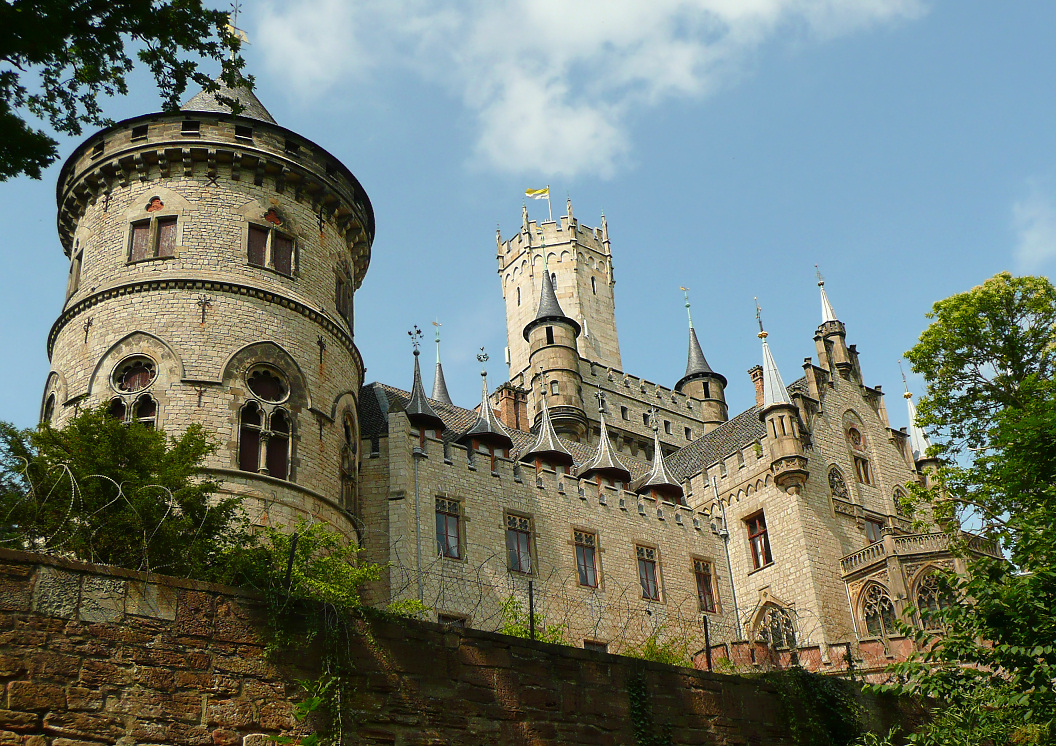
Closeup of the roof designs

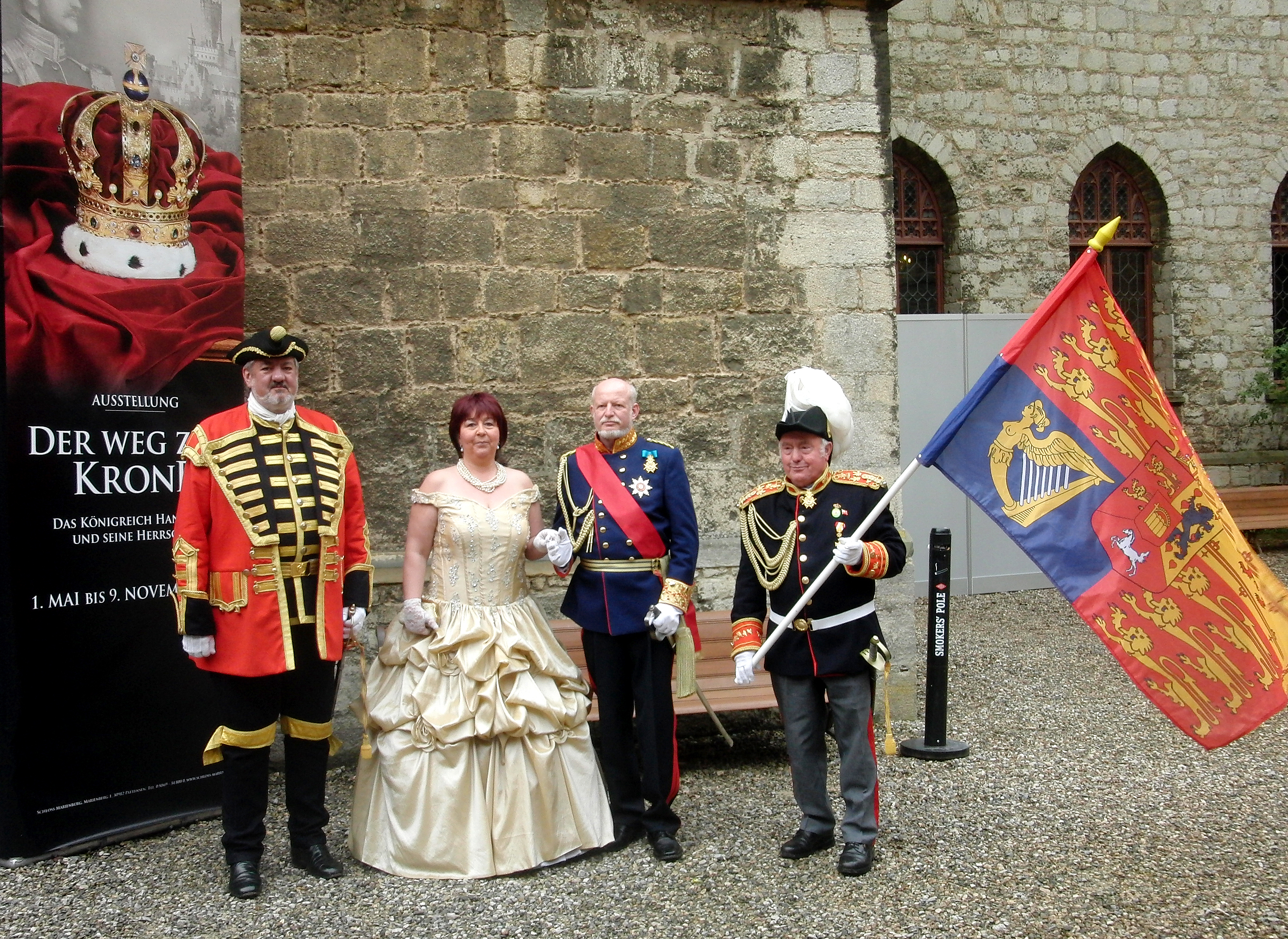
Opening of the exhibition The Way to the Crown in 2014
