= Princess Frederica of Hanover =

Hanoverian princess (1848–1926)

- Baroness von Pawel-Rammingen
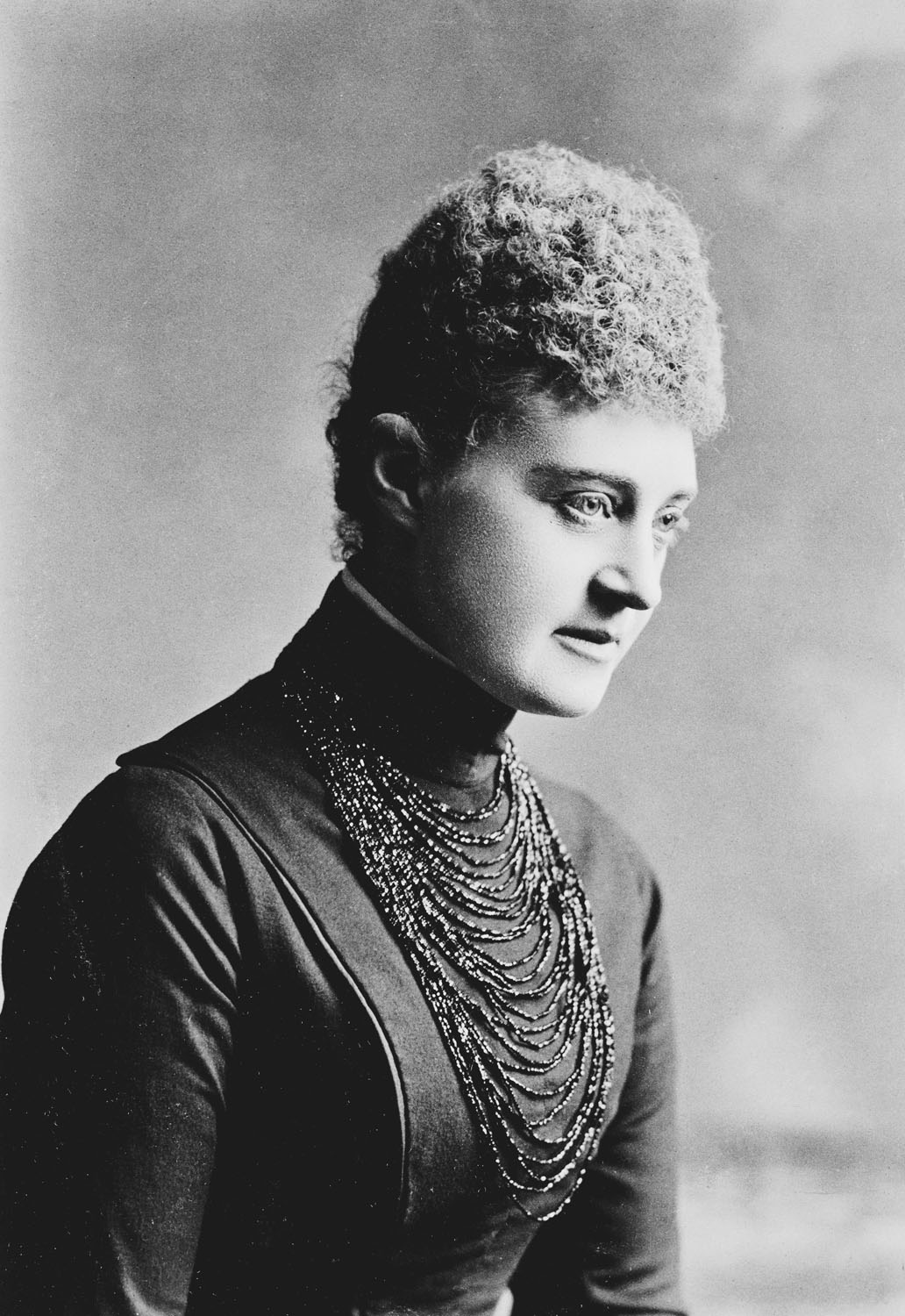
- Princess Frederica, c. 1885
- Born: 9 January 1848; Hanover
- Died: 16 October 1926 (aged 78); Biarritz, France
- Burial: 18 November 1926; Royal Vault, St George's Chapel, Windsor Castle
- Spouse: Baron Alphons von Pawel-Rammingen (m. 1880)
- Issue: Baroness Victoria Georgina Beatrice
Names
- German: Friederike Sophie Marie Henriette Amelie Therese; English: Frederica Sophie Marie Henrietta Amelia Theresa
- House: Hanover
- Father: George V of Hanover
- Mother: Marie of Saxe-Altenburg

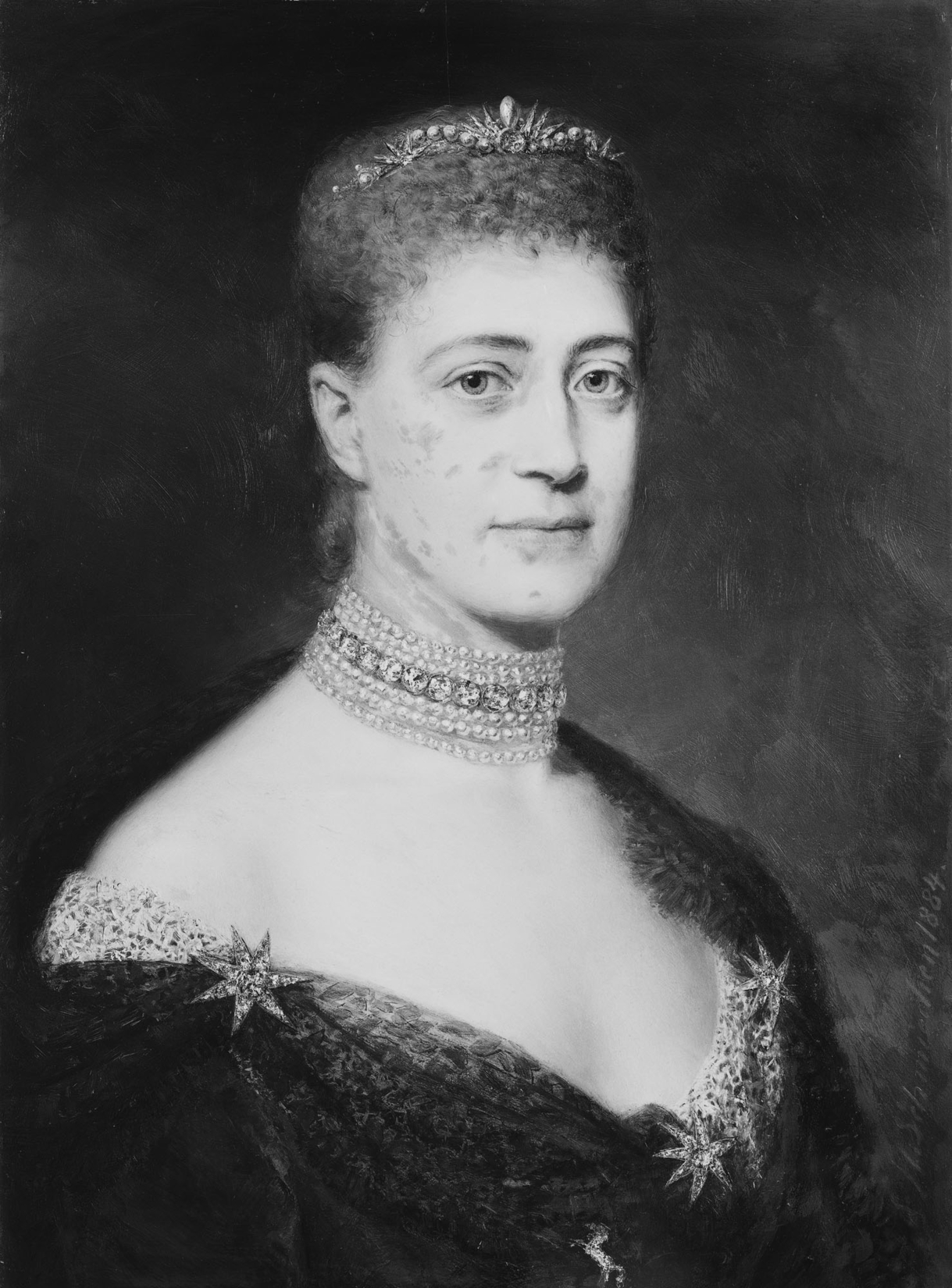
Portrait of Princess Frederica of Hanover, painted by Hermann Schmiechen in 1884, Royal Collection

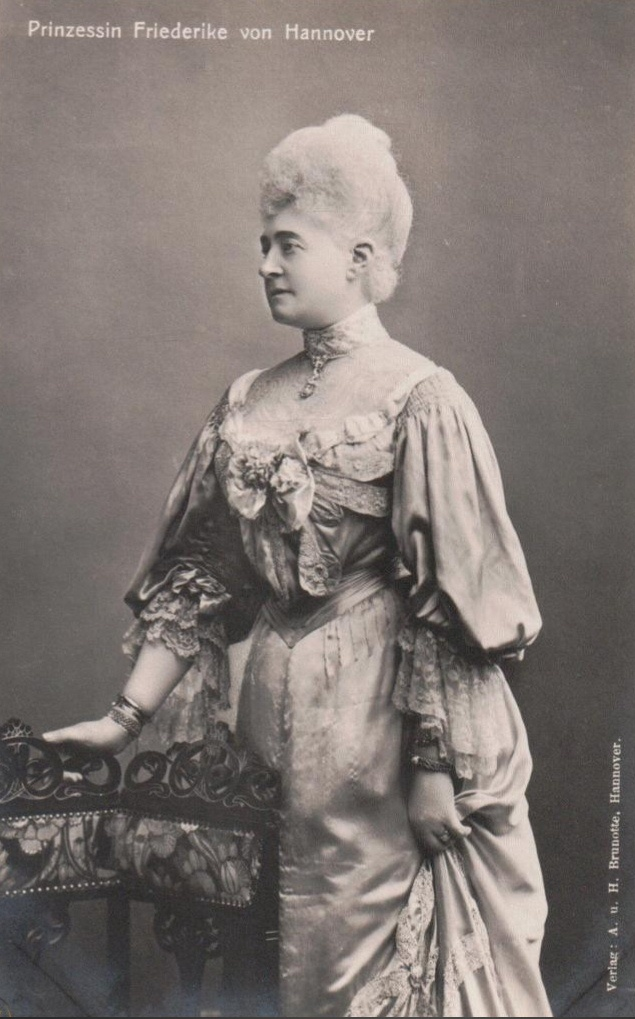
Photo portrait of Princess Frederica, circa 1910

Princess Frederica of Hanover (Friederike Sophie Marie Henriette Amelie Therese; 9 January 1848 – 16 October 1926) was a member of the House of Hanover. After her marriage, she lived mostly in England, where she was a prominent member of society.

== Early life ==
Frederica was born 9 January 1848 in Hanover, the elder daughter of the Hereditary Prince of Hanover (later King George V of Hanover) and of his wife, Princess Marie of Saxe-Altenburg. She held the title of Princess with the style Her Royal Highness in Hanover. In the United Kingdom, she held the title of Princess with the style Her Highness as a male-line great-granddaughter of King George III. She was known as "Lily" within her family.

In January 1866, the Prime Minister of Prussia Otto von Bismarck began negotiations with Hanover, represented by Count Adolf Ludwig von Platen-Hallermund (1814-1889), regarding the possible marriage of Frederica to Prince Albrecht of Prussia. These plans came to nothing as tensions grew between Hanover and Prussia finally resulting in the Austro-Prussian War (14 June – 23 August 1866).

In 1866, Frederica's father was deposed as King of Hanover. Eventually, the family settled at Gmunden in Austria, where they owned Schloss Cumberland (named for the British Ducal title held by Frederica's father). Frederica visited England with her family in May 1876, and again, after her father's death, in June 1878.

== Marriage ==
Frederica was courted by her second cousin, Prince Leopold, Duke of Albany (with whom she later became lifelong friends and confidants), and by Alexander, Prince of Orange. Frederica, however, was in love with Baron Alfons von Pawel-Rammingen (1843–1932), the son of a government official of the Duchy of Saxe-Coburg and Gotha. Alfons had served as an equerry to Frederica's father. Alfons was naturalised as a British subject on 19 March 1880 and, on 24 April 1880, he and Frederica were married. The wedding took place in at St George's Chapel, Windsor Castle, performed by the Bishop of Oxford. Alfons' sister, Baroness Anna von Pawel-Rammingen (1842-1920), was married to Baron Oswald Viktor von Coburg (1822–1904), the son of Ludwig Frederick Emil Freiherr von Coburg (1779–1827), himself an illegitimate son of Prince Ludwig Karl Friedrich of Saxe-Coburg-Saalfeld (1755–1806), third son of Ernest Frederick, Duke of Saxe-Coburg-Saalfeld.

Alfred Tennyson, the Poet Laureate, wrote a quatrain in honour of Frederica's marriage, focusing on her relationship to her blind father, who had died two years before:

O you that were eyes and light to the King till he passed away
From the darkness of life —
He saw not his daughter — he blest her: the blind King sees you to-day,
He blesses the wife.

After their marriage Frederica and Alfons lived in an apartment at Hampton Court Palace. The apartment was in the south-west wing of the west front of the palace in the suite formerly called the "Lady Housekeeper's Lodgings". Frederica and Alfons had one daughter, who was born at Hampton Court Palace and died days later:

- Baroness Victoria Georgina Beatrice Maud Anne von Pawel-Rammingen (7 March 1881 – 27 March 1881). She was buried in the Albert Memorial Chapel in St George's Chapel at Windsor Castle.

Frederica and Alfons were frequent guests at Windsor Castle and at Osborne House.

== Charitable works ==
Frederica was involved with numerous charitable activities.

In August 1881 she established the Convalescent Home, an institution for poor women who have given birth but have been discharged from maternity hospitals. Because her father had been blind, she was a benefactress of the Royal Normal College and Academy of Music for the Blind at Upper Norwood.

Frederica was interested in children and became patron of the Church Extension Association, then based in Kilburn, which wished to set up schools in Willesden, then a new suburb of London. On 24 July 1889 she opened Princess Frederica School in Kensal Rise.

She was also patron of the Training College for Teachers of the Deaf at Ealing, of the Strolling Players' Amateur Orchestral Society, of the Hampton Court and Dittons Regatta of the Home for Foreign Governesses, of the Mission to the French in London, and of the Royal Society for the Prevention of Cruelty to Animals. She was President of the Middlesex Branch of the Soldiers' and Sailors' Families Association.

== Later life and death ==
Frederica and Alfons gave up their apartment at Hampton Court Palace in 1898. While they continued to live part of the year in England, they subsequently spent more time in Biarritz in France where they had previously vacationed. They owned Villa Mouriscot there.

Frederica died in 1926 at Biarritz. She was buried in the Royal Vault in St George's Chapel at Windsor Castle. Her will was sealed in London in 1927. Her estate was valued at £85 (or £3,700 in 2022 when adjusted for inflation). In 1927 a window in her memory was unveiled in the English Church in Biarritz.

== Ancestry ==
Ancestors of Princess Frederica of Hanover

8. George III of the United Kingdom
4. Ernest Augustus, King of Hanover
9. Duchess Charlotte of Mecklenburg-Strelitz
2. George V of Hanover
10. Charles II, Grand Duke of Mecklenburg-Strelitz
5. Duchess Frederica of Mecklenburg-Strelitz
11. Princess Friederike of Hesse-Darmstadt
1. Princess Frederica of Hanover
12. Frederick, Duke of Saxe-Altenburg
6. Joseph, Duke of Saxe-Altenburg
13. Duchess Charlotte Georgine of Mecklenburg-Strelitz
3. Princess Marie of Saxe-Altenburg
14. Duke Louis of Württemberg
7. Duchess Amelia of Württemberg
15. Princess Henriette of Nassau-Weilburg
