= Gmunden =

- Municipality
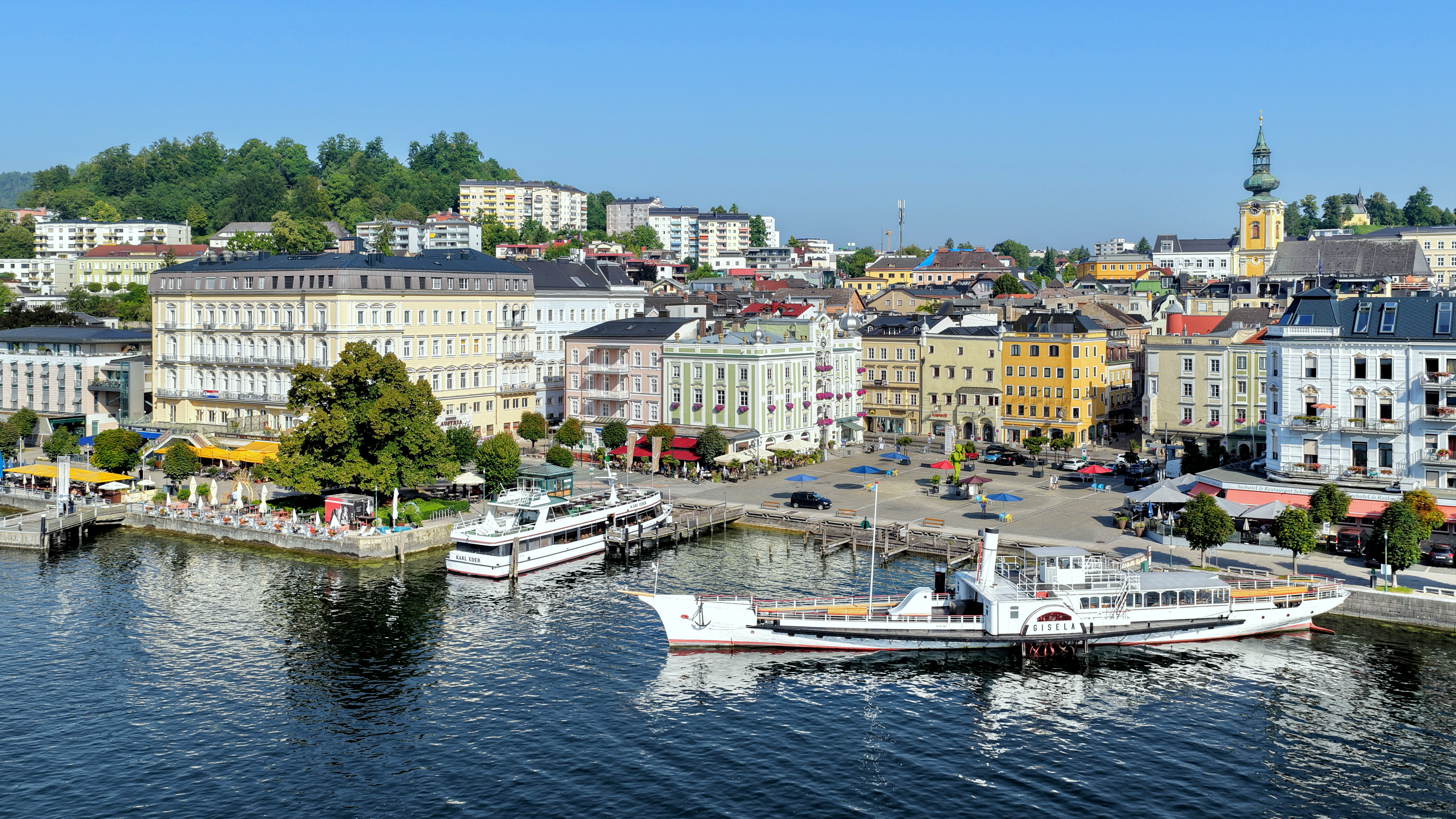
- Southeast view of the town center of Gmunden

- Coat of arms

- Location within Austria
- Coordinates: 47°55′05″N 13°47′58″E
- Country: Austria
- State: Upper Austria
- District: Gmunden

Government
  - Mayor: Stefan Krapf (ÖVP)

Area
  - Total: 63.52 km^{2} (24.53 sq mi)
- Elevation: 425 m (1,394 ft)

Population (2018-01-01)
  - Total: 13,191
  - Density: 207.7/km^{2} (537.9/sq mi)
- Time zone: UTC+1 (CET)
  - Summer (DST): UTC+2 (CEST)
- Postal code: 4810
- Area code: 07612
- Vehicle registration: GM
- Website: www.gmunden.ooe.gv.at

Gmunden (German: [ˈɡmʊndn̩]) is a town in Upper Austria, in the district of Gmunden. It has 13,204 inhabitants (estimates 2016).

== Geography ==
Gmunden covers an area of 63.49 square kilometres (24.51 sq mi) and has a median elevation of 425 metres (1,394 ft). It is situated next to the lake Traunsee on the Traun River and is surrounded by high mountains, including the Traunstein (5,446 feet; 1,660 m), the Erlakogel (5,150 feet; 1,570 m), the Wilder Kogel (6,860 feet; 2,090 m) and the Höllengebirge.

The municipality of Gmunden is divided into five boroughs: Gmunden, Gmunden-Ort, Schlagen, Traundorf and Unterm Stein.

=== Neighboring municipalities ===
	Ohlsdorf	Gschwandt
Pinsdorf		Sankt Konrad
Altmünster	Ebensee

== Population ==
As of 2001, Gmunden had a population of 13,336; Approximately 88.4% were Austrian by nationality, 1.5% are from other European Union states, and 10.2% are other foreigners. Largest non-EU minorities were from Bosnia and Herzegovina (3.6%) and the former FR Yugoslavia (i.e. present-day Serbia, Montenegro, Kosovo; 2.7%), followed by Turks (1.2%) and Germans (1.1%).

The majority (69.3%) are Roman Catholic by faith. Lutherans make up the largest minority at 7.3%, followed by 5.9% Muslims and 3.3% Eastern Orthodox. Approximately 10.3% are irreligious.

Gmunden's population
Year	Population	Year	Population
1869	c. 6,500	1951	12,894
1880	6,857	1961	12,518
1890	7,521	1971	12,331
1900	8,451	1981	12,653
1910	8,451	1991	13,133
1923	9,633	2001	13,184
1934	9,838	2011	13,086
1939	10,792	2016	13,204

== History ==
In 1000 BCE the Illyrians were mining salt here. A settlement was already in existence in the fifth century CE. By 1186 Gmunden was a fortified place surrounded by walls, although it did not receive a church until about 1300. In 1278 Gmunden became a town. On November 14, 1626, an army of rebellious peasants was completely defeated at Gmunden by General Pappenheim, who had been ordered by Maximilian I to suppress the peasant rebellion in Upper Austria. The dead peasant insurgents were buried in nearby Pinsdorf, where an obelisk styled memorial known as the Bauernhügel in their honour can still be seen.

Gmunden supplied naval ships to Austria during the 17th century and helped wounded soldiers in hospitals in World War I. During World War II, an SS maternity home was located here, "to insure racial purity" in accordance with Nazi racial theories.

In later years, it was much frequented as a health and summer resort, and had a variety of lake, brine, vegetable and pine-cone baths, a hydropathic establishment, inhalation chambers, whey cure, etc. It was also an important centre of the salt industry in Salzkammergut.

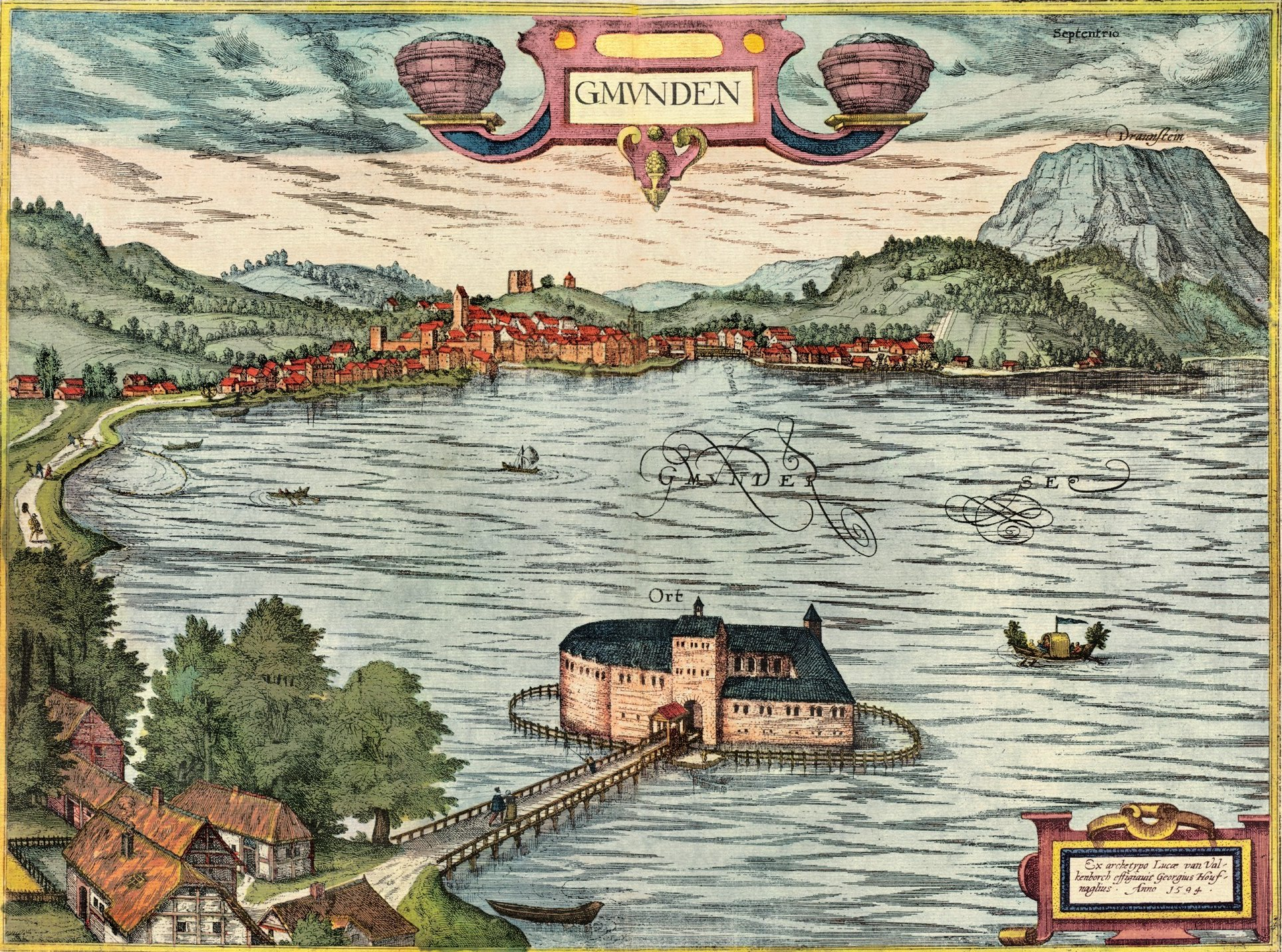
Gmunden in the 16th century

== Politics ==
The local council consists of 37 members. In the last municipal election in 2021, the following are seats won by the political parties: 16 ÖVP, 7 GRÜNE, 5 SPÖ, 5 FPÖ und 4 NEOS.

- ÖVP: 16 seats
- FPÖ: 5 seats
- SPÖ: 5 seats
- NEOS: 4 seats
- Die Grünen: 7 seats

Mayors:

- 1946–1955: Fritz Eiblhuber
- 1955–1956: Alfred Klimesch
- 1956–1973: Karl Piringer
- 1973–1979: Karl Sandmeier (1917-2000)
- 1979–1997: Erwin Herrmann
- 1997–2014: Heinz Köppl
- 2014– ... Stefan Krapf (ÖVP)

== Main sights ==
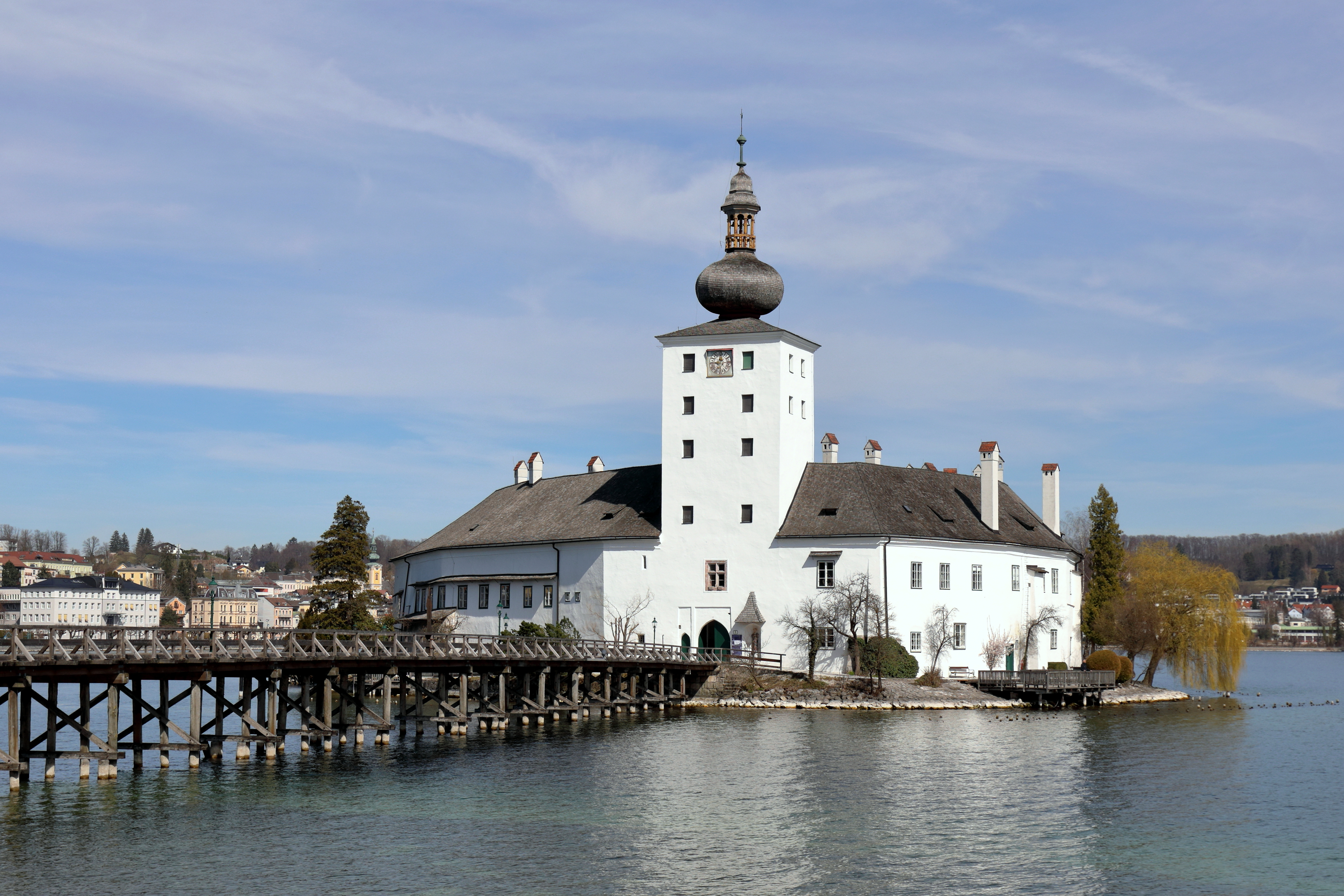
Ort Castle

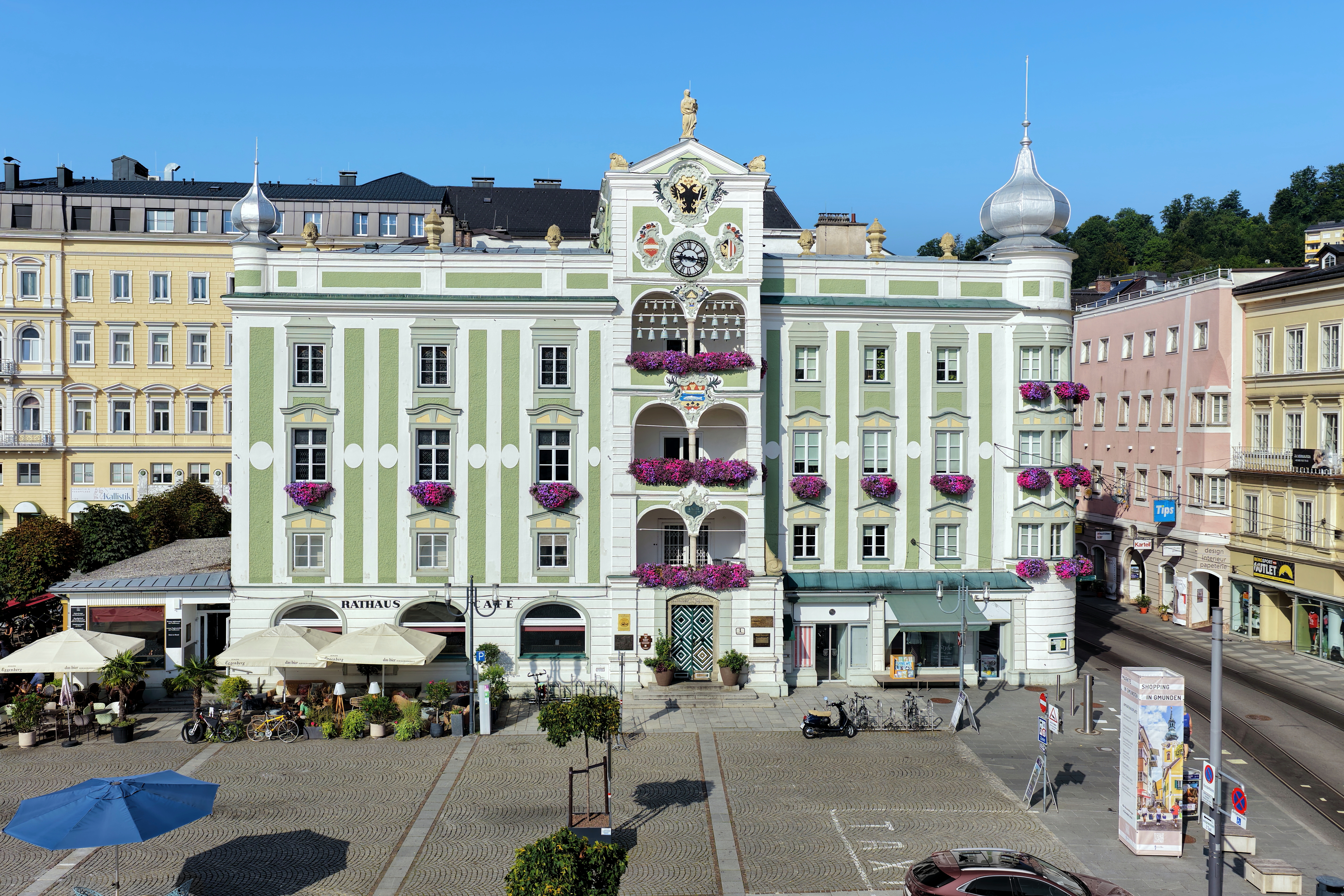
Town hall of Gmunden

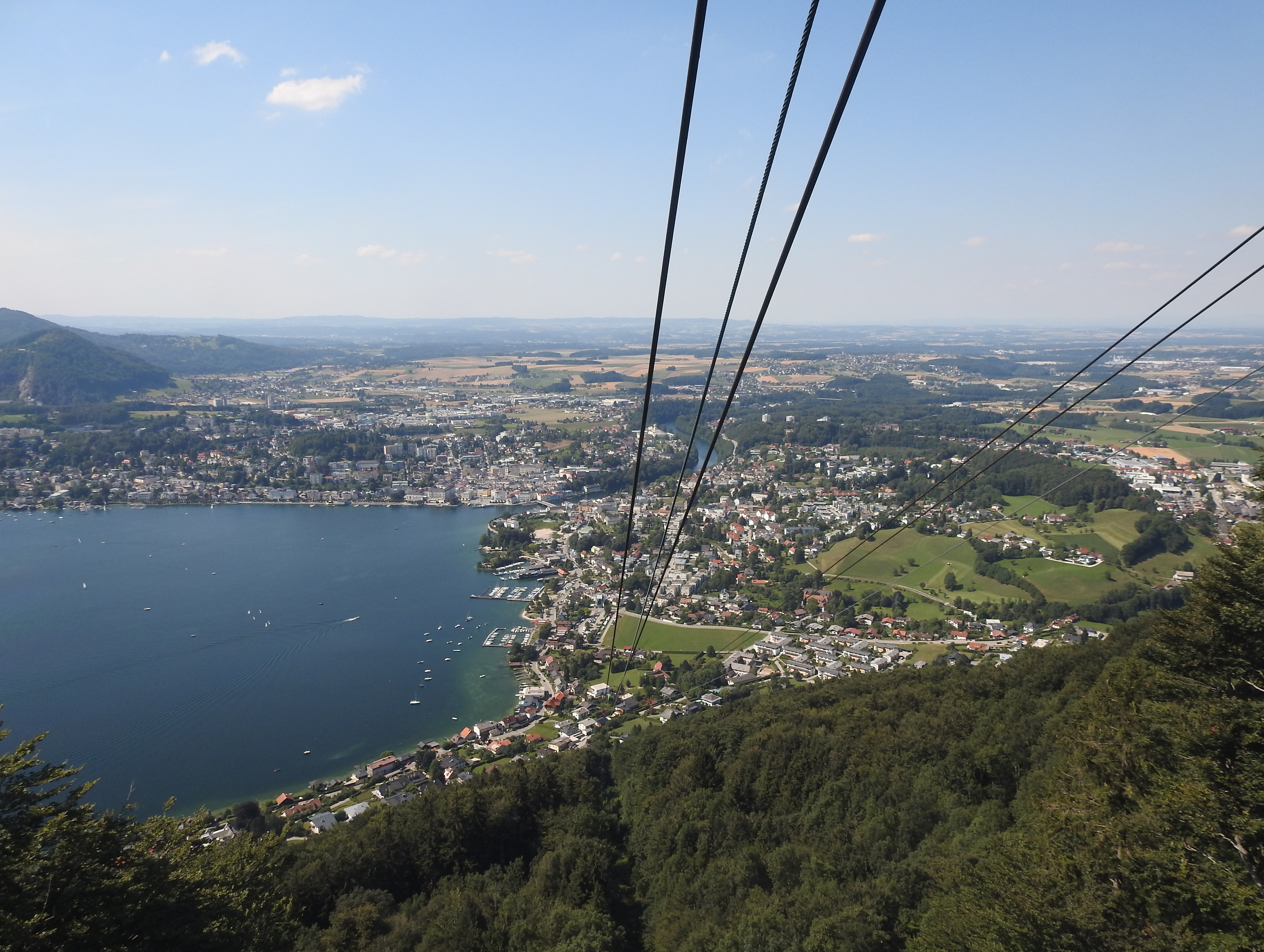
View of Gmunden

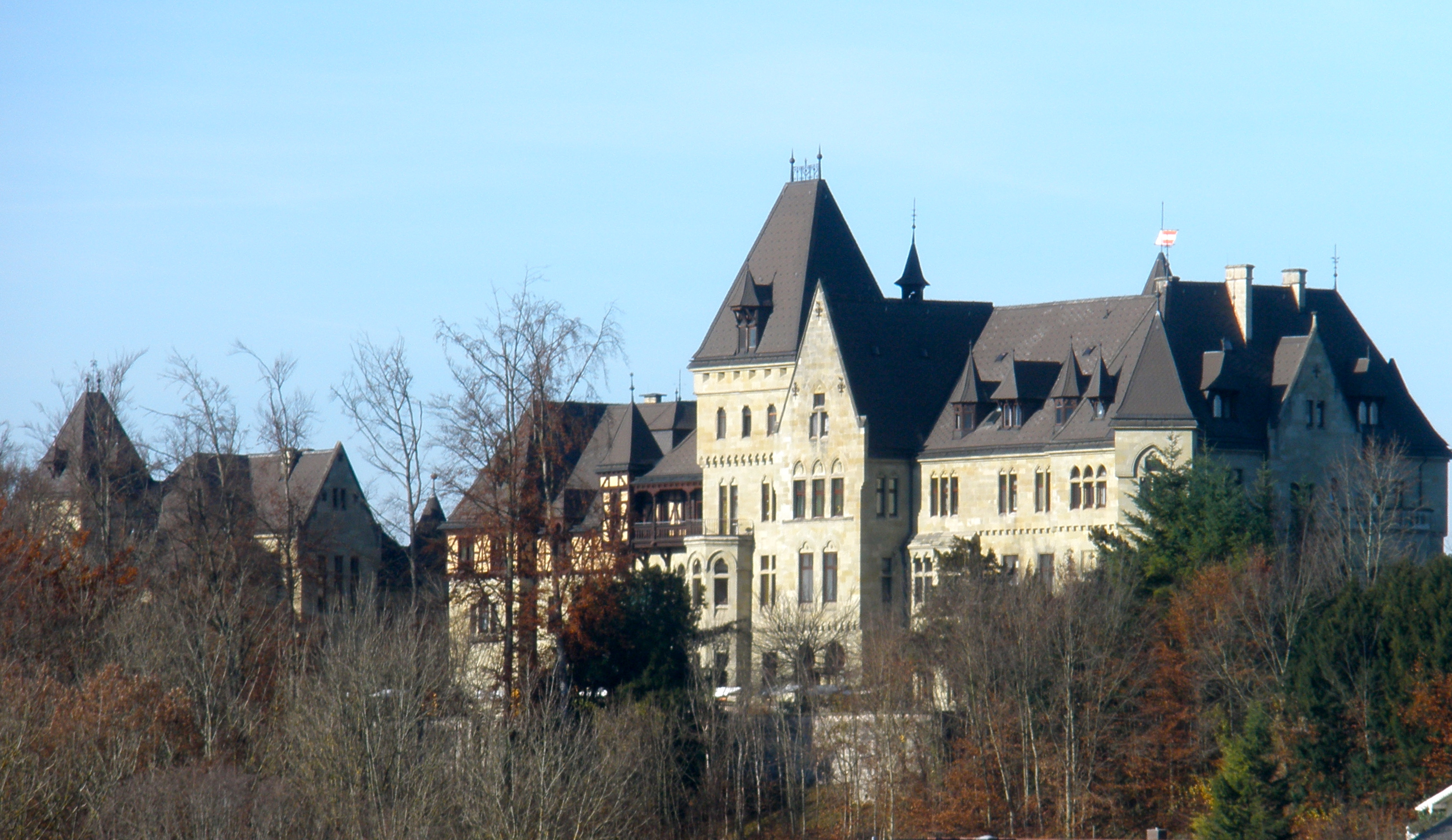
Cumberland Castle, built as exile seat for Ernest Augustus, Crown Prince of Hanover, 3rd Duke of Cumberland and Teviotdale, in 1882

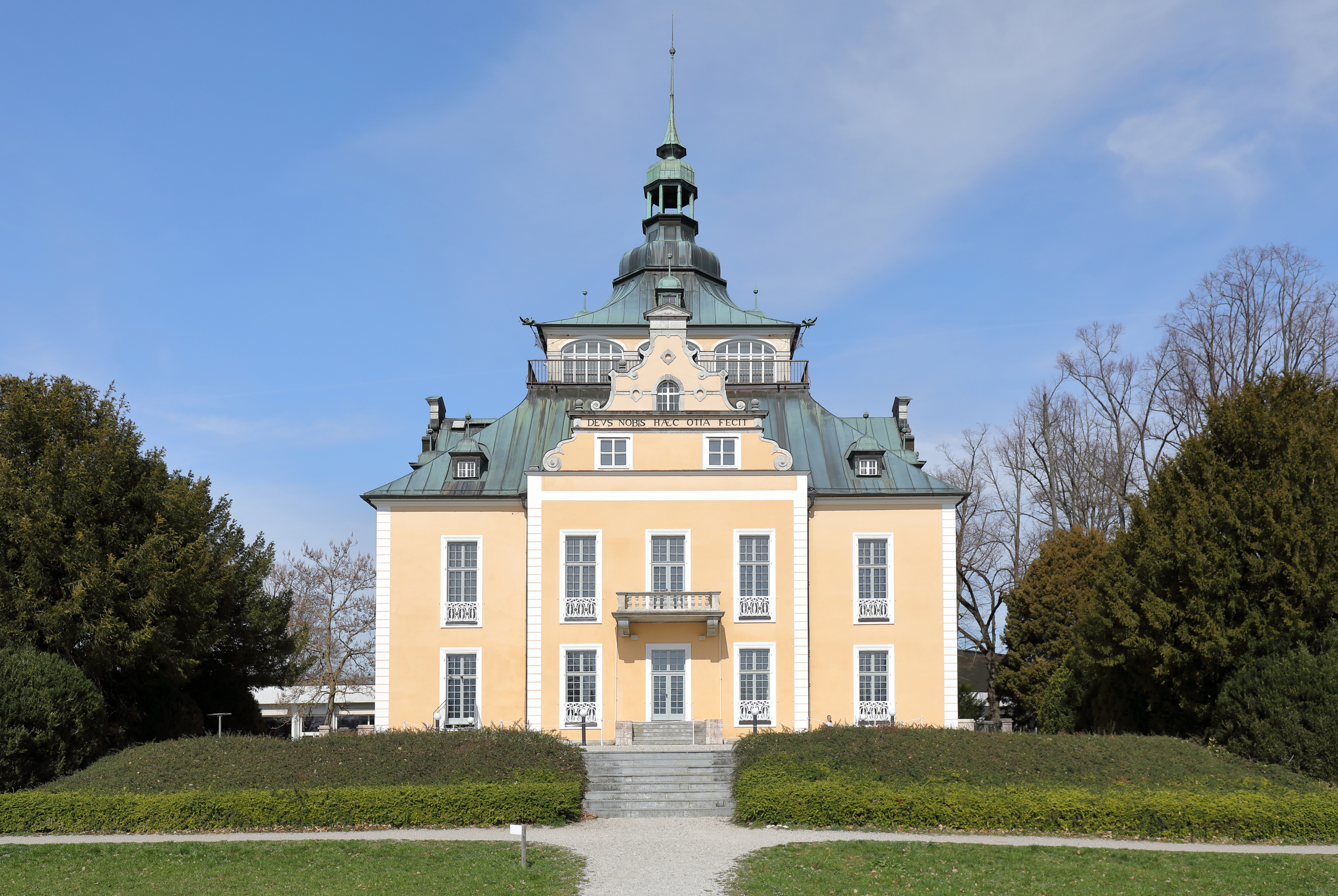
Villa Toscana, 1870-1912 exile seat of Maria Antonia, Grand Duchess of Tuscany, and her family

There are a great number of excursions and points of interest round Gmunden, notably the Traun Fall, 10 miles (16 km) north of Gmunden, a castle called Schloss Ort, and a ceramic factory producing Gmundner Keramik branded pottery. The town hall is also a popular tourist destination.

== Education ==
In Gmunden there are four kindergartens, four elementary schools and three Hauptschulen. The three high schools are BG/BRG Gmunden, BRG Schloss Traunsee, and Gymnasium Ort.

== Notable people ==
- Johannes von Gmunden (ca.1380/84 – 1442), an astronomer, mathematician and humanist.
- Karl Scherffer (1716–1783), an Austrian Jesuit mathematician and natural scientist.
- Caspar Erasmus Duftschmid (1767-1821), an Austrian naturalist and physician
- Matthias von Schönerer (1807–1881), an engineer and railway pioneer, worked locally
- Friedrich Theodor Vischer (1807–1887), novelist, poet and playwright, died locally.
- Carl Rahl (1812–1865), an Austrian painter, lived locally
- John Haswell (1812–1897), a Scottish engineer and locomotive designer, worked here
- Count Richard Belcredi (1823–1902), statesman, Minister-President, 1865 to 1867, died here
- Christian Griepenkerl (1839–1916), a German painter and professor, lived here
- Horaz Krasnopolski, (DE Wiki) (1842-1908), lawyer, died here
- William Heaton-Armstrong (1853–1917), a British Liberal Party politician and banker.
- Ludwig Bemelmans (1898–1962), an Austrian-American writer, grew up locally
- Walter Reder (1915–1991), an SS commander and war criminal, buried in Gmunden
- Alfred Hilbe (1928–2011), Prime Minister of Liechtenstein, 1970 to 1974.
- Thomas Bernhard (1931–1989), an Austrian novelist, playwright and poet
- Szörényi Levente, (HU wiki) (born 1945) lead singer of Hungarian rock band Illés
- Helmut Trawöger (born 1948), conductor and flautist
- Heinrich Schiff (1951–2016), cellist and conductor
- Christoph Ransmayr (born 1954), an Austrian writer, grew up locally
- Andreas Berger (born 1961), an Austrian former track and field sprinter
- Gabi Burgstaller (born 1963), an Austrian politician (SPÖ), and former Governess of Salzburg, went to local high school
- Jory Vinikour (born 1963), American born harpsichordist, worked as a teacher nearby
- Conchita Wurst (born 1988), drag queen and winner of Eurovision Song Contest 2014

=== Aristocracy ===
- Princess Maria Antonia of the Two Sicilies (1814–1898), the Grand Duchess of Tuscany from 1833 to 1859, died locally
- Marie of Saxe-Altenburg (1818–1907), Queen of Hanover, 1851 to 1866, died in exile locally
- George V of Hanover (1819–1878), in 1868 he bought a local summer villa for his exile.
- Ernest Augustus, Crown Prince of Hanover (1845–1923), exiled and died locally
- Princess Frederica of Hanover (1848–1926), member of the House of Hanover, lived locally
- Princess Marie of Hanover (1849–1904), daughter of King George V of Hanover lived and died locally
- Princess Thyra of Denmark (1853–1933), daughter of Christian IX of Denmark, lived and died locally
- Archduchess Margarete Sophie of Austria (1870–1902), member of the House of Habsburg, died locally
- Princess Marie Louise of Hanover (1879–1948), child of Ernest Augustus, Crown Prince of Hanover
- Frederick Francis IV (1882–1945), the last Grand Duke of Mecklenburg, married locally
- Princess Alexandra of Hanover (1882-1963), the last consort of Mecklenburg-Schwerin, was born and married locally
- Ludwig Rudolph von Hannover, (1955–1988), a member of the House of Hanover, died locally

== See also ==
- Gmunden Straßenbahn, the town tramway.
