= Princess Marie of Hanover =

Hanovarian princess (1849–1904)

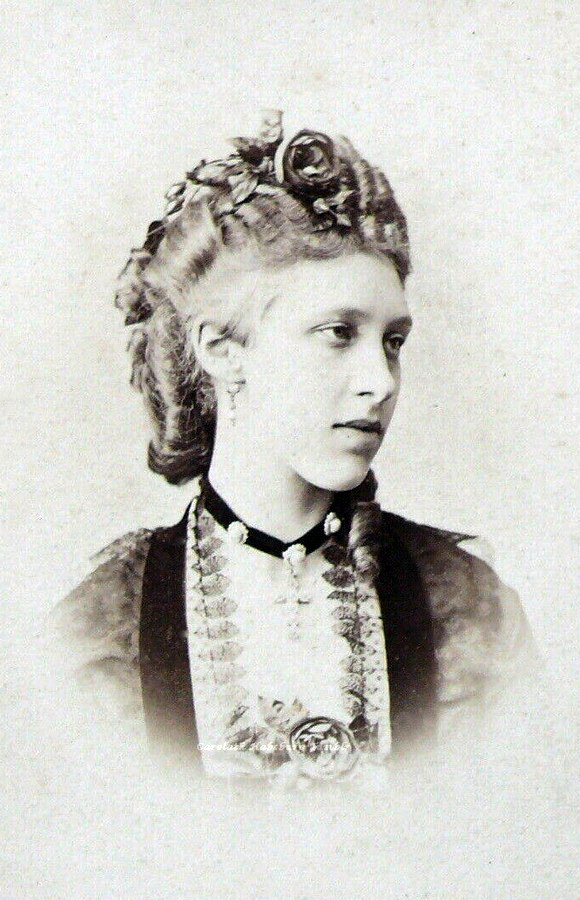
- Marie, c. 1870s
- Born: 2 December 1849; Hanover
- Died: 4 June 1904 (aged 54); Gmunden, Austria
- Burial: Gmunden, Austria-Hungary
Names
- Marie Ernestine Josephine Adolphine Henriette Therese Elisabeth Alexandrine
- House: Hanover
- Father: George V of Hanover
- Mother: Marie of Saxe-Altenburg

Princess Marie of Hanover (Marie Ernestine Josephine Adolphine Henriette Therese Elisabeth Alexandrine; 2 December 1849 – 4 June 1904) was the younger daughter of King George V of Hanover and his wife, Marie of Saxe-Altenburg.

== Biography ==
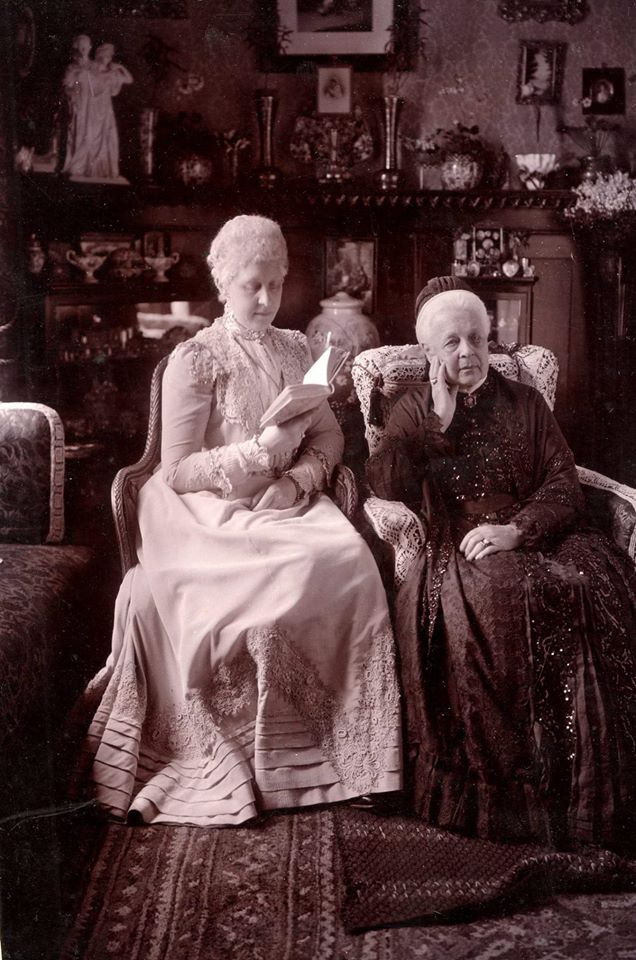
Princess Marie and her mother, Queen Marie of Hanover, postcard by Carl Jagerspacher, Gmunden 1904, with the original signature of "Marie R. (Regina)"

Marie was born in the city of Hanover. She held the title of Princess with the style of Royal Highness in the Kingdom of Hanover. In the United Kingdom, she held the title of Princess with the style Her Highness as a male line great-granddaughter of King George III.

In 1866 Marie's father was deposed as king of Hanover. Marie and her mother remained in Hanover for over a year, residing at Schloss Marienburg, until they went into exile in Austria in July 1867. Eventually the family settled at Gmunden.

=== Marriage prospects ===
In 1875 when Prince Arthur visited Gmunden he was smitten with Marie and when the Hanovers came to London at the end of May it would’ve been a perfect time to announce an engagement, however Marie did not wish to marry Arthur. In 1877 Arthur did a second try to win the hand of her and even spoke to her father, King George and they worked on an agreement that if Marie was to marry Arthur she would be promised that she would have no contact with his brother in law Crown Prince Frederick of Prussia and his uncle the Duke of Saxe-Coburg and Gotha. The agreement was made to “hardly ever” and George wrote to Marie about the solution. Marie responded that she did not love Arthur and therefore could not marry him. Her cousin Princess Mary Adelaide of Cambridge considered the rejection as an insult and called Marie a “selfish idiot”. Marie ended up never marrying.

=== Death ===
Marie died at Gmunden at the age of 54. Her funeral was the day after her death since two days later her niece Princess Alexandra of Hanover and Cumberland was scheduled to marry Grand Duke Friedrich Franz IV of Mecklenburg-Schwerin. Marie is buried in the family mausoleum at Schloss Cumberland next to her mother who outlived her by three years.

== Ancestry ==
Ancestors of Princess Marie of Hanover

8. George III of the United Kingdom
4. Ernest Augustus, King of Hanover
9. Duchess Charlotte of Mecklenburg-Strelitz
2. George V of Hanover
10. Charles II, Grand Duke of Mecklenburg-Strelitz
5. Duchess Frederica of Mecklenburg-Strelitz
11. Princess Friederike of Hesse-Darmstadt
1. Princess Marie of Hanover
12. Frederick, Duke of Saxe-Altenburg
6. Joseph, Duke of Saxe-Altenburg
13. Duchess Charlotte Georgine of Mecklenburg-Strelitz
3. Princess Marie of Saxe-Altenburg
14. Duke Louis of Württemberg
7. Duchess Amelia of Württemberg
15. Princess Henriette of Nassau-Weilburg
