= List of Hanoverian royal consorts =

Spouse of a Hanoverian monarch

Because of the Salic law of succession, all monarchs of Hanover were male, electors from 1692 until 1814 and kings from 1814 until 1866. Their wives were thus electresses and then queens.

== Electresses ==
Picture	Name	Father	Birth	Marriage	Became electress	Ceased to be electress	Death	Spouse
	Sophia of the Palatinate	Frederick V, Elector Palatine (Palatinate-Simmern)	14 October 1630	30 September 1658	1692 husband became designated elector	23 January 1698 husband's death	8 June 1714	Ernest Augustus
	Caroline of Ansbach	Johann Friedrich, Margrave of Brandenburg-Ansbach (Hohenzollern)	1 March 1683	22 August 1705	11 June 1727 husband's accession	20 Nov 1737		George II
	Charlotte of Mecklenburg-Strelitz	Duke Charles Louis Frederick of Mecklenburg (Mecklenburg)	19 May 1744	8 September 1761		12 October 1814 became queen consort	17 November 1818	George III

== Queens ==
Picture	Name	Father	Birth	Marriage	Became queen	Ceased to be queen	Death	Spouse
	Charlotte of Mecklenburg-Strelitz	Duke Charles Louis Frederick of Mecklenburg (Mecklenburg)	19 May 1744	8 September 1761	12 October 1814; Hanover raised to kingdom status	17 November 1818		George III
	Caroline of Brunswick	Charles II, Duke of Brunswick-Wolfenbüttel (Welf)	17 May 1768	8 April 1795	29 January 1820 husband's accession	7 August 1821		George IV
	Adelaide of Saxe-Meiningen	George I, Duke of Saxe-Meiningen (Saxe-Meiningen)	13 August 1792	13 July 1818	26 June 1830 husband's accession	20 June 1837 husband's death	2 December 1849	William
	Frederica of Mecklenburg-Strelitz	Charles II, Grand Duke of Mecklenburg (Mecklenburg)	3 March 1778	29 May 1815	20 June 1837 husband's accession	29 June 1841		Ernest Augustus
	Marie of Saxe-Altenburg	Joseph, Duke of Saxe-Altenburg (Saxe-Altenburg)	14 April 1818	18 February 1843	18 November 1851 husband's accession	20 September 1866 monarchy abolished	9 January 1907	George V
