= Baron Alphons von Pawel-Rammingen =

German-born nobleman (1843–1932)

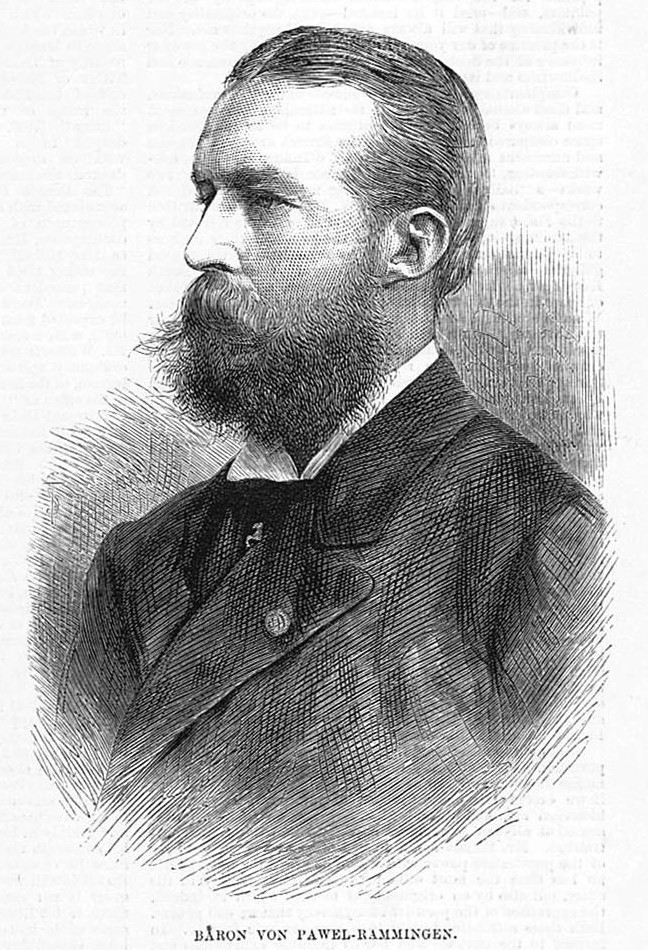
- Born: Luitbert Alexander Georg Lionel Alfons Freiherr von Pawel-Rammingen; 27 July 1843
- Died: 20 November 1932 (aged 89)
- Noble family: Pawel-Rammingen
- Spouse: Princess Frederica of Hanover (m. 1880; died 1926)
- Father: Karl Julius August Plato Emil, Baron von Pawel-Rammingen
- Mother: Luitgarde von Friesen

Baron Luitbert Alexander George Lionel Alphons von Pawel-Rammingen, KCB, KCVO, KCH, VD (German: Luitbert Alexander Georg Lionel Alfons Freiherr von Pawel-Rammingen; 27 July 1843 – 20 November 1932) was a German nobleman who became a naturalised British subject in 1880 when he married Princess Frederica of Hanover.

== Life ==
Pawel-Rammingen was born on 27 July 1843, the eldest son of Karl Julius August Plato Emil, Baron von Pawel-Rammingen (1807–1886) and his wife, Baroness Luitgarde von Friesen (1819-1901): he had an elder sister, Anna (1842-1920) who married in 1862 to Baron Oswald von Coburg (1822-1904), the son of Ludwig Frederick Emil Freiherr von Coburg (1779-1827), himself an illegitimate son of Prince Ludwig Karl Friedrich of Saxe-Coburg-Saalfeld (1755-1806). Alphons also had a younger brother, Baron Paul Julius August Plato Sylvester Albert (b. 1851; known commonly as Albert), who was married to a Hungarian noblewoman, Baroness Gizella Babárczy de Babárcz (1852-1879) and had issue.

Naturalization of Luitbert Rammingen Act 1880
- Act of Parliament
- Parliament of the United Kingdom
- Long title: An Act to naturalize Luitbert Alexander George Lionel Alphons Freiherr Von Pawel Rammingen, and to grant and confer on him all the rights, privileges, and capacities of a natural-born Subject of Her Majesty the Queen.
- Citation: 43 Vict. c. 1

Dates
- Royal assent: 19 March 1880

On 24 April 1880, Pawel-Rammingen married Princess Frederica Sophia Maria of Hanover, daughter of King George V of Hanover at St George's Chapel, Windsor; he became a naturalised British Subject by Act of Parliament on 19 March 1880 (she was also a British princess). In the same year, he was appointed a Knight Commander of the Order of the Bath (KCB) and in 1897, Queen Victoria also appointed him a Knight Commander of the Royal Victorian Order (KCVO). He was also appointed a Knight Commander of the Order of Hanover (KCH). In the United Kingdom, he was Honorary Colonel of the 6th Battalion of the Essex Regiment. Alfons and Frederica had one daughter who was born and died at Hampton Court Palace, where the couple had grace-and-favour apartment:

- Baroness Victoria Georgina Beatrice Maud Anne von Pawel-Rammingen (7 March 1881 – 27 March 1881). She was buried in the Albert Memorial Chapel in St George's Chapel at Windsor Castle.

== Death ==
He became a widower in 1926, and died in Biarritz on 20 November 1932, at the age of 89, outliving his spouse for 6 years. He was buried in the Du Sabaou cemetery, Biarritz, France, while his wife, Princess Frederica of Hanover, was buried alongside their daughter Victoria, in the Royal Vault, St.George's Chapel, Windsor, United Kingdom.
