= George V of Hanover =

King of Hanover from 1851 to 1866

George V
- Duke of Cumberland and Teviotdale
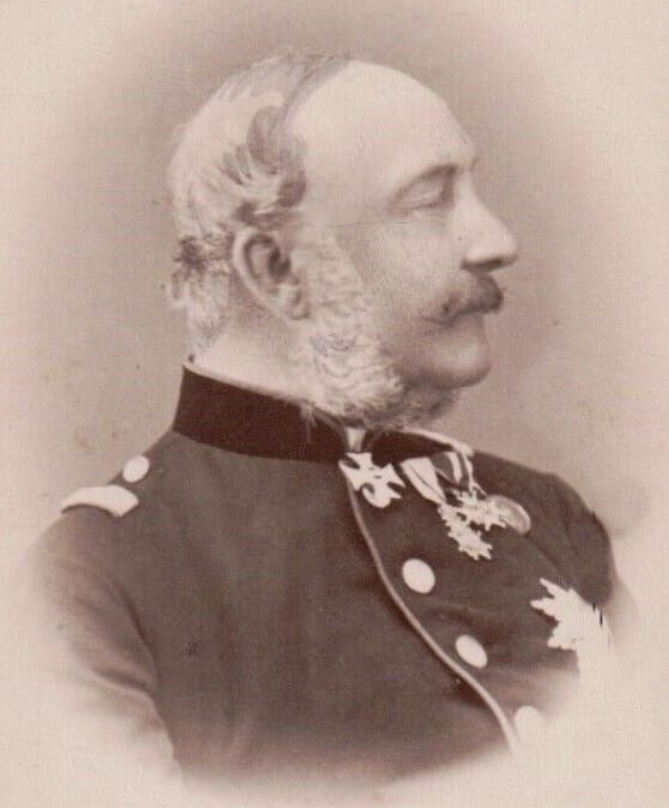
- George V, c. 1860s

King of Hanover
- Reign: 18 November 1851 – 20 September 1866
- Predecessor: Ernest Augustus
- Successor: Monarchy abolished

Head of the House of Hanover
- Pretence: 18 November 1851 – 12 June 1878
- Predecessor: Ernest Augustus
- Successor: Ernest Augustus, Crown Prince of Hanover
- Born: Prince George of Cumberland; 27 May 1819; Berlin, Kingdom of Prussia
- Died: 12 June 1878 (aged 59); Paris, France
- Burial: 24 June 1878; Royal Vault, St George's Chapel, Windsor Castle
- Spouse: Marie of Saxe-Altenburg (m. 1843)
- Issue: Ernest Augustus, Crown Prince of Hanover; Princess Frederica, Baroness von Pawel-Rammingen; Princess Marie
Names
- German: Georg Friedrich Alexander Karl Ernst August; English: George Frederick Alexander Charles Ernest Augustus
- House: Hanover
- Father: Ernest Augustus, King of Hanover
- Mother: Frederica of Mecklenburg-Strelitz
- Religion: Lutheran

Member of the House of Lords Lord Temporal
- Hereditary peerage 18 November 1851 – 12 June 1878
- Preceded by: The 1st Duke of Cumberland and Teviotdale
- Succeeded by: The 3rd Duke of Cumberland and Teviotdale

George V (Georg Friedrich Alexander Karl Ernst August; 27 May 1819 – 12 June 1878) was the last King of Hanover, reigning from 18 November 1851 to 20 September 1866. The only child of King Ernest Augustus and Queen Frederica, he succeeded his father in 1851. George's reign was ended by the Austro-Prussian War, after which Prussia annexed Hanover.

== Early life ==
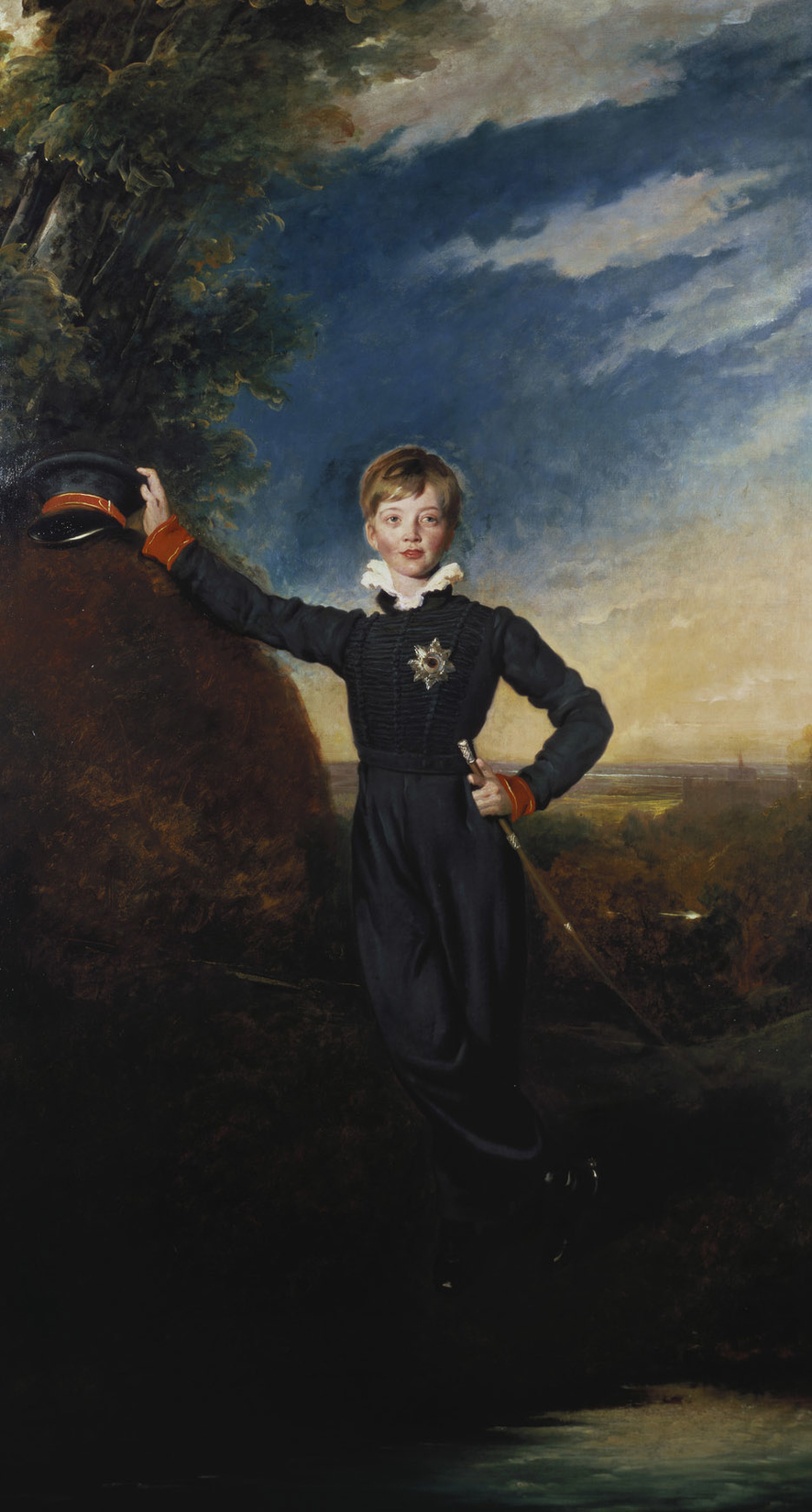
Portrait of George as a boy by Thomas Lawrence, 1828.

George was born on 27 May 1819 in Berlin, the only legitimate son of Prince Ernest Augustus, Duke of Cumberland and Teviotdale. Ernest Augustus was the fifth son of George III of the United Kingdom and his wife, Charlotte of Mecklenburg-Strelitz. Prince George's mother was Princess Frederica, niece of Queen Charlotte, the daughter of Charles II, Grand Duke of Mecklenburg-Strelitz and Frederica of Hesse-Darmstadt. George was seventh in the line of succession to the British throne at birth and later became the son of the heir presumptive.

Prince George was baptised on 8 July 1819 at a hotel in Berlin where his parents were staying, by the Rev. Henry Thomas Austen (brother of author Jane Austen). His godparents were the Prince Regent (represented by the Duke of Cumberland); Frederick William III of Prussia; Alexander I of Russia; Crown Prince Frederick William of Prussia; Prince William of Prussia; Prince Frederick of Prussia; Prince Henry of Prussia; Prince and Princess William of Prussia; Georg, Grand Duke of Mecklenburg-Strelitz; Duke Charles of Mecklenburg; the Dowager Empress of Russia; Wilhelmine of Prussia, Queen of the Netherlands; Princess Augusta Sophia of the United Kingdom; the Hereditary Princess of Hesse-Homburg; Princess Mary, Duchess of Gloucester and Edinburgh; Princess Sophia of the United Kingdom; Princess Alexandrine of Prussia; the Hereditary Princess of Hesse-Kassel; the Duchess of Anhalt-Dessau; Princess Ferdinand of Prussia; Princess Louisa of Prussia; and Princess Radziwiłł.

George spent his childhood in Berlin and in Great Britain. He lost the sight of one eye following a childhood illness in 1828, and in the other eye following an accident in 1833. His father had hoped that the young prince might marry his cousin, the future Queen Victoria, who was older by three days, thus keeping the British and Hanoverian thrones united. However, nothing came of the plan.

== Crown Prince ==
Upon the death of King William IV and the accession of Queen Victoria to the British throne, the 123-year personal union of the British and Hanoverian thrones ended because Hanover's semi-Salic law prevented a woman from ascending its throne. The Duke of Cumberland succeeded to the Hanoverian throne as Ernest Augustus, and Prince George became the Crown Prince of Hanover. As a legitimate descendant of George III in the male line, he remained a member of the British royal family and second in line to the British throne until the birth of Queen Victoria's first child, Victoria, Princess Royal, in 1840. Since he was totally blind, there were doubts as to whether the Crown Prince was qualified to succeed as king of Hanover, but his father decided that he should do so.

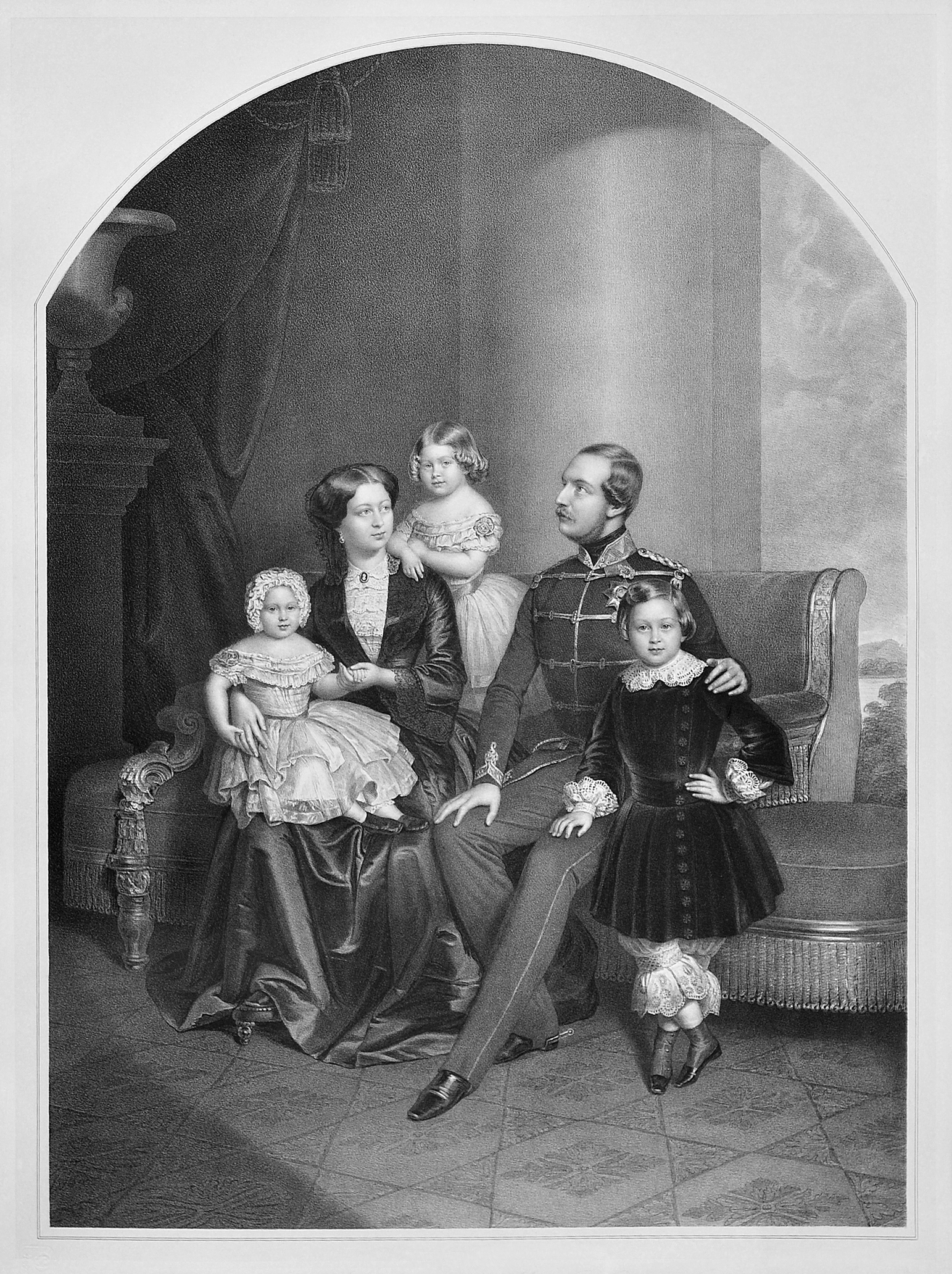
George V of Hanover, his wife Marie of Saxe-Altenburg and their children Ernest Augustus, Crown Prince of Hanover, Princess Frederica of Hanover, and Princess Marie of Hanover

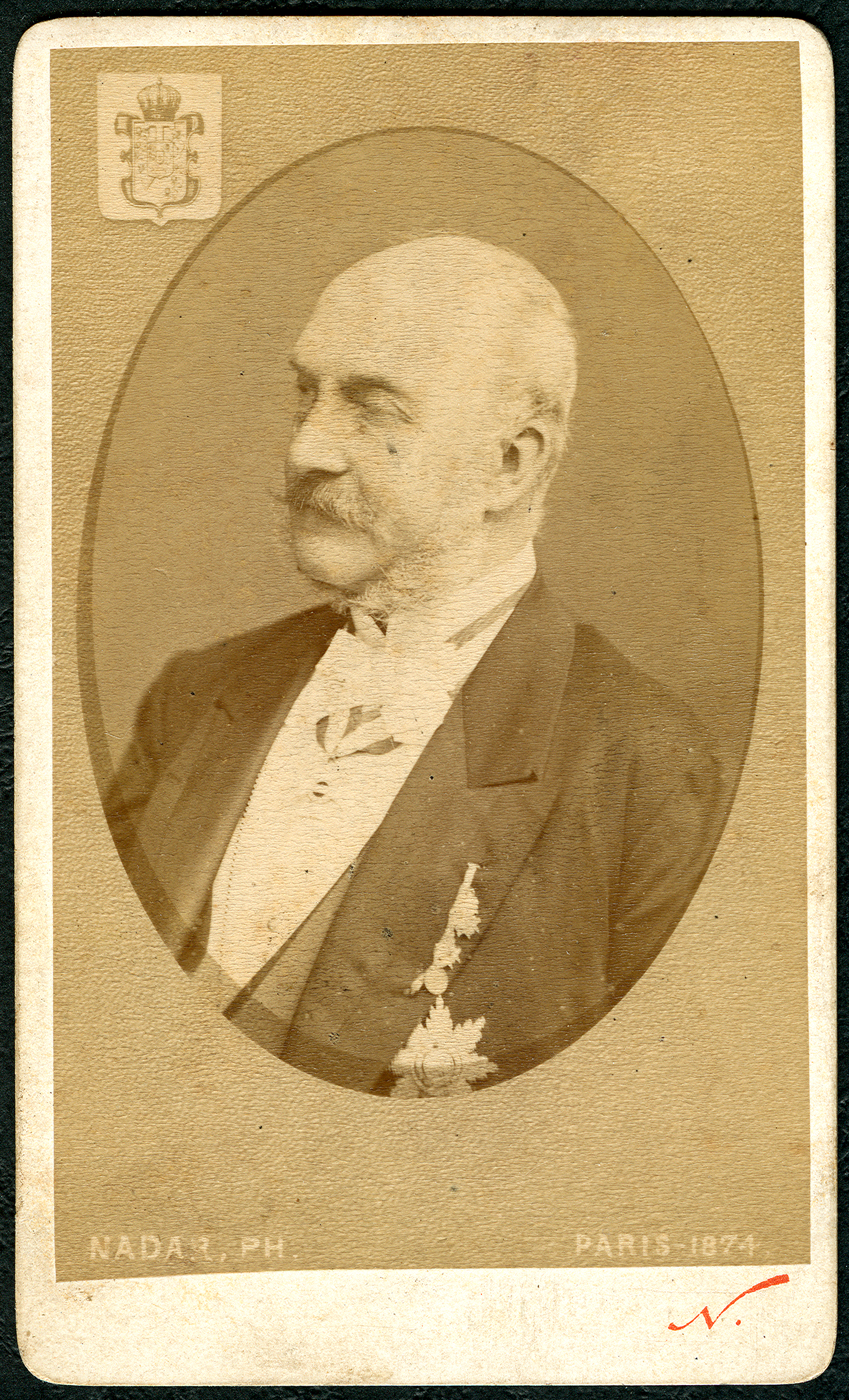
Carte de visite made by Nadar in Paris, 1874

== Marriage ==
George married, on 18 February 1843, at Hanover, Princess Marie of Saxe-Altenburg, the eldest daughter of Joseph, Duke of Saxe-Altenburg, by his wife, Duchess Amelia of Württemberg.

== King of Hanover ==
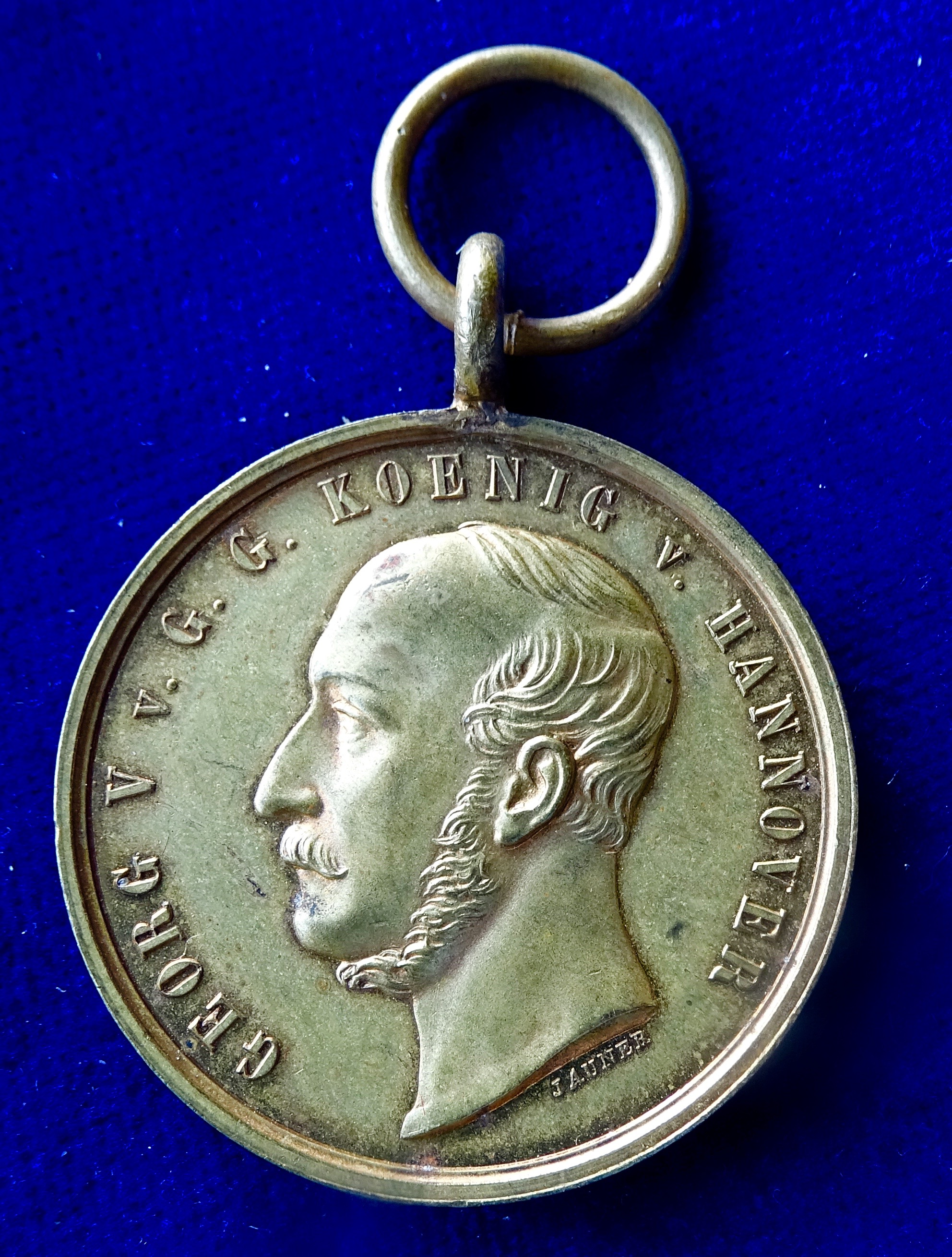
Battle of Langensalza (1866) Hanoverian Medal, awarded by George V to his troops fighting in that battle. Obverse

The Crown Prince succeeded his father as the King of Hanover and Duke of Brunswick-Lüneburg as well as Duke of Cumberland and Teviotdale, in the Peerage of Great Britain and Earl of Armagh, in the Peerage of Ireland, on 18 November 1851, assuming the style George V.

From his father and from his maternal uncle, Duke Charles of Mecklenburg, one of the most influential men at the Prussian court, George had learned to take a very high and autocratic view of royal authority. During his 15-year reign, he engaged in frequent disputes with the Hanoverian Landtag (parliament).

Unlike his father, the King had a deep aversion to Prussia, which bordered on the Kingdom of Hanover in the west and east. George was generally supportive of the Austrian Empire in the Diet of the German Confederation. He also refused Prussia permission to build the railway line from the Prussian garrison town of Minden to the Prussian naval port in Wilhelmshaven.

Against the decision of his parliament, he refused to agree to the Prussian demand for neutrality and thus a break with the German Confederation in the upcoming German War, but joined the other loyal central states. As the Austro-Prussian War started, the Prussian government sent a dispatch on 15 June 1866 demanding that Hanover enter into an alliance with them and Hanoverian troops submit to their authority or face war. Despite previously having concluded that Hanover could not win an armed confrontation with Prussia, George remained protective of his throne and refused the ultimatum. Contrary to the wishes of the parliament, Hanover joined the Austrian camp in the war. As a result, the 20,600-strong Hanoverian Army surrendered on 29 June 1866 following the Battle of Langensalza, although tactically successful but hopelessly outnumbered in soldiers. George V had joined his army headquarters in Göttingen. The Kingdom of Hanover was then occupied by Prussian troops. Austria lost the war and several of its Central German allies were annexed by Prussia, such as the Electorate of Hesse and the Duchy of Nassau. George firmly rejected an abdication in favour of his son Ernest Augustus, as suggested by Queen Marie in order to be able to possibly save the existence of the kingdom.

The Prussian government formally annexed Hanover on 20 September 1866, despite the King of Prussia, Wilhelm I, being a first cousin of King George V of Hanover; their mothers were sisters. The deposed King never renounced his rights to the defunct throne or acknowledged Prussia's actions. He went into exile in Austria. While the Austrian Emperor Franz Joseph I successfully campaigned for the continuation of the Kingdom of Saxony at the Prague peace negotiations, he did nothing to prevent the annexation of Hanover. The Prussian interest in the land bridge between the two parts of Prussia seemed to leave him little hope.

Queen Marie with their children stayed at Marienburg Castle for a year, but then followed her husband. They initially lived in Vienna, where George bought a house that is now the Czech Embassy, but in 1868 bought a summer villa in Gmunden, Austria, which they soon used as their main residence.

From exile he appealed in vain for the European great powers to intervene on behalf of Hanover. From 1866 to 1870, George V maintained the Guelphic Legion partially at his own expense, hoping that a Franco-Prussian war would lead to the reconquest of his kingdom. In Paris he had the magazine Situation published, which daily attacked the new order of things in Germany in the most violent terms and fueled France's hatred of a Germany that was becoming more and more Prussian. Much to his disappointment, Napoleon III lost the Franco-Prussian War in 1871.

All of this ultimately led to Prussia suspending financial compensation that had already been promised and confiscating his private assets. The Minister President of Prussia Otto von Bismarck had the sequestered assets, the so-called Guelph Fund, managed by a special Prussian commission in Hanover and used the proceeds "to combat Guelph activities".

While in exile, he was appointed an honorary full general in the British Army in 1876.

== Death ==
George V died at his residence in the Rue de Presbourg, Paris, on 12 June 1878. He had come there to seek financial and political support for a re-establishment of his legion. After a funeral service in the Lutheran Church at the Rue Chaucat, his body was removed to England and buried in St George's Chapel at Windsor Castle.

== Legacy ==
The King supported industrial development. In 1856 the "Georgs-Marien-Bergwerks- und Hüttenverein" was founded which was named after him and his wife. The company erected an iron and steel works which gave the city Georgsmarienhütte its name.

== Titles, styles, honours and arms ==
=== Titles and styles ===
- 27 May 1819 – 20 June 1837: His Royal Highness Prince George of Cumberland
- 20 June 1837 – 18 November 1851: His Royal Highness The Crown Prince of Hanover
- 18 November 1851 – 12 June 1878: His Majesty The King of Hanover

=== Honours ===
- Kingdom of Hanover:
  - Sovereign and Grand Cross of the Royal Guelphic Order, 1825
  - Sovereign and Knight of St. George, 1839
  - Founder and Sovereign of the Order of Ernst August, 15 December 1865
- United Kingdom: Knight of the Garter, 15 August 1835
- Ascanian duchies: Grand Cross of Albert the Bear, 16 June 1840
- Austrian Empire:
  - Grand Cross of St. Stephen, 1843
  - Commander of the Military Order of Maria Theresa, 1866
- Baden:
  - Knight of the House Order of Fidelity, 1855
  - Grand Cross of the Zähringer Lion, 1855
- Kingdom of Bavaria: Knight of St. Hubert, 1852
- Brunswick: Grand Cross of Henry the Lion
- Belgium: Grand Cordon of the Order of Leopold, 25 May 1853
- Denmark: Knight of the Elephant, 23 November 1851
- (Saxe-Coburg and Gotha) (Duchy of Saxe-Altenburg) (Saxe-Meiningen) Ernestine duchies: Grand Cross of the Saxe-Ernestine House Order, August 1839
- French Empire: Grand Cross of the Legion of Honour, 28 June 1860
- Mecklenburg: Grand Cross of the Wendish Crown, with Crown in Ore, 29 October 1865
- Oldenburg: Grand Cross of the Order of Duke Peter Friedrich Ludwig, with Golden Crown, 11 September 1841
- Kingdom of Prussia: Knight of the Black Eagle, 14 June 1838; with Collar, 1852
- Saxe-Weimar-Eisenach: Grand Cross of the White Falcon, 27 May 1857
- Kingdom of Saxony: Knight of the Rue Crown, 1852
- Spain: Knight of the Golden Fleece, 5 May 1865
- Sweden-Norway: Knight of the Seraphim, 9 September 1852
- Württemberg: Grand Cross of the Württemberg Crown, 1852

=== Arms ===
By grant dated 15 August 1835, George's arms in right of the United Kingdom were those of his father (being the arms of the United Kingdom, differenced by a label argent of three points, the centre point charged with a fleur-de-lys azure, and each of the other points charged with a cross gules), the whole differenced by a label gules bearing a horse courant argent. He removed the label after his father's death in 1851.

== Issue ==
| Name | Birth | Death | Notes |
|---|---|---|---|
| Ernest Augustus, Crown Prince of Hanover | 21 September 1845 | 14 November 1923 | Ernest Augustus William Adolphus George Frederick; born at Hanover, died at Gmunden, married Princess Thyra of Denmark; had issue |
| Princess Frederica of Hanover | 9 January 1848 | 16 October 1926 | born at Hanover, died at Biarritz; married Alfons, Baron von Pawel-Rammingen; had no surviving issue |
| Princess Marie of Hanover | 3 December 1849 | 4 June 1904 | Marie Ernestine Josephine Adolphine Henrietta Theresa Elizabeth Alexandrina; born at Hanover, died unmarried at Gmunden |

George V of Hanover House of Hanover Cadet branch of the House of Welf Born: 27 May 1819 Died: 12 June 1878
Regnal titles
| Preceded by Ernest Augustus | King of Hanover; 18 November 1851 – 20 September 1866 | Hanover annexed by Prussia |
Peerage of Great Britain
| Preceded by Ernest Augustus | Duke of Cumberland and Teviotdale; 18 November 1851 – 12 June 1878 | Succeeded by Ernest Augustus |
Titles in pretence
| Loss of title Kingdom dissolved | — TITULAR — King of Hanover; 20 September 1866 – 12 June 1878 | Succeeded by Ernest Augustus |
