= Ronald Ferguson (polo) =

British Army officer (1931–2003)

Ronald Ferguson OStJ
- Born: Ronald Ivor Ferguson; 10 October 1931; London, England
- Died: 16 March 2003 (aged 71); Basingstoke, Hampshire, England
- Spouses: Susan Wright (m. 1956; div. 1974) Susan Deptford (m. 1975)
- Children: 5, including Sarah
- Parents: Colonel Andrew Henry Ferguson (father); Marian Montagu Douglas Scott (mother)

Major Ronald Ivor Ferguson (10 October 1931 – 16 March 2003) was a British Army officer and polo manager, initially to the Duke of Edinburgh and later, for many years, to the then Charles, Prince of Wales. His daughter, Sarah Ferguson, is the former wife of Andrew Mountbatten-Windsor, formerly Prince Andrew, Duke of York. He was the maternal grandfather of Princesses Beatrice and Eugenie.

== Biography ==
=== Early life ===
Ronald Ivor Ferguson was the son of Colonel Andrew Henry Ferguson (1899–1966) and his wife Marian Montagu Douglas Scott (1908–1996), a first cousin of Lady Alice Montagu Douglas Scott, who became (after her wedding to Prince Henry, Duke of Gloucester) Princess Alice, Duchess of Gloucester, and an aunt-by-marriage of Queen Elizabeth II.

His maternal grandfather was Lieutenant-colonel Lord Herbert Montagu Douglas Scott, the fourth son of William Montagu Douglas Scott, 6th Duke of Buccleuch, a direct descendant of Charles II of England, and Lady Louisa Jane Hamilton.

His great-grandfather (through his paternal grandmother) was Henry Brand, 2nd Viscount Hampden.

Ferguson's elder brother, John Ferguson, died at 10 years of age from peritonitis.

He was born in London and grew up at Dummer Down Farm, his later home in adulthood, at Dummer, near Basingstoke in Hampshire. He attended Ludgrove School followed by Eton College and Sandhurst.

=== Career ===
He entered the Life Guards in February 1952, the regiment of which his father had previously been colonel. In 1954 Ferguson was promoted to lieutenant and captain in 1958. Ferguson retired in 1968 and was "granted the honorary rank of major". During his career he served with the regiment in Germany, Egypt, Aden, and Cyprus. In 1987, he was entered as an officer (brother) in the Venerable Order of Saint John.

=== Polo ===
After he retired, he devoted himself to polo. His interest in polo frequently brought him into contact with the Royal Family, and it was through this connection that his daughter, Sarah, met Prince Andrew.

In 1979, on the England II team alongside Alan Kent, Patrick Churchward and Charles, Prince of Wales, he won the Silver Jubilee Cup.

In 1988, while his daughter Sarah was married to Andrew, the News of the World printed a story about Ferguson's membership of the Wigmore Club, "a health club and massage parlour in London staffed by girls who, dressed in starched white 'medical' gowns, allegedly offered à la carte sexual services to members." He maintained that he had used the club "for massage only... and by that I mean a totally straight one" and as "a kind of cocoon where I could shut myself away for an hour and think". The controversy did not affect his marriage; however, it allegedly led him to leave his post as the Prince of Wales' polo manager and his position at the Guards Polo Club.

He was reinstated with the Guards Polo Club shortly before he died.

=== Personal life and death ===
Ferguson's first wife was Susan Mary Wright. They married in St Margaret's, Westminster, on 17 January 1956. They had two daughters; Jane Louisa Ferguson (born 1957) and Sarah Margaret Ferguson (born 1959) later the Duchess of York. Sarah married Prince Andrew in 1986 and divorced in 1996. The couple had two daughters, Princess Beatrice (born 1988) and Princess Eugenie (born 1990).

The couple divorced in 1974. During their marriage, the Fergusons were recognised society figures. The Major retired from his army career, and his family moved to Dummer Down Farm which he inherited upon his father's death. In 1975, Ferguson married for the second time, to Susan Rosemary Deptford (b. 1946). They had three children.

Ferguson's widow, Susan, remarried at Dummer in 2012 to Lieutenant-general Sir Richard Swinburn, who was made Commander, UK Field Army, in 1994. Prince Andrew, his ex-wife Sarah, and their two daughters Beatrice and Eugenie, attended Sir Richard and Lady Swinburn's wedding celebrations. Sir Richard died in October 2017.

His rare media appearances were to defend his daughter Sarah and raise awareness of prostate cancer. He had cancer during the last decade of his life. He was diagnosed with prostate cancer in 1996, and also had skin cancer. He suffered a heart attack in November 2002. In March 2003, at age 71, he died of a heart attack at the Hampshire Clinic, Basingstoke, Hampshire, England.

== Bibliography ==
- The Galloping Major: My Life in Singular Times (London: Macmillan, 1994. ISBN 978-0-333-61454-9)
