= Andrew Montagu Douglas Scott =

British Army officer

- Born: 13 July 1906
- Died: 24 January 1971 (aged 64)
- Spouse(s): Lady Victoria Doris Rachel Haig (m. 1929; div. 1951); Zalia Snagge (m. 1951)
- Relatives: Lord Herbert Montagu Douglas Scott (father); Marie Edwards (mother)
- Military career
- Allegiance: United Kingdom
- Branch: British Army
- Rank: Brigadier
- Unit: Irish Guards
- Commands: 1st Guards Brigade (1944–1945); 28th Brigade (1944)
- Conflicts: Second World War
- Awards: Distinguished Service Order; Officer of the Venerable Order of Saint John; Mentioned in Despatches

Brigadier Claud Andrew Montagu Douglas Scott, DSO (13 July 1906 – 24 January 1971) was the first child and only son born to Lieutenant Colonel Lord Herbert Andrew Montagu Douglas Scott and Marie Josephine Edwards. He was a grandson of William Henry Walter Montagu Douglas Scott, 6th Duke of Buccleuch & 8th Duke of Queensberry and Louisa Montagu Douglas Scott, Duchess of Buccleuch and Queensberry, and a paternal first cousin to Princess Alice, Duchess of Gloucester. He was a maternal first cousin once removed to Prince William of Gloucester and Prince Richard, Duke of Gloucester, a paternal great-uncle to Sarah Ferguson, and a maternal second great-uncle to Princesses Beatrice and Eugenie of York.

== Early life and family ==
As was the case with his father, Claud Andrew Montagu Douglas Scott was known most commonly by his middle name, Andrew. He was educated at Eton College.

On 10 August 1929, Montagu Douglas Scott married Lady Victoria Doris Rachel "Doria" Haig (1908–1993), daughter of Field Marshal Douglas Haig, 1st Earl Haig and Dorothy Maud Vivian. They had two children:

- Captain Douglas Andrew Montagu Douglas Scott (21 June 1930 – 21 June 2010)
- Henrietta Montagu Douglas Scott (9 December 1934 – 20 February 2008)

Doria and Montagu Douglas Scott divorced in 1951, and on 4 May 1951, he married Zalia Snagge (1915–1986), daughter of Sir Harold Edward Snagge and Inez Alfreda Lubbock, and ex-wife of Lieutenant Colonel Esmond Charles Baring. They had one child:

- Nicholas Herbert Montagu Douglas Scott (17 November 1954)

== Military career ==
Claud Andrew Montagu Douglas Scott was promoted to colonel while in the service of the Irish Guards. He was promoted to brigadier while in the service of the 1st Guards Brigade. Brigadier Scott fought in the Second World War, where he was mentioned in despatches.

== Death ==
Montagu Douglas Scott died on 24 January 1971, in his 65th year. He was predeceased by one grandson and survived by his first wife, Doria, his second wife, Zalia, his three children Andrew, Henrietta, and Nicholas, and four grandchildren.

== Honours and awards ==
- 1944: Distinguished Service Order
- Mentioned in Despatches
- Officerof the Venerable Order of Saint John
