= Thomas Elmhirst =

Senior commander in the Royal Air Force

Sir Thomas Elmhirst
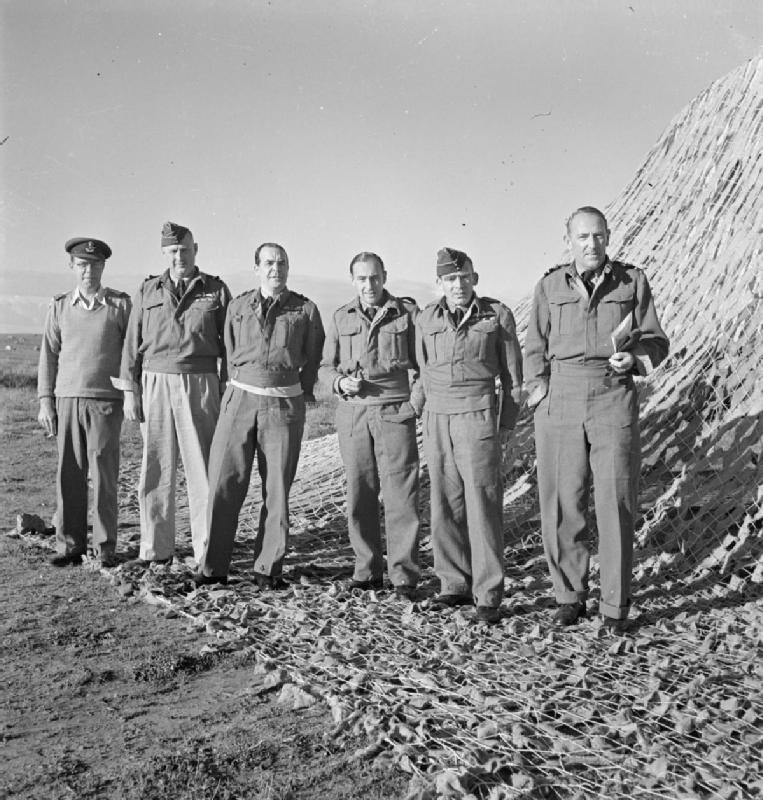
- Elmhirst (second from right) with other senior officers of the Desert Air Force
- Born: 15 December 1895; Yorkshire, England
- Died: 6 November 1982 (aged 86); Dummer, Hampshire, England
- Spouse(s): Katherine Gordon Black (m. 1930–65; her death); Marian Ferguson (m. 1968–82; his death)
- Relatives: Leonard Knight Elmhirst (brother)
- Military career
- Allegiance: United Kingdom
- Branch: Royal Navy (1908–18); Royal Air Force (1918–1950)
- Service years: 1908–1950
- Rank: Air Marshal
- Commands: Royal Indian Air Force (1947–50); AHQ Egypt (1942–43); No. 202 Group (1941–42); RAF Abingdon (1935–37, 1939–40); RAF Leconfield (1939); No. 14 Squadron (1934–35)
- Conflicts: First World War; Second World War
- Awards: Knight Commander of the Order of the British Empire; Companion of the Order of the Bath; Air Force Cross; Knight of the Order of St John; Mentioned in Despatches (4); Grand Officer of the Order of the Crown (Belgium); Croix de Guerre (Belgium); Commander of the Legion of Merit (United States); Commander of the Legion of Honour (France); Croix de Guerre (France)

Air Marshal Sir Thomas Walker Elmhirst, KBE, CB, AFC, DL (15 December 1895 – 6 November 1982) was a senior commander in the Royal Air Force in the first half of the 20th century and the first commander-in-chief of the Royal Indian Air Force upon Indian independence in August 1947, in which post he organised the funeral of Mahatma Gandhi following his assassination in 1948. He later became the Lieutenant-Governor and Commander-in-Chief of Guernsey from 1953 to 1958.

== Family ==
Thomas Elmhirst was born on 15 December 1895 to Reverend William Heaton Elmhirst (b. 1856) and Mary Elmhirst (née Knight; b. 1863), a landed gentry family in Yorkshire, where the family seat is Houndhill. He was the fourth of eight boys and had one younger sister. The children were:

- Captain William Elmhirst (1892–1916), killed on 13 November 1916 while serving with the 8th Battalion East Yorkshire Regiment during the Battle of the Somme
- Leonard Knight Elmhirst (1893–1974), a noted philanthropist and educational reformer who married Dorothy Payne Whitney
- Second Lieutenant Ernest Christopher "Christie" Elmhirst (1895–1915), killed on 7 August 1915 while serving with the 8th Battalion Duke of Wellington's (West Riding Regiment) during the Gallipoli campaign
- Thomas Elmhirst (1895–1982)
- James Victor Elmhirst (1898–1958)
- Richard Elmhirst (1900–1978)
- Alfred O. Elmhirst (1901–1995) of Houndhill
- Irene Rachel Elmhirst (b. 1902)

== Military career ==
Elmhirst studied at the Royal Naval Colleges at Osborne, Isle of Wight in 1908, and at Dartmouth in Devon.

=== First World War ===
In April 1912, Elmhirst joined his first ship, HMS Cornwall. He was commissioned as a midshipman in the Royal Navy in 1913 and was posted to HMS Indomitable in the 1st Battlecruiser Squadron under David Beatty. When war came he served on HMS Indomitable as the ship took part in the initial bombardment of the Turkish Dardanelles forts and the Battle of Dogger Bank, where he commanded 'X Gun Turret', the last one to fire at the German ship SMS Blücher before it sank. In 1915 he was selected to be in the first draft of the Royal Naval Air Service where he served until the end of the First World War. He celebrated the armistice by flying an airship (SSZ73) under the Menai Bridge with his friend Gordon Campbell as his passenger. By 1917, he was promoted to flight lieutenant and by March 1918 to major, commanding the Naval Airship Patrol Station on Anglesey in Wales. He then became part of the newly formed Royal Air Force in 1919.

Between the wars Elmhirst trialled the first gyroscopic compass for aircraft in the RAF and became Air Attaché to Turkey in the run up to the Second World War. In January 1940 returned to the Air Ministry as Deputy Director of Intelligence.

=== Second World War ===
During the Second World War Elmhirst ran the operations room at RAF Uxbridge during the Battle of Britain. He then commanded the Egypt Command Group under Air Marshal Tedder before becoming second-in-command of the Desert Air Force. He continued in this role through the battle of Alamein until after the Allied invasion of Sicily. He was then second-in-command of British Air Forces in North West Europe until the end of the war, serving in D-Day, Normandy, the Ardennes and the advance across the France and Germany. Finally he became Assistant Chief of the Air Staff (Intelligence) in August 1945.

=== Post war ===
In July 1947, as India approached independence, Prime Minister Jawaharlal Nehru invited Air Marshal Elmhirst to become the first Commander-in-Chief of the Royal Indian Air Force. Elmhirst accepted the position on the condition that the RIAF be established as an independent service under the Ministry of Defence, and that he be permitted to select a team of senior RAF officers to assist in the transition. Nehru agreed to these terms, and Elmhirst formally assumed command on 15 August 1947.

In 1953, Elmhirst ran Operation Totem, the first British nuclear bomb land tests in Emu Field, Australia. Later in 1953 he became the Lieutenant-Governor of Guernsey, welcoming Queen Elizabeth II on her inaugural tour of the island as the new monarch. He held the post for five years, retiring in 1958.

== Personal life ==
Elmhirst married firstly Katherine Gordon Black, daughter of William Black, on 16 December 1930, and had two children before Katherine's death in 1965:

- Roger Elmhirst (1935–1999)
- Caroline Jane Elmhirst (b. 1932), who married Michael Frazer Mackie

On 30 October 1968, he married Marian Ferguson (née Montagu Douglas Scott), widow of Colonel Andrew Henry Ferguson. Marian was the daughter of Lord Herbert Montagu Douglas Scott and Marie Josephine Edwards, and the granddaughter of The 6th Duke of Buccleuch and Lady Louisa Hamilton. From Marian's first marriage, she was the paternal grandmother of Sarah Ferguson, and maternal great-grandmother of Princess Beatrice of York and Princess Eugenie of York. Together they lived at Dummer Down House, at Dummer in Basingstoke, Hants, her dower estate from her first marriage.

Thomas Elmhirst died at Dummer, Hampshire, on 6 November 1982, in his 87th year. He was survived by his second wife, and his children and grandchildren from his first marriage.

Military offices
Preceded by Frank Inglis	Assistant Chief of the Air Staff (Intelligence); 1945–1947	Succeeded by Lawrence Pendred
Preceded by Sir Hugh Walmsley; As AOC in C, RAF India	Air Officer Commander-in-Chief, Air Forces in India; 1947–1948	Post upgraded
New title Indian Air Force became an independent service	Commander in Chief, Royal Indian Air Force; 1948–1950	Succeeded by Himself; Redesignated as Commander-in-Chief, Indian Air Force in January 1950, after India became a republic
New title Redesignated from Commander-in-Chief, Royal Indian Air Force	Commander in Chief, Indian Air Force; January–February 1950	Succeeded by Sir Ronald Ivelaw-Chapman
Government offices
Preceded by Sir Philip Neame	Lieutenant Governor of Guernsey; 1953–1958	Succeeded by Sir Geoffrey Robson
