= Dummer (surname) =

Dummer is a surname of Old English origin. It means those from Dummer, Hampshire.

== Notables with this name include ==
- Edmund Dummer, several people
- Elias Dummer (born 1983), Canadian musician
- Ethel Sturges Dummer (1866–1954), American writer
- Geoffrey Dummer (1909–2002), British electronics author and consultant
- George Dummer (1782-1853), American businessman
- Jeremiah Dummer (silversmith) (1643–1718), American silversmith
- Jeremiah Dummer (1681–1739), important colonial figure in New England who helped establish Yale College
- Phineas C. Dummer (1787–1875), sixth mayor of Jersey City, New Jersey, United States
- Richard Dummer (1589–1679), early settler in New England
- Richard Arnold Dümmer (1887–1922), South African botanist
- Shubael Dummer (1636–1692), early settler in New England murdered in Candlemas Massacre at York, Maine in 1692
- Thomas Lee Dummer (1712–1765), English Member of Parliament for Southampton (1737–1741) and Newport (Isle of Wight) (1747–1765)
- Thomas Dummer (1739–1781), English Member of Parliament for Newport (Isle of Wight) (1765–1768), Yarmouth (1769–1774), Downton (1774), Wendover (1775–1780) and Lymington (1780–1781); son of Thomas Lee Dummer
- William Dummer, several people

== See also ==
- Dummer family tree showing the relationships between many of the above
