= Marian Montagu Douglas Scott =

British noble (1908-1996)

Lady Elmhirst
- Born: Marian Louisa Montagu Douglas Scott; 16 June 1908; London, England
- Died: 11 December 1996 (aged 88); Dummer, Hampshire, England
- Spouses: Andrew Ferguson (m. 1927; died 1966) Sir Thomas Elmhirst (m. 1968; died 1982)
- Children: John Ferguson; Ronald Ferguson
- Parent(s): Lord Herbert Montagu Douglas Scott; Marie Edwards
- Relatives: Sarah Ferguson (granddaughter); Princess Beatrice (great-granddaughter); Princess Eugenie (great-granddaughter)

Marian Louisa, Lady Elmhirst (previously Ferguson; née Montagu Douglas Scott; 16 June 1908 – 11 December 1996) was the first daughter born to Lord Herbert Montagu Douglas Scott and Marie Edwards. She was the paternal grandmother of Sarah Ferguson, and the maternal great-grandmother of Princesses Beatrice and Eugenie of York.

Elmhirst was also a first cousin of Lady Alice Montagu Douglas Scott, who became the Duchess of Gloucester after her wedding to Prince Henry, and an aunt-by-marriage of Queen Elizabeth II. The Countess Spencer, Cynthia, paternal grandmother of Diana, Princess of Wales, was her 2nd cousin.

== Early life ==
Marian Montagu Douglas Scott was born on Tuesday 16 June 1908, the second child and first daughter for Lord Herbert Montagu Douglas Scott, son of William Montagu Douglas Scott, 6th Duke of Buccleuch and Lady Louisa Hamilton, and Marie Josephine Edwards, daughter of James Andrew Edwards and Kate Marion Agnes MacNamara.

== Marriage and family ==
On 1 November 1927, at the age of 19, Marian married Colonel Andrew Ferguson (10 October 1899 – 4 August 1966), in London. The couple had two sons:

- John Ferguson (21 January 1929 – 1939)
- Ronald Ferguson (10 October 1931 – 16 March 2003)

Her first son, John, was 10 years old when he died from peritonitis. In 2019, Marian's granddaughter, Sarah Ferguson, revealed in a speech that her uncle had died as a result of an allergic reaction after he ate a crab sandwich.

Her second son, Ronald, was the father of Sarah, Duchess of York, and the maternal grandfather of Princesses Beatrice and Eugenie of York. He died on 16 March 2003 from a heart attack after a lengthy battle with skin and prostate cancers.

On 30 October 1968, a little more than two years after the death of her husband, Andrew Ferguson (4 August 1966), Marian married Sir Thomas Elmhirst, widower of the late Katherine Black, thus becoming Lady Elmhirst. He died on 6 November 1982.

== Death ==
Lady Elmhirst died on 11 December 1996 at Dummer, Hampshire, at the age of 88. She was predeceased by two husbands, Andrew Ferguson (4 August 1966) and Sir Thomas Elmhirst (6 November 1982), and her firstborn son John Ferguson (d. 1939). At the time of her death, she was survived by her son, Major Ronald Ferguson, five grandchildren, and five great-grandchildren.
