= Lord Henry Scott =

Scottish cricketer and British Army officer (1868-1945)

Personal information
- Full name: Lord Henry Francis Montagu-Douglas Scott
- Born: 15 January 1868; Bowhill, Selkirkshire, Scotland
- Died: 19 April 1945 (aged 77); Melrose, Roxburghshire, Scotland
- Batting: Unknown
- Relatives: Lord George Scott (brother); Earl of Dalkeith (brother); Charles Montagu-Scott (grandfather); David Brand (nephew); Lord George Hamilton (uncle)

Career statistics
Competition	First-class
Matches	1
Runs scored	25
Batting average	25.00
100s/50s	–/–
Top score	23*
Catches/stumpings	2/–
- Source: Cricinfo, 28 August 2019

Lord Henry Francis Montagu-Douglas Scott (15 January 1868 – 19 April 1945) was a Scottish first-class cricketer and British Army officer.

The fourth son of William Montagu Douglas Scott, 6th Duke of Buccleuch and his wife, Louisa Montagu Douglas Scott, he was born in January 1868 at Bowhill, Selkirkshire. He was educated at Eton College, before going up to Christ Church, Oxford. Scott made a single appearance in first-class cricket for H. Philipson's XI against Oxford University at Oxford in 1891. Batting twice in the match, he ended the H. Philipson's XI first-innings unbeaten on 23, while in their second-innings he was dismissed for 2 runs by George Berkeley.

After graduating from Oxford, he was commissioned as a second lieutenant into the part-time 3rd (Edinburgh Light Infantry Militia) Battalion, Royal Scots, a regiment that had been raised by the 3rd Duke of Buccleuch and also commanded by the 5th Duke. He was promoted to lieutenant in May 1888, and to captain in October 1890. He served with the battalion in the Second Boer War, during which he was promoted to the rank of major. He was granted the honorary rank of lieutenant colonel in June 1905. and became commanding officer of the battalion in November of the same year. After retirement from the command in 1912 he was appointed Honorary Colonel of the 3rd (Reserve) Battalion, Royal Scots, as the battalion had become in the Special Reserve.

Scott saw service again in the First World War, during which he was mentioned in dispatches five times. Upon the outbreak of the war, he was appointed to command the 1st Public Schools Battalion, Royal Fusiliers, in September 1914. After his battalion was disbanded he transferred to a service battalion of the Bedfordshire Regiment. Towards the end of the war, he was transferred to the Labour Corps. Scott relinquished his commission following the conclusion of the war and was granted the full rank of colonel.

Scott founded the Royal Scots Club in 1921 as a memorial to the fallen soldiers of the Royal Scots, making membership of the club open to all ranks. He had been appointed to the ceremonial rank of brigadier in the Royal Company of Archers in June 1915. In later life he served as the deputy-governor of the Bank of Scotland and as a justice of the peace for Dumfries-shire, Roxburghshire and Berwickshire. He died at Melrose in April 1945, unmarried.
