= Barnwell Manor =

Country estate in Northamptonshire, England

Coordinates: 52.454339°N 0.456367°W

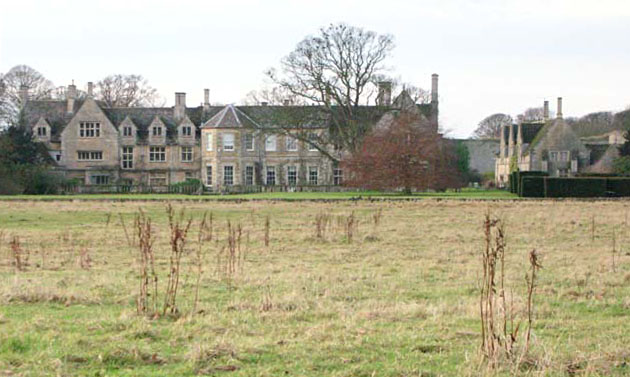
Barnwell Manor

Barnwell Manor is a Grade II listed country estate near the village of Barnwell, about 2.5 miles (4.0 km) south of Oundle, in Northamptonshire, England. The historic former home of the Duke and Duchess of Gloucester, and subsequently the home of Windsor House Antiques, in September 2022, Prince Richard, Duke of Gloucester, put the manor up for sale for £4.75 million and it was sold in April 2024.

== History ==
The estate was granted to the Montagu family in 1540 by King Henry VIII, and they kept it until 1913, when it was sold by the 6th Duke of Buccleuch. In the interim period (1913–1938), Prince Philip's future Private Secretary Sir Brian McGrath (1925–2016) grew up at the manor until his parents bought their own house. The house may have been rented to a series of tenants.

In 1938 Prince Henry, Duke of Gloucester, the third son of King George V, bought the house and estate. The purchase price for the buildings and four tenanted farms was £37,500; in her memoirs, Princess Alice describes this amount as "the greater part of the money left to Prince Henry by the King." However, records of financial negotiations resulting from the Abdication of Edward VIII state that Prince Henry received a legacy of £750,000 from his father's private fortune.

The Duke's wife Alice was the daughter of the 7th Duke of Buccleuch, and had a fondness for the house which her grandfather had sold.

Following Prince Henry's appointment as Governor-General of Australia in 1945, the tenanted parts of the Barnwell Estate were sold for £47,500. Upon their return to the United Kingdom the surrounding farms were gradually repurchased during the 1940s, 50s and 60s, until the estate once again comprised its original size of 5,000 acres.

It was announced in January 1995 that the Gloucesters would vacate the house for financial reasons, and so that Princess Alice could move to Kensington Palace to be with her son, Prince Richard, Duke of Gloucester. The estate was then occupied by Windsor House Antiques (a privately-owned antiques business), prior to its eventual sale in 2024 to anonymous new private owners.

In 2013 the High Court disallowed an application by West Coast Energy to build a wind farm close to the manor's lodge. An appeal was subsequently dismissed. The appeal gained increased media attention because Justine Thornton, wife of the Labour leader Ed Miliband, was representing the appellant. The Duke of Gloucester had supported the proposal.

== Architecture and grounds ==
The house has four reception rooms, seven principal bedrooms, and six bathrooms. It is a 40-room 16,731 sq ft (1,554.4 m^{2}) Grade II eighteenth-century manor house, with origins dating to 1586. The estate now comprises 2,500 acres (10 km^{2}) farmed by the present Duke of Gloucester, and the ruined Barnwell Castle, built c.1266 by Berenger le Moyne, who sold it to Ramsey Abbey in 1276. The abbey held the castle until 1536, when it passed to the king. The Elizabethan manor house became the principal residence, and the living quarters and all internal buildings of the castle were demolished in 1704.

The house is listed Grade II on the National Heritage List for England.
