= Dumler =

Dumler is a surname. Notable people with the surname include:

- Carmen Lozano Dumler (1921–2015), Puerto Rican soldier
- Cornelia Dumler (born 1982), German volleyball player
- Doug Dumler (born 1950), American football player

== See also ==
- Dummer (surname)
