= Louisa Jane Hamilton =

Louisa Jane Hamilton may refer to:

- Louisa Jane Russell, Louisa Jane (Russell) Hamilton, 1st Duchess of Abercorn
- Louisa Montagu-Douglas-Scott, Duchess of Buccleuch and Queensberry, née Louisa Hamilton, 6th Duchess of Buccleuch & 8th Duchess of Queensberry
