= Walter Henry Montagu Douglas Scott, Earl of Dalkeith =

Scottish cricketer and barrister

Personal information
- Full name: Walter Henry Montagu Douglas Scott
- Born: 17 January 1861; Westminster, London, England
- Died: 18 September 1886 (aged 25); Loch Arkaig, Inverness-shire, Scotland
- Batting: Right-handed
- Relatives: See Duke of Buccleuch

Domestic team information
- Years: Team
- 1881–1885: Marylebone Cricket Club

Career statistics
Competition	First-class
Matches	3
Runs scored	9
Batting average	2.25
100s/50s	–/–
Top score	7
Catches/stumpings	–/–
- Source: Cricinfo, 24 April 2021

Walter Henry Montagu Douglas Scott, Earl of Dalkeith (17 January 1861 – 18 September 1886), styled Lord Eskdaill until 1884, was a Scottish nobleman and first-class cricketer.

== Biography ==
The son of the nobleman and politician William Montagu Douglas Scott and his wife, Louisa Montagu Douglas Scott, he was born at Westminster in January 1861. He was educated at Eton College, before going up to Christ Church, Oxford. He played first-class cricket for the Marylebone Cricket Club on three occasions, playing twice against Oxford University in 1881 and 1882 at Oxford and once against Yorkshire at Lord's in 1885. He had little success in these matches, scoring 9 runs with a high score of 7. His father became the 6th Duke of Buccleuch in 1884, at which point he succeeded his father as Earl of Dalkeith. He unsuccessfully contested the Dumfriesshire seat for the Conservative Party in the 1885 general election, losing to incumbent Sir Robert Jardine by 1,291 votes.

== Death ==
Scott died in a hunting accident on 18 September 1886 at the age of 25. He was deer stalking along the shores of Loch Arkaig at the estate of his aunt Lady Margaret Cameron. While pursuing a stag downhill which he had shot in the Achnacarry Forest, he slipped and slid down the hill while still holding his rifle. Hitting a boulder, the rifle discharged and shot him in the left shoulder. Despite the efforts of the remainder of the hunting party to treat the wound, he bled to death a short while later. His body was removed from the forest the following morning.

Scott was survived by both his distraught parents. He was succeeded as the Earl of Dalkeith by his younger brother, John Montagu Douglas Scott.
