= Dummer, Hampshire =

Village and parish in Hampshire, England

Coordinates: 51°12′37″N 1°09′40″W

Dummer
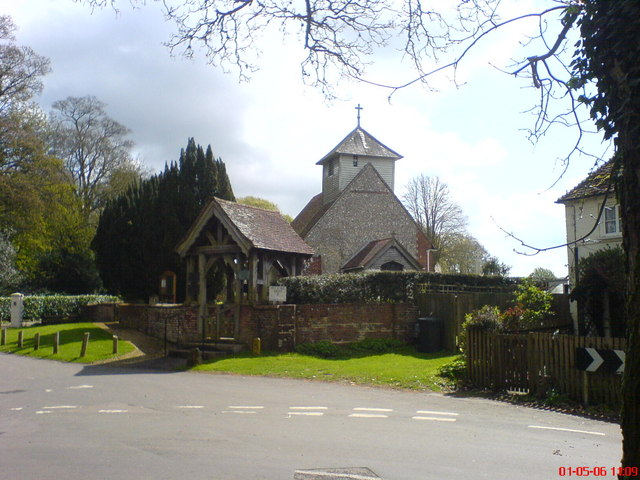
- All Saints' Church, Dummer

- Location within Hampshire
- Population: 466 (2011 Census including Popham)
- OS grid reference: SU583458
- Civil parish: Dummer
- District: Basingstoke and Deane
- Shire county: Hampshire
- Region: South East
- Country: England
- Sovereign state: United Kingdom
- Post town: BASINGSTOKE
- Postcode district: RG25
- Dialling code: 01256
- Police: Hampshire and Isle of Wight
- Fire: Hampshire and Isle of Wight
- Ambulance: South Central
- UK Parliament: North West Hampshire

Dummer is a parish and village in Hampshire, England. It is 6 miles (9.7 km) south-west of Basingstoke and near Junction 7 on the M3 motorway.

In the 2001 census, it had a population of 643, with 127 dwellings, reducing to a population of 466 in 201 households at the 2011 Census.

== History ==
The name of the village is derived from Dun (meaning hill) and Mer (lake or pond). The English surname 'Dummer' is thought to originate from here, as the Dummer family were lords of the manor between the 12th and 16th centuries.

All Saints Church is in the centre of the village. The church is part of the Church of England benefice of Farleigh, Candover and Wield, served by the same Rector.

A public house, The Queen Inn, is north of the church on Down Street towards the M3.

Also towards the M3 is the Dummer Golf Club, the course lying to the northeast of the village.

On the other side of the M3 north of the A30 is the Dummer Garden Centre, and a public house, The Sun Inn. A short distance south-west down the A30 is another public house and hotel, The Wheatsheaf.

To the south-west of Dummer village by about 3/4 mile (1.2 km) is Dummer Down Farm. This is the site of the Dummer Cricket Centre which was founded by Major Ronald Ferguson, father of Sarah Ferguson, former wife of Andrew Mountbatten-Windsor. The current owner, Andrew Ferguson, was a local councillor on Dummer Parish Council.

== Governance ==
The village is part of the civil parish of Dummer, which is part of the Oakley and North Waltham ward of Basingstoke and Deane borough council. The borough council is a non-metropolitan district of Hampshire County Council.

== Location ==
- Position: grid reference SU583458
- Nearby towns and cities: Alton, Andover, Basingstoke, Newbury, Winchester
- Nearby villages: Axford, Cliddesden, Farleigh Wallop, Hook, Kingsclere, Micheldever Station, North Waltham, Oakley, Old Basing, Overton, Popham, Steventon, Whitchurch.

== Notable people ==
- The Dummer family
- Sarah Ferguson
- Air Marshal Sir Thomas Elmhirst KBE CB AFC DL RAF, first Commander-in-chief of the Indian Air Force
- Tara Palmer-Tomkinson, aristocrat and socialite
- Ronald Ferguson, father of Sarah Ferguson
- Susan Barrantes, mother of Sarah Ferguson
- Charles Palmer-Tomkinson, aristocrat and socialite
- Marian Montagu Douglas Scott, paternal grandmother of Sarah Ferguson
- Charles Rycroft, psychologist
