= Christabel (given name) =

Christabel or Christabelle is a feminine given name derived from the elements "Christa" which means "follower of Christ/Christian", and "Belle" which means "beautiful". It may refer to:

== People with the given name ==
=== Pseudonym ===
- Christine Elizabeth Abrahamsen (1916–1995), American science fiction and gothic novelist
- Mary Downing (c. 1815–1881), Irish poet

=== Given name ===
- Christabel Baxendale (1886–1953), English violinist and composer
- Christabel Bielenberg (1909–2003), Anglo-Irish-German non-fiction writer
- Christabel Chamarette (born 1948), Greens Western Australia Senator for Western Australia
- Christabel Cockerell (1860–1903), British artist, wife of Sir George Frampton
- Christabel Rose Coleridge (1843–1921), English novelist
- Christabel Marshall (1871–1960), British campaigner for women's suffrage, a playwright and author
- Christabel Pankhurst (1880–1958), British suffragette
- Christabel Elizabeth Robinson MBE (1898–1988), New Zealand teacher, vocational guidance and community worker
- Princess Alice, Duchess of Gloucester (1901-2004), born Lady Alice Christabel Montagu Douglas Scott
- Princess Alexandra of Kent, born Princess Alexandra Helen Elizabeth Olga Christabel of Kent
- Christabelle Howie (born 1969), Indian beauty pageant titleholder
- Christabelle Silje Isabelle Birgitta Sandoo (born 1981), singer and musician, collaborator of Hans-Peter Lindstrøm, e.g. on Real Life Is No Cool
- Christabelle Borg (born 1992), Maltese singer
