= Barnwell Castle =

Castle in Northamptonshire, England

Coordinates: 52.45563°N 0.46062°W

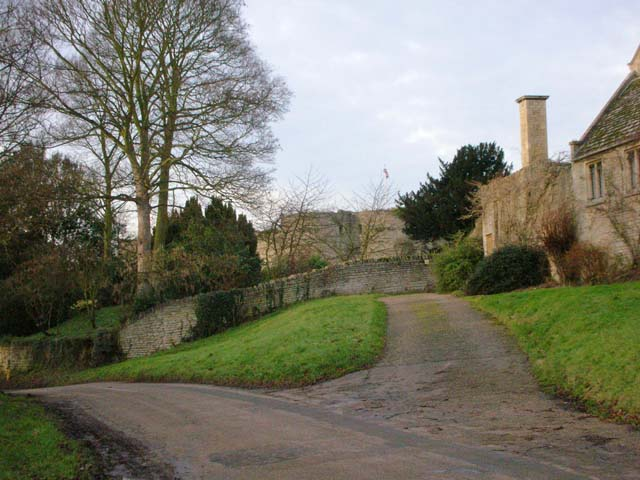
The castle can be seen in the middle of the photograph

Barnwell Castle is a ruined castle, south of the town of Oundle, and north of the village of Barnwell, Northamptonshire (grid reference TL047853). It has been designated by English Heritage as a Grade I listed building, and is a Scheduled Ancient Monument. It is under private ownership.

A motte and bailey castle was erected in 1132. The stone castle was built during the reign of King Henry III by the family of Berengar Le Moyne at the time of the Second Barons' War (1264–67). In the English Civil War it was used by its owner, Sir Edward Montagu, as an arsenal for the Royal cause. After the civil war the Montagu family built a substantial manor house, Barnwell Manor, near the castle.

Substantial parts of the castle remain. It is quadrilateral in shape with cylinder towers on the northeast, northwest and southwest corners. On the southeast corner is a twin-towered gatehouse. The walls are up to 30 feet (9 m) high and over 12 feet (4 m) thick.

== See also ==
- Castles in Great Britain and Ireland
- List of castles in England
