= Lord Herbert Scott =

British soldier and nobleman

Lieutenant Colonel Lord Herbert Montagu Douglas Scott CMG, DSO, DL
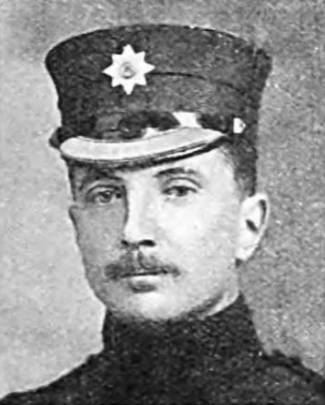

Personal details
- Born: 30 November 1872 Montagu House, London, England
- Died: 17 June 1944 (aged 71) Martyr Worthy, Hampshire, England
- Spouse: Marie Josephine Agnes Edwards (m. 1905)
- Children: Andrew Montagu Douglas Scott; Marian, Lady Elmhirst; Patricia Scrymgeour-Wedderburn, Countess of Dundee
- Parent(s): William Montagu Douglas Scott, 6th Duke of Buccleuch; Lady Louisa Hamilton

Military service
- Allegiance: United Kingdom
- Branch/service: British Army
- Rank: Lieutenant Colonel
- Commands: 1st/23rd London Regiment
- Battles/wars: Second Boer War; First World War
- Awards: Companion of the Order of St Michael and St George; Distinguished Service Order; Knight of Justice of the Order of St. John of Jerusalem; Mentioned in Despatches; Officer of the Legion of Honour (France)

Lieutenant Colonel Lord Herbert Andrew Montagu Douglas Scott, CMG, DSO, DL (30 November 1872 – 17 June 1944) was the fifth child born to William Henry Walter Montagu Douglas Scott, 6th Duke of Buccleuch & 8th Duke of Queensberry and Louisa Montagu Douglas Scott, Duchess of Buccleuch and Queensberry.

Montagu Douglas Scott was the great-grandfather of Sarah Ferguson, and the maternal great-great-grandfather of Princess Beatrice and Princess Eugenie of York. He was also the paternal uncle of Princess Alice, Duchess of Gloucester, and thereby the maternal great-uncle of Prince William of Gloucester and Prince Richard, Duke of Gloucester.

== Early life, marriage and family ==
Herbert Andrew Montagu Douglas Scott was born at Montagu House in Whitehall, London, on 30 November 1872. He was the fifth child born in a family of six boys and two girls.

On 26 April 1905, he married Marie Josephine Agnes Edwards, daughter of James Andrew Edwards and Kate Marion Agnes MacNamara, at St Peter's Church, Eaton Square, London. They had three children:

- Brigadier Andrew Montagu Douglas Scott (13 July 1906 – 24 January 1971)
- Marian Montagu Douglas Scott (16 June 1908 – 11 December 1996), grandmother of Sarah Ferguson (former daughter-in-law of Queen Elizabeth II)
- Patricia Katherine Montagu Douglas Scott (9 October 1910 – 3 December 2012), Countess of Dundee as wife of Henry Scrymgeour-Wedderburn, 11th Earl of Dundee

== Military career ==
Montagu Douglas Scott was commissioned into the part-time 3rd (Edinburgh Light Infantry Militia) Battalion, Royal Scots, a regiment that had been raised by the 3rd Duke of Buccleuch and also commanded by the 5th Duke. He was promoted to captain on 24 February 1894.

In December 1899 Montagu Douglas Scott was appointed for active service as a staff officer and extra aide-de-camp to Lord Roberts, commander-in-chief of the forces in South Africa during the early part of the Second Boer War. While stationed in South Africa, he was transferred to the regular army and appointed a second lieutenant in the newly created Irish Guards on 15 August 1900. Promoted to lieutenant on 6 October 1900, he served in the Guards Mounted Infantry in most of 1901, and was promoted to captain on 22 January 1902. For his war effort he was mentioned in despatches, awarded the Distinguished Service Order, and received the Queen's South Africa Medal with six clasps and the King's South Africa Medal with two clasps. Following the end of hostilities in June 1902 he returned to England, leaving Cape Town on the SS Norman, which arrived in Southampton in early September that year.

In early 1903, Montagu Douglas Scott was selected by General Sir Charles Clarke as his aide-de-camp as he took up the post of Governor of Malta. He was promoted in 1910 to lieutenant colonel in the 23rd (County of London) Battalion, London Regiment.

Lieutenant Colonel Montagu Douglas Scott fought in the First World War and commanded the 1/23rd London Regiment in France. He was promoted to brevet lieutenant colonel in June 1918.

== Civilian career ==
After his retirement from military service, he accepted a position as Chairman of Rolls-Royce.

== Death ==
Lieutenant Colonel Lord Herbert Andrew Montagu Douglas Scott died on 17 June 1944, at his home 'Shroner Wood', in Martyr Worthy, near Winchester, Hampshire. His estate was previously the home of Edwin Hillier, the grandfather of horticulturist Harold Hillier. He was 71 years old. At the time of his death, he was predeceased by one grandson, John Andrew Ferguson; he was survived by his wife, Marie Josephine, his three children, Claud Andrew, Marian Louisa and Patricia Katherine, and seven grandchildren.

== Honours and awards ==
- 19 April 1901: Distinguished Service Order
- 4 March 1912: Knight of Justice of the Order of St. John of Jerusalem
- 2 February 1916: Companion of the Order of St Michael and St George, for "services rendered in connection with military operations in the field"
- Mentioned in Despatches
- 1 May 1917: Officer of the Legion of Honour (France)
- 6 June 1922: His Majesty's Bodyguard of the Honourable Corps of Gentlemen at Arms
- 31 December 1930: Deputy Lieutenant of London
- Royal Company of Archers
- 2 April 1940: Hon. Air Commodore Auxiliary Air Force

== Ancestry ==
Ancestors of Lord Herbert Scott

16. Henry Scott, 3rd Duke of Buccleuch
8. Charles Montagu-Scott, 4th Duke of Buccleuch
17. Lady Elizabeth Montagu
4. Walter Montagu Douglas Scott, 5th Duke of Buccleuch
18. Thomas Townshend, 1st Viscount Sydney
9. The Hon. Harriet Katherine Townshend
19. Elizabeth Powys
2. William Montagu Douglas Scott, 6th Duke of Buccleuch
20. Thomas Thynne, 1st Marquess of Bath
10. Thomas Thynne, 2nd Marquess of Bath
21. Lady Elizabeth Bentick
5. Lady Charlotte Anne Thynne
22. George Byng, 4th Viscount Torrington
11. The Hon. Isabella Elizabeth Byng
23. Lady Lucy Boyle
1. Lord Andrew Montagu Douglas Scott
24. John Hamilton, 1st Marquess of Abercorn
12. James Hamilton, Viscount Hamilton
25. Catherine Copley
6. James Hamilton, 1st Duke of Abercorn
26. The Hon. John Douglas
13. Harriet Douglas
27. Lady Frances Lascelles
3. Lady Louisa Jane Hamilton
28. Francis Russell, Marquess of Tavistock
14. John Russell, 6th Duke of Bedford
29. Lady Elizabeth Keppel
7. Lady Louisa Jane Russell
30. Alexander Gordon, 4th Duke of Gordon
15. Lady Georgina Gordon
31. Jane Maxwell
