= Royal Scots Club =

Private military club in Edinburgh, Scotland

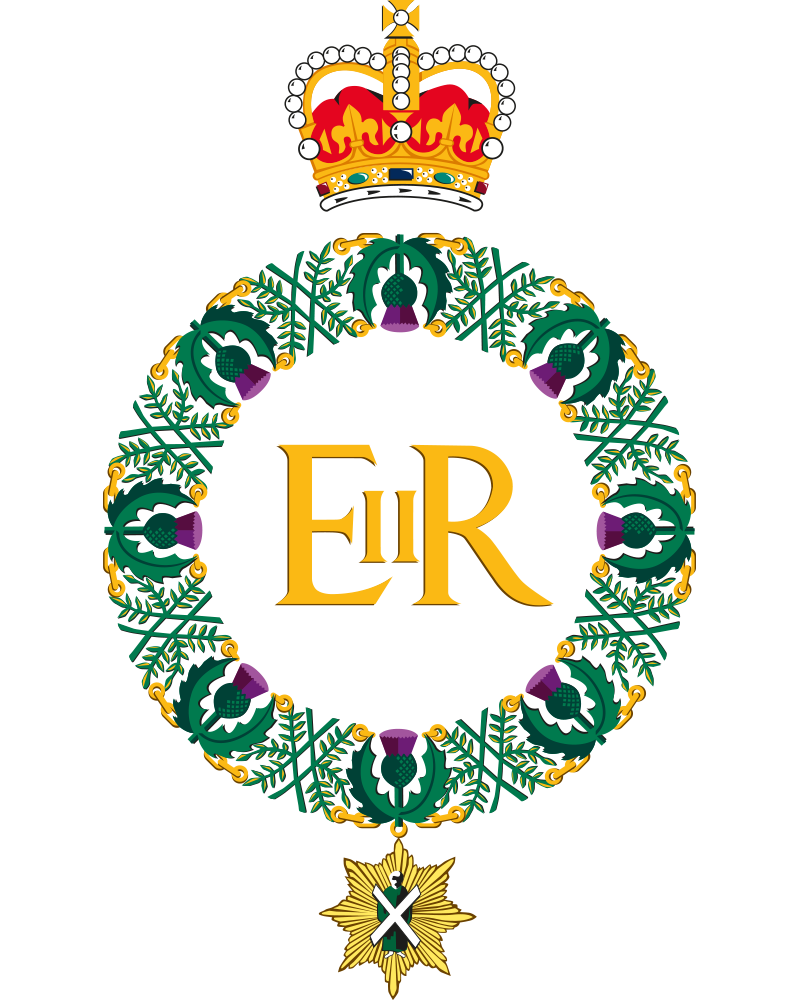

- Formation: 1919
- Type: Private members' club
- Location: 29-31 Abercromby Street, Edinburgh EH3 6QE
- Coordinates: 55.9563°N 3.1978°E
- Official language: English
- Chairman of Trustees: Brigadier George Lowder MBE
- Website: www.royalscotsclub.com

The Royal Scots Club is a private members' club located in the New Town, Edinburgh at 29-31 Abercromby Street, Edinburgh, EH3 6QE Scotland. The current patron of the club is Her Royal Highness Anne, Princess Royal.

== History ==
Formed in 1919 by Lord Henry Scott after World War I for all ranks of the Royal Scots (absorbed into the Royal Regiment of Scotland in 2006), the club commemorates the 11,162 members of the regiment killed in the war. The first patron of the club was Mary, Princess Royal and Countess of Harewood. Originally an all-ranks military club it is now open to wider membership, with preferential membership rates for military and ex-military personnel.

== Organisation ==
The club currently has over 2,000 members. The current chairman of trustees is Brigadier George Lowder MBE and the Board of Directors is chaired by Norman Soutar. The club Committee is chaired by Guy Richardson. Chairman of the Membership Committee is Guy Richardson and Regimental Secretary, Secretary to the Trustees, Board of Directors and Membership Committee is Lieutenant Colonel David Jack.

== Notable events ==
In 2019 the club honoured the Irish soldier and Royal Scot Joseph Prosser VC as a hero of the Crimean War. The club is used as a venue for plays during the Edinburgh Festival Fringe.

== Publications ==
- Duncan Macdougall (1999) A History of the Royal Scots Club (War Memorial): On the Occasion of the 80th Anniversary of the Founding of the Club J. R. Reid, Glasgow ISBN 9780948785047
- Robert H. Paterson (2001) Pontius Pilate's Bodyguard Royal Scots History Committee, Edinburgh ISBN 9780954090609
- Roddy Martine (2019) Not For Glory Nor Riches: One Hundred Years of the Royal Scots Club Birlinn, Edinburgh ISBN 9781780275673

== See also ==
- East India Club
- Naval and Military Club
- Royal Air Force Club
- Royal Over-Seas League
- The New Club
- Union Jack Club
- Victory Services Club
