= Leonard Knight Elmhirst =

British philanthropist and agronomist

Leonard Knight Elmhirst FRSA
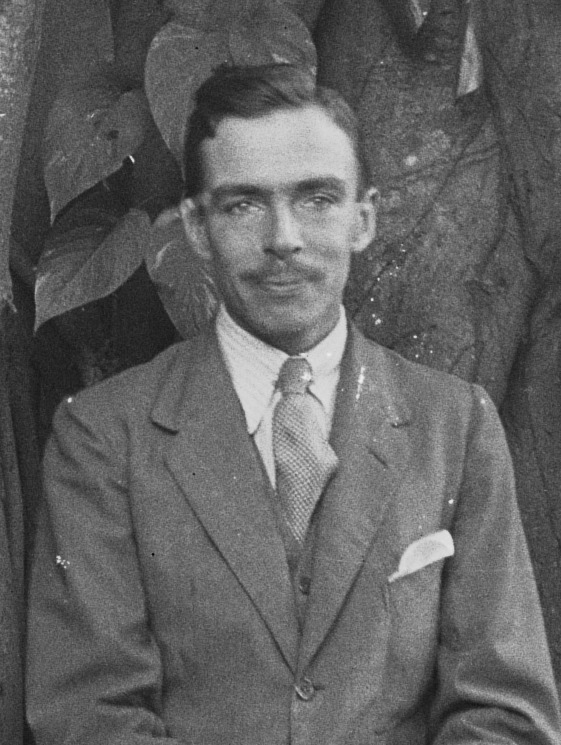
- Elmhirst in 1924

Chairman of the Dartington Trust
- In office 1931–1972
- Succeeded by: Maurice Ash

Devon County Councillor for Harberton
- In office 1937–1952

Personal details
- Born: 6 June 1893 Worsbrough, West Riding of Yorkshire, United Kingdom
- Died: 16 April 1974 (aged 80)
- Spouses: Dorothy Payne Whitney (m. 1925; died 1968) Susanna Isaacs (m. 1973)
- Children: 2
- Education: Trinity College, Cambridge; Cornell University
- Occupation: Philanthropist and agronomist
- Known for: Dartington Hall project in progressive education and rural reconstruction; Founded Institute of Rural Reconstruction, Sriniketan; Introduced artificial insemination of cattle to the UK; President, Royal Forestry Society; Member, Indian Rural Education Committee

Military service
- Allegiance: United Kingdom
- Branch/service: British Army
- Years of service: 1918–1919

Leonard Knight Elmhirst FRSA (6 June 1893 – 16 April 1974) was a British philanthropist and agronomist who worked extensively in India. He co-founded with his wife, Dorothy, the Dartington Hall project in progressive education and rural reconstruction.

== Biography ==
Leonard Elmhirst was born into a landed gentry family in Worsbrough (now part of Barnsley, Yorkshire), where the family seat is Houndhill. He was the second of nine siblings (eight boys and one girl). His elder brother, Captain William Elmhirst, was killed on 13 November 1916, aged 24, while serving with the 8th Battalion East Yorkshire Regiment during the Battle of the Somme, and the third son, Second Lieutenant Ernest Christopher Elmhirst, was killed on 7 August 1915, aged 20, while serving with the 8th Bn. Duke of Wellington's (West Riding Regiment) during the Gallipoli Campaign; both during World War I. The fourth son, Thomas became Air Marshal Sir Thomas Elmhirst (KBE, CB, AFC, DL, RAF).

In 1912 Leonard Elmhirst went up to Trinity College, Cambridge, to study history and theology, intending to follow his father into the Church. In 1914, he was deemed unfit for military service and volunteered for overseas service in the YMCA. His experience of the problems of rural India was to fundamentally change the direction of his career. After one year's service in the army he was demobilised in 1919 and entered Cornell University in Ithaca, New York to study agriculture. Arriving almost penniless, he completed a four-year degree course in two years. In 1920 he was elected president of Cornell's Cosmopolitan Club, which was mostly for foreign students, and found that it had large debts and depended on the philanthropy of its alumni and others. Money-raising activities brought him in contact with Dorothy Straight, who was to become his wife.

In America he also met the 1913 Nobel Laureate for Literature, Rabindranath Tagore, and in November 1921 returned to India as Tagore's secretary. In 1922, in the village of Surul (of which Sriniketan is a part) adjacent to Santiniketan, West Bengal, he set up for Tagore an Institute of Rural Reconstruction. Between 1923 and 1925, Leonard travelled twice around the globe, lecturing and supporting Rabindranath Tagore's missions to Europe, Asia and South America.

The influence of Tagore, and the interests and money of his wife to be, led Elmhirst to undertake an experiment in rural reconstruction at Dartington Hall in Devon. It is said that Tagore had become familiar with Dartington during his travels in England and influenced Elmhirst in his selection of the estate, which was purchased in a series of transactions in 1925. Elmhirst also assisted in the re-acquisition of his ancient family seat, Houndhill, a couple of miles from his birthplace.

== Works ==
In 1931, when the Dartington Hall experiment was established they set up a trust to manage its affairs so they could undertake other work worldwide. Leonard's work included:

- Work for Exeter University, Devon County Council and local organisations
- 1929: launched the International Conference of Agricultural Economists
- 1931: helped to found the policy think tank Political and Economic Planning
- 1932: brought artificial insemination of cattle from Russia to Devon
- President of the Royal Forestry Society
- War-time public service during World War II including agricultural missions to the Middle East and India
- Irrigation and hydroelectricity in the Damodar Valley, India
- 1954: Member, Indian Rural Education Committee

== Personal life ==
Leonard married Dorothy Payne Whitney in September 1925. They had two children. He was the stepfather of racing driver and aviator Whitney Straight (1912–1979), actress Beatrice Straight (1914–2001) and writer and KGB spy Michael Whitney Straight (1916–2004). Their daughter Ruth married the environmentalist Maurice Ash. On the occasion of the 25th wedding anniversary of Leonard and Dorothy Elmhirst in 1950, Benjamin Britten composed Five Flower Songs, a cycle of part songs premiered in the open air at Dartington, conducted by Imogen Holst. After Dorothy died, Leonard married Susanna Isaacs-Elmhirst in 1973 in Worsborough, Yorkshire.

== Honours ==
In 1946 he refused the offer of a barony from Prime Minister Clement Attlee. In a letter to Attlee he replied that "My own work, however, as you know, has lain in the main among country people...in India, the USA and in Devonshire...acceptance would neither be easy for me to explain nor easy for my friends to comprehend". In 1972, he declined another honour from Ted Heath.

He received honorary doctorates from Freiburg (D.Pol.Sci.), Visva-Bharati (D.Litt.), the University of Durham (D.C.L.), the University of Oxford (D.C.L.), and the University of Exeter (D.C.L.). He was elected a Fellow of the Royal Society of Arts in 1926 and a fellow of the American Farm Economic Association in 1960.

He was elected Honorary President of the Devonshire Association in 1959.
