= Lord George Scott =

Scottish cricketer and soldier

Lord George Scott OBE, DL
- Born: 31 August 1866; Selkirkshire, Scotland
- Died: 23 February 1947 (aged 80); Melrose, Scottish Borders, Scotland
- Alma mater: Christ Church, Oxford
- Spouse: Lady Elizabeth Manners (m. 1903; died 1924)
- Children: 5
- Military career
- Allegiance: United Kingdom
- Branch: British Army
- Rank: Captain
- Unit: 10th Hussars
- Commands: 2/1st Lothians and Border Horse
- Wars: Second Boer War; World War I
- Awards: OBE
- Cricket career

Cricket information

Domestic team information
- Years: Team
- Oxford University
- Middlesex County Cricket Club
- Marylebone Cricket Club

Lord George William Montagu Douglas Scott, OBE, DL (31 August 1866 – 23 February 1947) was a Scottish cricketer and soldier who was the third son of William Montagu Douglas Scott, 6th Duke of Buccleuch.

== Early life ==
Scott was born in Bowhill, Selkirkshire, the third son of William Montagu Douglas Scott, 6th Duke of Buccleuch. He was the brother of John Montagu Douglas Scott, 7th Duke of Buccleuch and Princess Alice, Duchess of Gloucester was his niece.

He was educated at Eton and Christ Church, Oxford. He played first-class cricket for various teams including Middlesex, Marylebone Cricket Club (MCC) and Oxford University from 1884 to 1905. He represented the Gentlemen in the Gentlemen v Players series. He was also Master of the Buccleuch Hunt.

== Military career ==
Scott was commissioned a second lieutenant in the 10th Hussars on 27 March 1889, was promoted to the rank of lieutenant on 11 June 1890, and to captain on 25 June 1897. He served in the Second Boer War in South Africa, where he was wounded, and left the regular army in August 1902 after his return to the United Kingdom. He later commanded the 2/1st Lothians and Border Horse, a Yeomanry (later Territorial Army) regiment, through World War I until January 1919 when he retired.

He was appointed OBE in the 1919 Birthday Honours. He was a Deputy Lieutenant of Roxburghshire.

== Personal life ==
In 1903, Scott married Lady Elizabeth Manners (died 1924), the youngest daughter of John Manners, 7th Duke of Rutland and, his second wife, Janetta Manners, Duchess of Rutland. Together they had two sons and three daughters, including:

- Phyllis Anne Montagu Douglas Scott (1904–1978), who married Thomas Cholmondeley, 4th Baron Delamere, son of Hugh Cholmondeley, 3rd Baron Delamere and Lady Florence Anne Cole (a daughter of the 4th Earl of Enniskillen), in 1924. They were the parents of Hugh Cholmondeley, 5th Baron Delamere.
- Jeanetta Ruth Montagu Douglas Scott (1906–1997), who married Maj. James Stirling-Home-Drummond-Moray, 21st of Abercairny, son of Capt. William Stirling-Home-Drummond-Moray, 20th of Abercairny, and Hon. Gwendolen Edwardes (a daughter of the 4th Baron Kensington), in 1937.
- Marjorie Katherine Montagu Douglas Scott (1906–1994), who married Maj. Thomas Archibald Hacket-Pain, son of Brig.-Gen. Sir William Hacket-Pain, in 1935. After he was killed in action during World War II, she married Adam Bell, son of Frank Bell, in 1943.
- John Henry Montagu Douglas Scott (1911–1991), a Lt.-Col. in the 9th Lancers who married Anne Peace Arabella Mackintosh, daughter of Capt. Angus Alexander Mackintosh of Mackintosh, and Lady Maud Louisa Emma Cavendish (eldest daughter of the 9th Duke of Devonshire), in 1954.
- Claud Everard Walter Montagu Douglas Scott (1915–1994), a Lt.-Col. in the Lothians and Border Horse who married Margaret Frances Philips, daughter of Brig.-Gen. Lewis Francis Philips, in 1941.

Lord George died in Melrose, Scottish Borders.
