= Houndhill =

Manor house in Worsbrough, South Yorkshire, England

Coordinates: 53.5329°N 1.4927°W

Houndhill is a substantial Grade II* listed Tudor Farmhouse (part timber-framed) in Worsbrough, near Barnsley, in South Yorkshire, England.

The present house, which dates from the late 16th century with 17th-century additions, was originally built by Robert Elmhirst. His son Richard Elmhirst, who sided with the Royalists, constructed the fortifications in 1642 at the beginning of the English Civil War. It was extensively renovated in 1934.

The house is built in ashlar, with a stone slate roof in two storeys to an H-shaped plan. The older wing is timber framed.

== History ==
The first specific reference to land at Houndhill appears in a lawsuit of 1556, but it is not known when the land was acquired or when the first house was built there. However, the first known reference to the family of Elmhirst living in the district appears in the Rockley Manor Court Rolls of 1340 (The Manor of Rockley adjoined the Manor of Worsbrough) when Roger Elmhirst was fined four pence for allowing his two horses to stray into the meadow of the Lord of the Manor. When Richard Elmhirst was involved in a lawsuit following his father's death in 1618 he deposed that: "Houndhill and Elmhirst are both copyhold and had been demised to his ancestors for twelve descents last past."

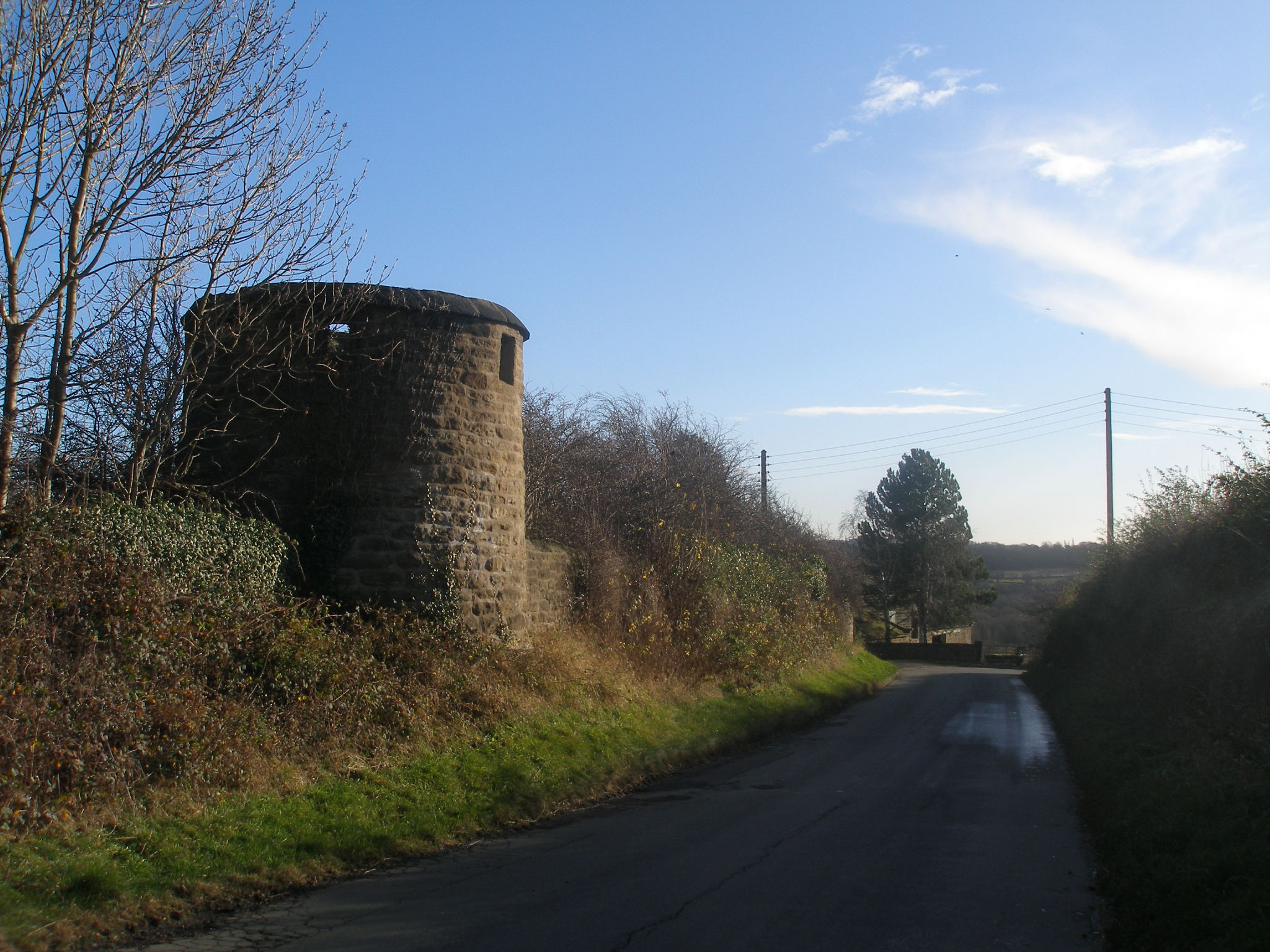
Tower at Houndhill

Richard Elmhirst inherited Houndhill in 1626 after the lawsuit following his father's death. During this period Richard was employed by Sir Thomas Wentworth who made him Deputy Collector of Recusant Rents in York. Siding with King Charles I, Richard fortified Houndhill (probably in 1642) by constructing two towers and an incomplete surrounding wall. Tradition has it that Houndhill was taken rather easily by Sir Thomas Fairfax in the summer of 1643: "On Sir Thomas coming in person to demand the surrender of Houndhill, Elmhirst immediately complied with this demand, and would have been killed by some of the soldiers, but Sir Thomas, who had a kindness for him, prevented it."

In 1645 Richard had to face Cromwell's sequestrators to reveal his wealth. After a lengthy and contested enquiry he was ordered to pay a fine of £666, which was finally paid in 1650. Richard died in 1654 leaving a wife and nine children. It appears that Richard was granted the Elmhirst Arms in 1647, well before Dugdale's visitation in 1665, which confirmed Richard's right to bear arms.

When Richard's son, also Richard Elmhirst, died in 1673 some of his land passed to his brother William, but Houndhill and the rest of his wealth passed to his daughter Elizabeth who married John Copley. Houndhill subsequently passed into the ownership of Capt F. W. T. V. Wentworth.

In 1932 Alfred O. Elmhirst negotiated the re-purchase of Houndhill on behalf of his brother, the noted philanthropist Leonard Knight Elmhirst. Houndhill then underwent substantial restoration. In 1950 it was gifted by Leonard Elmhirst to A. O. Elmhirst who lived at Houndhill from 1932 until his death in 1995. Their brother was Air Marshal Sir Thomas Elmhirst, Commander-in-Chief Royal Indian Air Force and Lieutenant-Governor of Guernsey.

Houndhill and its surrounding farmland suffered from severe coal mining subsidence for most of the 20th century although the family benefited from the mining royalties paid during the 19th century and the early part of the 20th century. In 1972 the character of the valley below Houndhill was changed when the M1 motorway was routed through it. The house and the surrounding land remain in the possession of the family which can now record continuous ownership of land in Worsbrough for more than 20 generations.

== Elmhirst family ==
Details of the family appear in Burke's Landed Gentry although the pedigree in that book is incomplete as it does not show Richard Elmhirst (1738–1805) who was the third son of Thomas Elmhirst (1692–1769). Richard's son Philip (1781–1866) was a Midshipman on HMS Africa (1781) at the Battle of Trafalgar for which he was granted 2000 acres of land near Peterborough, Ontario, Canada. He was joined there by his brother Joseph, who had eight children. Some of that land is still owned by Elmhirsts who are very numerous in Canada. So far as is known, all living Elmhirsts are descended from Thomas Elmhirst (1649–1696) an Alderman and merchant of Boston, Lincolnshire, England.
