= William Dummer (disambiguation) =

William Dummer may refer to:

- William Dummer (1677–1761), royal lieutenant governor and acting governor of the province of Massachusetts Bay
- William Dummer (cricketer) (1847–1922), English cricketer

== See also ==
- William Dummer Powell (1755–1834), lawyer, judge and politician of Canada
