= Edmund Dummer =

Edmund Dummer may refer to:

- Edmund Dummer (lawyer) (1663–1724), English lawyer
- Edmund Dummer (naval engineer) (1651–1713), English naval engineer, shipbuilder, and Member of Parliament
