= Louisa Montagu-Douglas-Scott, Duchess of Buccleuch =

British Duchess

Her Grace The Duchess of Buccleuch and Queensberry VA
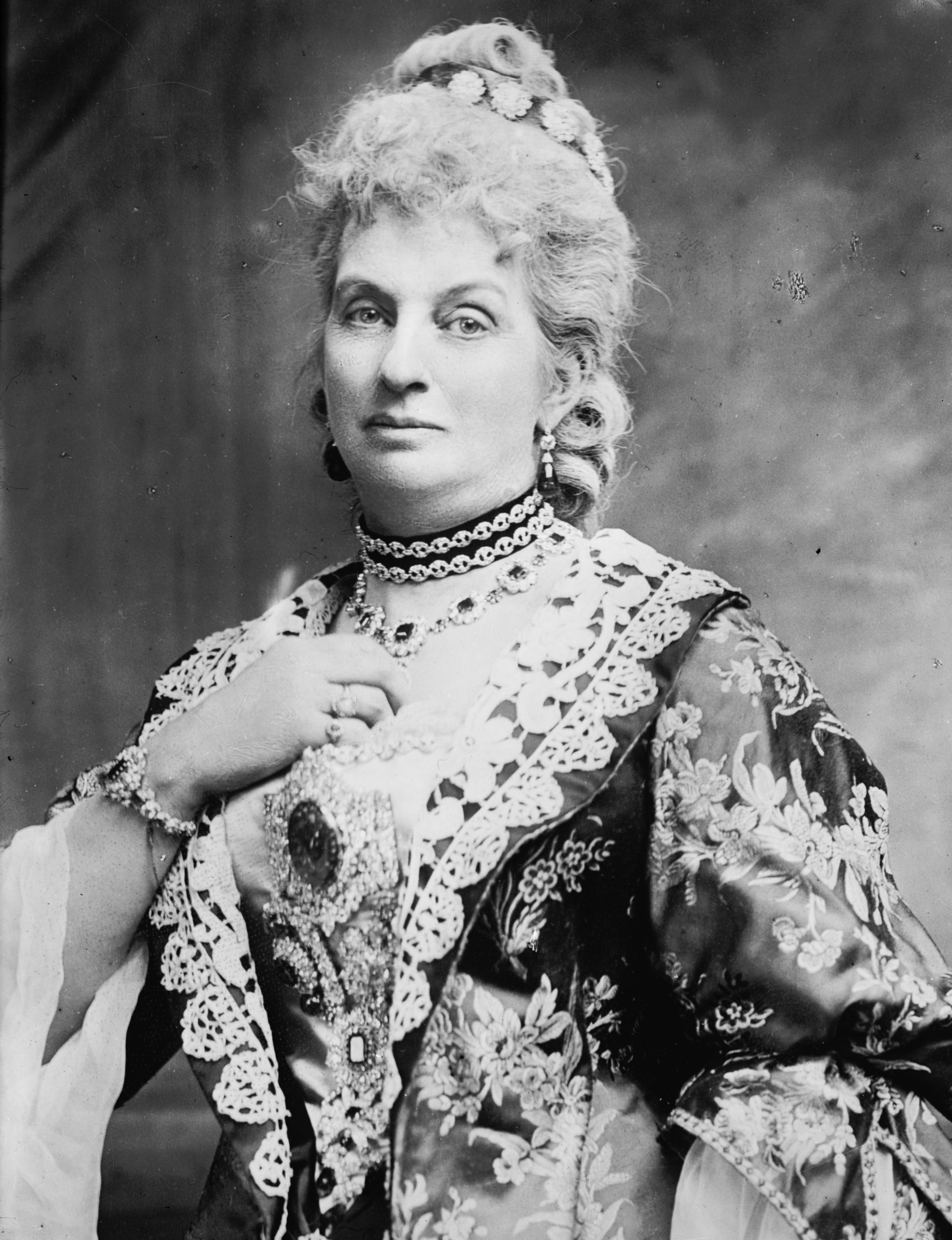
- The Duchess of Buccleuch dressed as Elizabeth, Duchess of Buccleuch, at the Devonshire House Ball of 1897

Personal details
- Born: Lady Louisa Jane Hamilton; 26 August 1836 Brighton, Sussex, England
- Died: 16 March 1912 (aged 75) Dalkeith Palace, Midlothian, Scotland
- Resting place: St. Mary's Church, Dalkeith Palace, Midlothian, Scotland
- Spouse: William Montagu Douglas Scott, 6th Duke of Buccleuch (m. 1859)
- Children: Walter Henry Montagu Douglas Scott, Earl of Dalkeith; John Montagu Douglas Scott, 7th Duke of Buccleuch; Lord George Scott; Lord Henry Montagu Douglas Scott; Lord Herbert Montagu Douglas Scott; Katherine Brand, Viscountess Hampden; Lady Constance Cairns; Lord Francis Montagu Douglas Scott
- Parent(s): James Hamilton, 1st Duke of Abercorn; Lady Louisa Jane Russell
- Occupation: Mistress of the Robes to Queen Victoria and Queen Alexandra

Louisa Jane Montagu-Douglas-Scott, Duchess of Buccleuch and Queensberry VA (née Hamilton; 26 August 1836 – 16 March 1912) was the daughter of James Hamilton, 1st Duke of Abercorn. In 1884, she became the Duchess of Buccleuch and Duchess of Queensberry, the wife of William Henry Walter Montagu Douglas Scott, 6th Duke of Buccleuch and 8th Duke of Queensberry. She was the paternal grandmother of Princess Alice, Duchess of Gloucester, and of Marian Louisa, Lady Elmhirst. She served as Mistress of the Robes to Queen Victoria and then to Queen Alexandra.

== Early life, marriage, and family ==
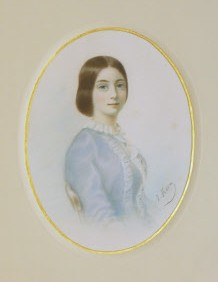
Pastel portrait of Louisa Jane Hamilton, Duchess of Buccleuch (1836–1912), c. 1855

Louisa Jane Hamilton was born on Friday 26 August 1836 in Brighton, Sussex, England, the third child of fourteen children born to James Hamilton, 1st Duke of Abercorn, and the former Lady Louisa Russell, daughter of John Russell, 6th Duke of Bedford.

She married William Montagu Douglas Scott, Earl of Dalkeith, on 22 November 1859 in London. Lord Dalkeith was the eldest son of the Walter Montagu Douglas Scott, 5th Duke of Buccleuch, and his wife, the former Lady Charlotte Thynne. They had six sons and two daughters:

- Walter Henry Montagu Douglas Scott, Earl of Dalkeith (17 January 1861 – 18 September 1886)
- John Charles Montagu Douglas Scott, 7th Duke of Buccleuch (30 March 1864 – 19 October 1935)
- Lord George William Montagu Douglas Scott (31 August 1866 – 23 February 1947); married on 30 April 1903 Lady Elizabeth Emily Manners (daughter of John Manners, 7th Duke of Rutland and Janetta Hughan) and had issue
- Lord Henry Francis Montagu Douglas Scott (15 January 1868 – 19 April 1945)
- Lord Herbert Andrew Montagu Douglas Scott (30 November 1872 – 17 June 1944); married 26 April 1905 Marie Josephine Edwards and had issue, maternal grandfather of Sarah Ferguson
- Lady Katharine Mary Montagu Douglas Scott (25 March 1875 – 7 March 1951); married Thomas Brand, 3rd Viscount Hampden, and had issue
- Lady Constance Anne Montagu Douglas Scott (10 March 1877 – 7 May 1970); married on 21 January 1908 The Hon. Douglas Halyburton Cairns (son of Hugh Cairns, 1st Earl Cairns and Mary Harriet McNeill) and had issue
- Lord Francis George Montagu Douglas Scott (1 November 1879 – 26 July 1952); married on 11 February 1915 Lady Eileen Nina Evelyn Sibell Elliot-Murray-Kynynmound (daughter of Gilbert Elliot-Murray-Kynynmound, 4th Earl of Minto, and Lady Mary Caroline Grey) and had issue

== Career ==
She served as Mistress of the Robes to Queen Victoria from 1885 – 1892 (Conservative), and again from 1895 – 1901. She was appointed Mistress of the Robes to Queen Alexandra in 1901, a position in which she served until her death in 1912.

== Death ==
The duchess died on Saturday 16 March 1912, in her 76th year, at Dalkeith Palace, Midlothian, Scotland. She was survived by her husband, and seven of her children and their families. She was buried on Wednesday 20 March 1912 in the Buccleuch family crypt in St. Mary's Church, Dalkeith Palace, Midlothian, Scotland.

== Titles, styles, and honours ==
- 26 August 1836 - 16 April 1884: Lady Louisa Hamilton
- 16 April 1884 – 1912: The Duchess of Buccleuch and Queensberry

=== Honours ===
- 1885: Invested as Lady, Royal Order of Victoria and Albert (VA), 3rd Class
- 1885 – 1892 and 1895 – 1901: Mistress of the Robes to Queen Victoria
- 1901 – 1912: Mistress of the Robes to Queen Alexandra

Court offices
Preceded by The Duchess of Roxburghe	Mistress of the Robes to Queen Victoria; 1885–1886	Succeeded by The Duchess of Bedford
Preceded by The Duchess of Bedford	Mistress of the Robes to Queen Victoria; 1886–1892	Succeeded by The Duchess of Roxburghe and The Dowager Duchess of Atholl
Preceded by The Duchess of Roxburghe and The Dowager Duchess of Atholl	Mistress of the Robes to Queen Victoria; 1895–1901	Succeeded by —
Preceded by —	Mistress of the Robes to Queen Alexandra; 1901–1912	Succeeded by The Duchess of Portland
