= Prince William of Gloucester =

British prince (1941–1972)

Prince William
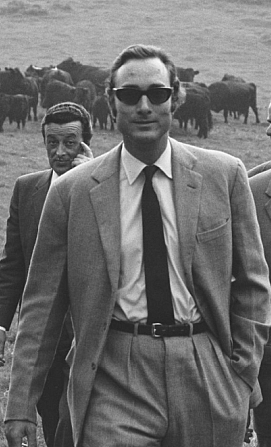
- William in 1971
- Born: 18 December 1941; Barnet, Hertfordshire, England
- Died: 28 August 1972 (aged 30); Bobbington, Staffordshire, England
- Cause of death: Airplane crash
- Burial: 2 September 1972; Royal Burial Ground, Frogmore, Windsor, Berkshire
Names
- William Henry Andrew Frederick
- House: Windsor
- Father: Prince Henry, Duke of Gloucester
- Mother: Lady Alice Montagu Douglas Scott
- Education: Magdalene College, Cambridge; Stanford University

Prince William of Gloucester (William Henry Andrew Frederick; 18 December 1941 – 28 August 1972) was a member of the British royal family. The elder son of Prince Henry, Duke of Gloucester, and Princess Alice, Duchess of Gloucester, he was a grandson of George V, nephew of Edward VIII and George VI, and first cousin of Elizabeth II. At birth, he was fourth in line to the throne; by the time of his death, he was ninth. A graduate of Cambridge and Stanford, he joined the Foreign and Commonwealth Office, serving in Lagos and Tokyo before returning to undertake royal duties.

He was the most recent descendant of George III to be diagnosed with porphyria, a condition thought to have caused George III's mental breakdown, and in William's case, it was most likely hereditary. William died in 1972, aged 30, in an air crash while piloting his plane during a competition.

== Early life ==
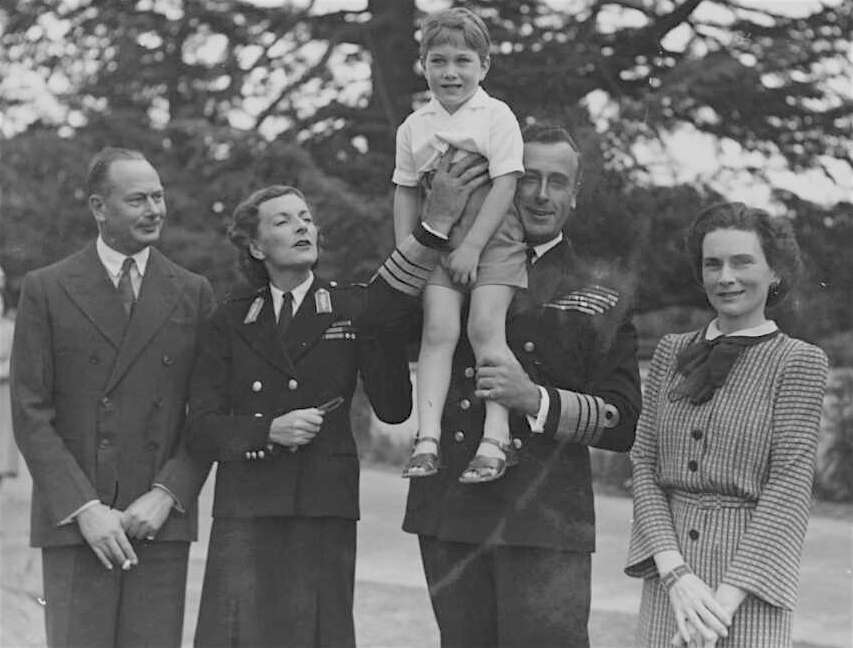
William as a young boy in Canberra in 1946, with his parents (far left and far right) and Lord and Lady Mountbatten

William was born on 18 December 1941 at the Lady Carnarvon Nursing Home in Hadley Common, Hertfordshire, the eldest son of Prince Henry, Duke of Gloucester, and Alice, Duchess of Gloucester. His father was the third son of King George V and Queen Mary, and his mother was the third daughter of the 7th Duke of Buccleuch and Lady Margaret Bridgeman. He had a younger brother, Richard.

He was baptised in the Private Chapel at Windsor Castle on 22 February 1942 by Cosmo Gordon Lang, Archbishop of Canterbury. His godparents were King George VI (his paternal uncle), Queen Mary (his paternal grandmother), Princess Helena Victoria (his paternal first cousin twice-removed), Lady Margaret Hawkins (his maternal aunt), Major Lord William Montagu Douglas Scott (his maternal uncle) and John Vereker, 6th Viscount Gort, who was unable to attend. Owing to wartime restrictions, newspapers did not disclose the location of the christening and stated instead that it took place at "a private chapel in the country".

At the time of William's birth, and for months afterwards, Henry was away on military duties, some involving considerable risk. This prompted George VI to write to his sister-in-law, assuring her that, should anything happen to his brother, he would become William's guardian.

In 1947, William served as a page boy at the wedding of his cousin Princess Elizabeth to Philip, Duke of Edinburgh. The other page boy was Prince Michael of Kent. In 1953, he attended her coronation.

William spent his early childhood at Barnwell Manor in Northamptonshire and later in Canberra, Australia, where his father served as Governor-General from 1945 to 1947. After returning to England, he was educated at Wellesley House School, a prep school in Broadstairs, Kent, then at Eton College, where he was noted in the Eton College Chronicle for his performance in junior cricket and awarded house colours for football. After leaving Eton in 1960, he went up to Magdalene College, Cambridge, to read history, graduating with a BA in 1963, later raised to an MA (Cantab.) in 1968. He then undertook a post-baccalaureate year at Stanford University, studying political science, American history, and business.

== Career ==
After returning to Britain, William took a position with Lazards, a merchant bank.

He was the second member of the British royal family to work in the civil service or diplomatic service, the being his uncle, Prince George, Duke of Kent, in the 1920s. He joined the Commonwealth Office in 1965 and was posted to Lagos as third secretary at the British High Commission. In 1968, he transferred to Tokyo as second secretary (commercial) in the British Embassy.

By 1970, his father's health had deteriorated following further strokes. William resigned from the diplomatic service and returned to Britain to manage his father's estate and, as he put it, take on the full‑time role of a royal prince. On his way back, he represented the Queen at the celebrations marking the termination of Tonga's status as a protected state. For the next two years, he managed Barnwell Manor and began to carry out public duties as a member of the royal family.

William also took over many engagements his father could no longer perform. He became increasingly active in St John Ambulance. He was President of National Ski Federation Supporters' Association, the Magdalene Society (Cambridge), the East Midlands Tourist Board, and the Royal African Society. His patronages included the Royal Anthropological Institute of Great Britain, the British Schools Exploring Society and the Talyllyn Railway Preservation Society.

William occasionally served as Counsellor of State during the Queen's absence.

== Personal life ==
William was consistently described by friends as adventurous, almost to the point of recklessness, warm, tender and extremely generous. Of all his qualities, the one most often mentioned was his loyalty to friends. One account noted that he was particularly kind to friends who were "ill, unpopular with others, or even downright embarrassing". His status and circumstances also influenced his personality and he could, at times, be "tiresomely selfish". He led an active life, flying Piper aircraft, trekking through the Sahara, and hot air ballooning.

Regarding his family, William considered himself extremely lucky compared to other members of the royal family. He had a close relationship with both his parents, especially with his mother, of whom he said, "She is a human being and she must possess some faults. But so far as I am concerned she has no faults at all". He was also very fond of his father; one friend described his love and tenderness for him as "infectious". William acknowledged that his father could not have been very happy as a young man, owing to the strict upbringing he had received, and expressed gratitude for the freedom he had been given throughout his life.

=== Relationships ===
Former Hungarian model and stewardess Zsuzsi Starkloff (1936–2020, born Zsuzsana Maria Lehel in a Jewish-Hungarian family) had a relationship with William. They first met in 1968 in Japan, where Starkloff worked, having previously divorced American pilot Edward Starkloff. The last time they met in person was in August 1970. The relationship was further explored in the 2015 Channel 4 TV documentary, The Other Prince William. Despite the reported reluctance of senior members of the royal family to take William's relationship with Starkloff seriously, marriage standards within the royal family were no longer as strict as they had been. Princess Margaret, while not encouraging William, sympathised with him in this regard and advised him to "wait a bit" and "see how everything looks" once he returned to Britain. Once back in England, Starkloff went to stay with his family at Barnwell Manor, where his parents were reportedly kind and accommodating. William's intentions regarding his relationship with Starkloff are unclear. In the year of his death, he gave an interview to Audrey Whiting for the Sunday Mirror, in which he stated that if he ever married, he would do so to a woman not only right for him, but right in "the eyes of other members of the Family".

In the early 1970s, William began a relationship with divorcee Nicole Sieff (née Moschietto), daughter of a Monte Carlo restaurateur, who had two sons from her marriage to Jonathan Sieff, grandson of Israel Sieff, Baron Sieff.

=== Health ===
Shortly before transferring to Tokyo in August 1968, William was examined by a Royal Air Force doctor, Headly Bellringer, at the request of his mother. He reported having suffered from jaundice beginning in December 1965 and lasting several months. He had subsequently noticed that his skin was prone to a blistering rash, particularly when exposed to sunlight. Bellringer tentatively diagnosed porphyria, prescribed sunblock cream, and gave him a medical warning card regarding the need to avoid certain medications. Although aware of the theory of the royal family's history of porphyria then being advanced by Ida Macalpine and Richard Hunter, Bellringer stated that he "tried not to let it influence him...with all the symptoms, I was left with little option but to diagnose the Prince's condition as porphyria." He was later examined by haematologists at Addenbrooke's Hospital in Cambridge, and also by Professor Ishihara in Tokyo; both concluded that he was suffering from variegate porphyria, by then in remission.

A reliable diagnosis of porphyria in a member of the British royal family lent weight to the theory – first advanced by Professor Ida Macalpine in the late 1960s – that porphyria was the underlying cause of the ill-health of both Mary, Queen of Scots (an ancestor of both of William's parents) and George III. The theory further proposed that the disorder may have been inherited by members of the royal families of the United Kingdom, Prussia, and several German duchies and principalities.

== Death ==
A licensed pilot and President of the British Light Aviation Centre, William owned several aircraft and competed in amateur air show races. On 28 August 1972, he was competing in the Goodyear International Air Trophy at Halfpenny Green near Wolverhampton. Vyrell Mitchell – a pilot with whom he had often raced – was listed as a passenger. Shortly before the race started, the wind direction changed and a different take-off runway was brought into use. This required the race participants to turn left as soon as possible after take-off to establish themselves in the previously planned race circuit. Shortly after take-off and while at a very low altitude, the Piper Cherokee banked steeply into the left turn; the bank angle was so great that the pilot was unable to maintain height and the aircraft sank towards the ground until its port wing hit a tree, shearing off. The out-of-control plane flipped over and crashed into an earthen bank, bursting into flames, and killing William, aged 30, and Mitchell. The crash occurred in front of approximately 30,000 spectators. The fire took two hours to bring under control, and the two men were formally identified at the inquest the following day through dental records.

His father was in such poor health at the time of his death that his mother hesitated whether to tell him. She later admitted in her memoirs that she did not, but that he may have learned of their son's death from television coverage.

William was buried in the Royal Burial Ground, Frogmore. The comprehensive school in Oundle, which he opened in 1971, was renamed Prince William School in his memory. His will was sealed in London after his death in 1972. His estate was valued at £416,001 (or £3.9 million in 2022 when adjusted for inflation).

William was the heir apparent of his father's peerages, Duke of Gloucester, Earl of Ulster, and Baron Culloden. Upon his death, his younger brother, Richard, became heir apparent, and succeeded to these peerages in 1974. William was the first grandchild of King George V and Queen Mary to die.

== Honours and arms ==
Prince William's coat of arms

=== Honours ===
- Counsellor of State, 1962–1971
- Recipient of the Queen Elizabeth II Coronation Medal, 2 June 1953
- Knight of Justice of the Order of St John (KStJ), 1969
- Commander-in-Chief of the St John Ambulance Brigade, 1968
- Fellow of the Royal Geographical Society (FRGS), 1971

=== Arms ===
For his 21st birthday, in 1962, William was granted the use of the Royal Arms, differenced with a label argent of five points, the outer pair and central point bearing lions gules, the inner pair crosses gules.
