= John Montagu Douglas Scott, 7th Duke of Buccleuch =

Scottish politician

His Grace The Duke of Buccleuch and Queensberry KT GCVO
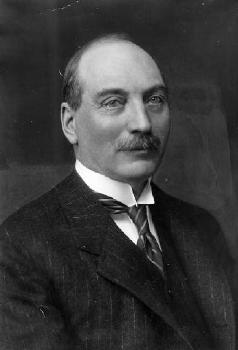

Personal details
- Born: 30 March 1864 Montagu House, Whitehall, London, England
- Died: 19 October 1935 (aged 71) Bowhill House, Selkirk, Scotland
- Spouse: Lady Margaret Bridgeman (m. 1893)
- Children: Lady Margaret Hawkins; Walter Montagu Douglas Scott, 8th Duke of Buccleuch; Lord William Montagu Douglas Scott; Lady Sybil Phipps; Princess Alice, Duchess of Gloucester; Mary Cecil, Lady Burghley; Lady Angela Dawnay; Lord George Montagu Douglas Scott
- Parents: William Montagu Douglas Scott, 6th Duke of Buccleuch; Lady Louisa Hamilton

John Charles Montagu Douglas Scott, 7th Duke of Buccleuch and 9th Duke of Queensberry, KT, GCVO (30 March 1864 – 19 October 1935), styled The Honourable John Montagu Douglas Scott until 1884, Lord John Montagu Douglas Scott between 1884 and 1886 and Earl of Dalkeith until 1914 was a British Member of Parliament and peer. He was the father of Princess Alice, Duchess of Gloucester.

== Early life ==
Buccleuch was born in 1864, the son of William Montagu Douglas Scott, 6th Duke of Buccleuch and Lady Louisa Hamilton. He was the second of eight children. His elder brother, Walter Henry, Earl of Dalkeith, was killed in a deer-hunting accident in Achnacary Forest, at the age of 25. Walter was unmarried, and the title of Earl of Dalkeith passed to John. He was a direct male-line descendant of Charles II. In 1881, he served as a Midshipman in the Royal Navy onboard HMS Bacchante with the grandsons of Queen Victoria – Prince Albert Victor, Duke of Clarence and Avondale and Prince George of Wales, later George V of the United Kingdom. He was promoted to the rank of Lieutenant in September 1883.

During the First World War, he vacated the family's ancestral London home, Montagu House, Whitehall, which was taken over as Government Offices. The Duke took a new London residence at No. 2 Grosvenor Place.

== Career ==
Buccleuch held the following posts:

- 1895–1906: Member of Parliament (MP), Conservative, for Roxburghshire
- 1886: Deputy Lieutenant (DL) of Edinburgh
- 1887: Deputy Lieutenant (DL) of Dumfriesshire
- Justice of the Peace (JP) for Selkirk and Roxburghshire
- 1893: Vice Lord Lieutenant (DL) of Selkirk
- 1896: Deputy Lieutenant (DL) of Roxburghshire
- 1915–1935: Lord-Lieutenant of Dumfriesshire
- 1926–1935: Lord Clerk Register for Scotland

== Marriage and family ==
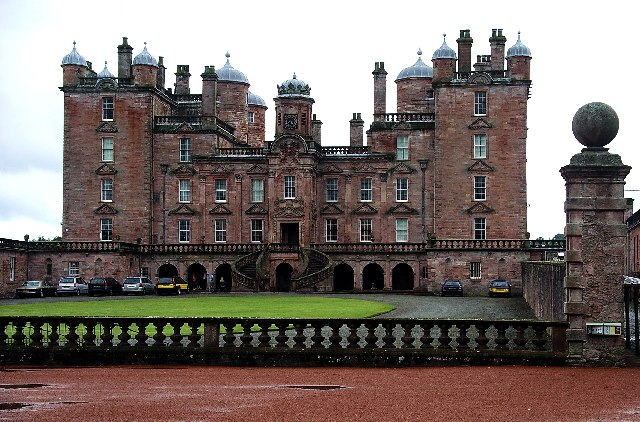
Drumlanrig Castle, Dumfries and Galloway – a seat of the Dukes of Buccleuch

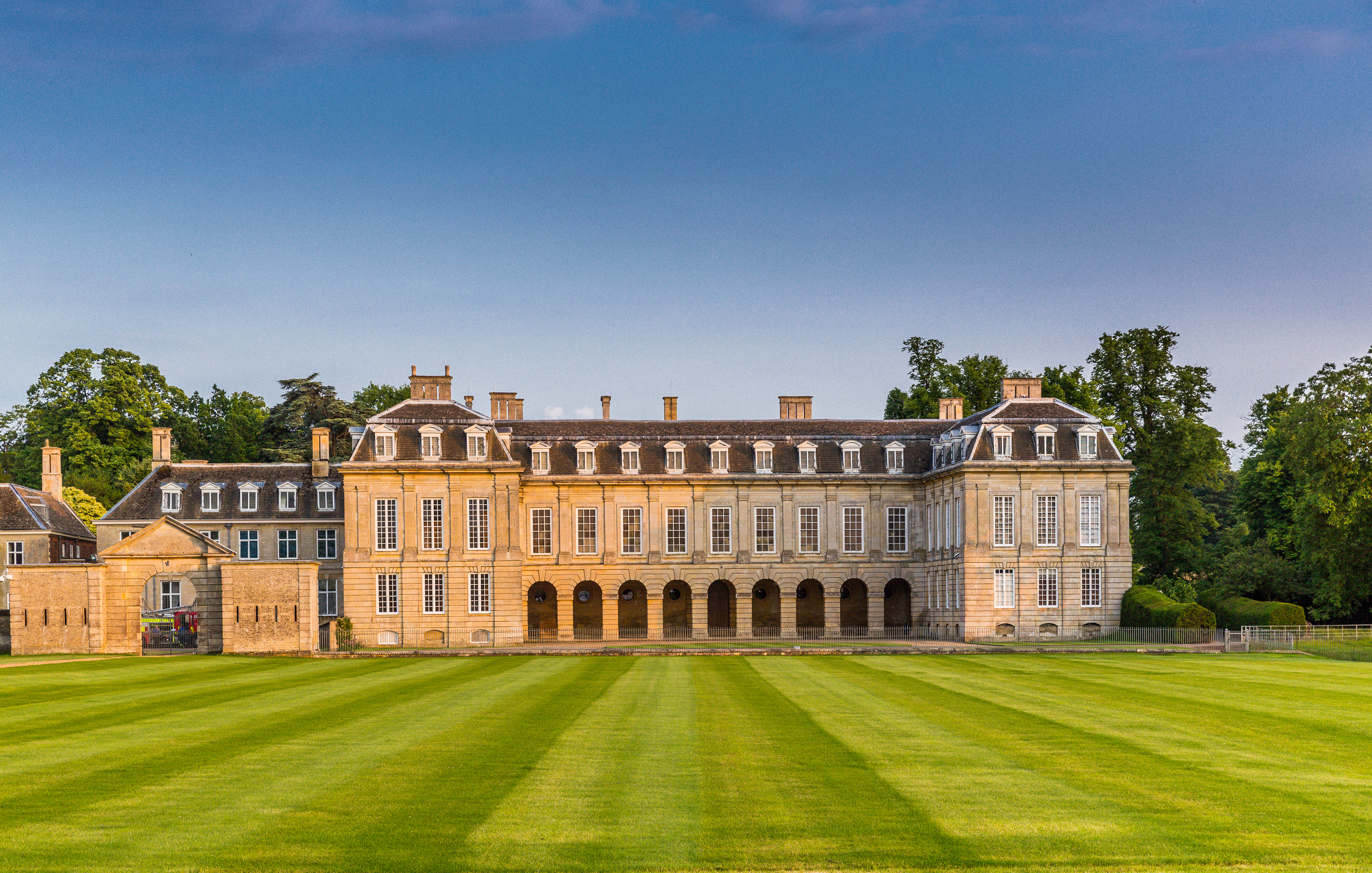
Boughton House, Northamptonshire – a seat of the Dukes of Buccleuch

On Monday 30 January 1893, John married at St Paul's Church, Knightsbridge Lady Margaret Alice "Molly" Bridgeman (20 January 1872 – 7 August 1954), daughter of George Bridgeman, 4th Earl of Bradford, and Lady Ida Frances Annabella Lumley, daughter of Richard Lumley, 9th Earl of Scarbrough. They had eight children:

- Lady Margaret Ida Montagu Douglas Scott (13 November 1893 – 17 December 1976); she married Admiral Sir Geoffrey Alan Brooke Hawkins (13 July 1895 – 5 October 1980) on 16 February 1926, and had three children, including Anne Wall.
- Walter John Montagu Douglas Scott, 8th Duke of Buccleuch (30 December 1894 – 4 October 1973); he married Vreda Esther Mary Lascelles on 21 April 1921, had three children.
- Lord William Walter Montagu Douglas Scott (17 January 1896 – 30 January 1958); he married Lady Rachel Douglas-Home (daughter of Charles Douglas-Home, 13th Earl of Home and sister of future Prime Minister Sir Alec Douglas-Home) on 27 April 1937, had five children.
- Lady Sybil Anne Montagu Douglas Scott (14 July 1899 – 1 November 1990); she married Charles Phipps on 14 May 1919, had four children.
- Lady Alice Christabel Montagu Douglas Scott (25 December 1901 – 29 October 2004); she married Prince Henry, Duke of Gloucester, on 6 November 1935, had two sons (Prince William of Gloucester and Prince Richard, Duke of Gloucester).
- Lady Mary Theresa Montagu Douglas Scott (4 March 1904 – 1 June 1984); she married David Cecil, 6th Marquess of Exeter, on 10 January 1929 and they were divorced in 1946), had four children. They were also the maternal grandparents of Henry Vane, 12th Baron Barnard.
- Lady Angela Christine Rose Montagu Douglas Scott (26 December 1906 – 28 September 2000); she married Vice-Admiral Sir Peter Dawnay on 28 April 1936, had two children.
- Lord George Francis John Montagu Douglas Scott (8 July 1911 – 8 June 1999); he married Mary Bishop on 16 December 1938, had three children, including Charmian Rachel Montagu Douglas Scott

=== Death ===
Buccleuch died from cancer at Bowhill House, Selkirkshire, Borders, Scotland, on 19 October 1935, aged 71, less than a month before his daughter Alice married Prince Henry, the third son of King George V and Queen Mary. The marriage was to take place at Westminster Abbey, but given the circumstances coupled with the king’s ill health, the event was scaled back and the venue changed to Buckingham Palace.

Buccleuch was buried on 22 October in the family crypt of the Buccleuch Memorial Chapel in St. Mary's Episcopal Church, Dalkeith, Midlothian. The church is located on Dalkeith's High Street, at the entrance to Dalkeith Country Park.

Buccleuch was succeeded by his son Walter.

== Titles, honours and awards ==
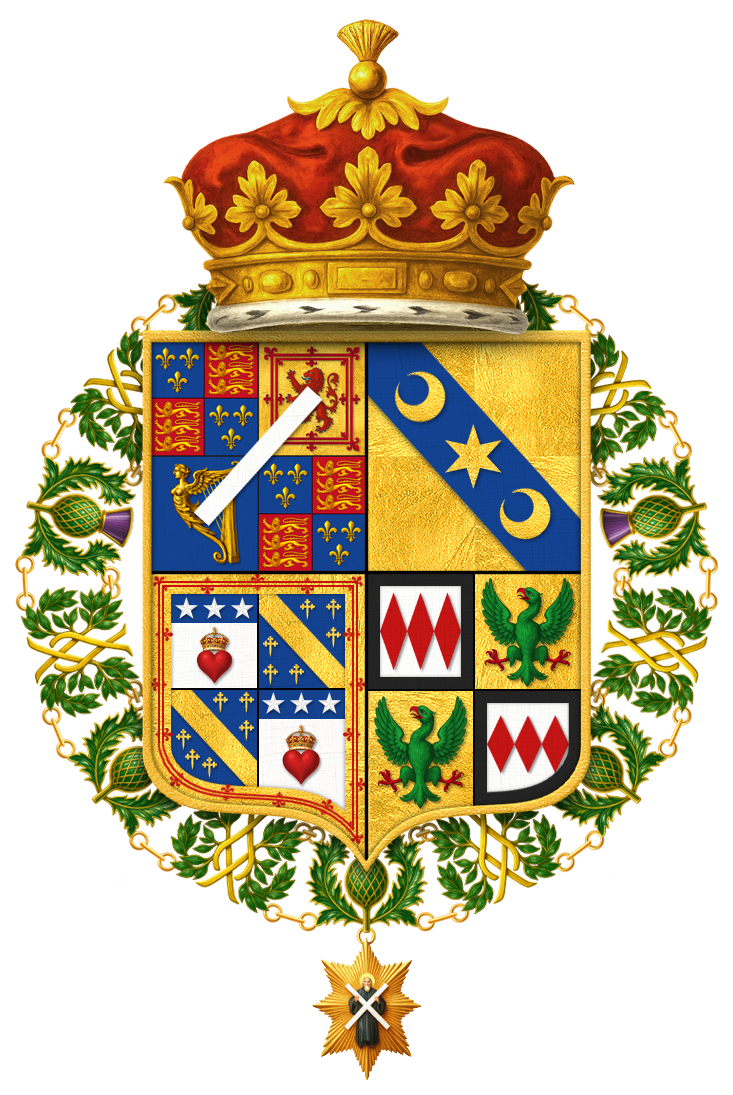
Shield of arms of John Charles Montagu Douglas Scott, 7th Duke of Buccleuch and 9th Duke of Queensberry

- 18 September 1886 – 5 November 1914: John Charles Montagu Douglas Scott, Earl of Dalkeith
- 5 November 1914: His Grace, Sir John Charles Montagu Douglas Scott, 7th Duke of Buccleuch & 9th Duke of Queensberry
- 1926: Lord Clerk Register
- 17 July 1929: Captain General of the Royal Company of Archers
- 1917: Knight, Order of the Thistle (KT)
- 1934: Knight Grand Cross, Royal Victorian Order (GCVO)
- 1929: Honorary Colonel, 78th (Lowland) Field Brigade, Royal Artillery

Parliament of the United Kingdom
| Preceded by Mark Napier | Member of Parliament for Roxburghshire; 1895 – 1906 | Succeeded by Sir John Jardine |
Political offices
| Preceded by The Duke of Montrose | Lord Clerk Register; 1926 – 1935 | Succeeded by The Earl of Mar |
Honorary titles
| Preceded by The Duke of Buccleuch | Lord Lieutenant of Dumfries; 1915 – 1935 | Succeeded by Francis John Carruthers |
Peerage of Scotland
| Preceded by William Henry Walter Montagu Douglas Scott | Duke of Buccleuch; 2nd creation 1914 – 1935 | Succeeded by Walter John Montagu Douglas Scott |
| Preceded by William Henry Walter Montagu Douglas Scott | Duke of Queensberry; 1914 – 1935 | Succeeded by Walter John Montagu Douglas Scott |
