= William Montagu-Douglas-Scott, 6th Duke of Buccleuch =

Scottish politician and peer (1831–1914)

His Grace The Duke of Buccleuch and Queensberry KG PC JP DL
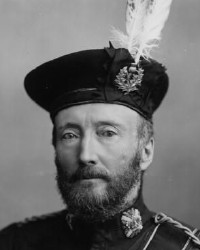

Member of Parliament for Midlothian
- In office 1874–1880
- Preceded by: Sir Alexander Ramsay-Gibson-Maitland
- Succeeded by: William Ewart Gladstone
- In office 1853–1868
- Preceded by: Sir John Hope
- Succeeded by: Sir Alexander Ramsay-Gibson-Maitland

Personal details
- Born: 9 September 1831 Montagu House, Whitehall, Westminster, England
- Died: 5 November 1914 (aged 83) Montagu House, Whitehall, Westminster, England
- Spouse: Lady Louisa Hamilton (m. 1859; died 1912)
- Children: Walter Montagu Douglas Scott, Earl of Dalkeith; John Montagu Douglas Scott, 7th Duke of Buccleuch; Lord George Montagu Douglas Scott; Lord Henry Montagu Douglas Scott; Lord Herbert Montagu Douglas Scott; Katherine Brand, Viscountess Hampden; Lady Constance Cairns; Lord Francis Montagu Douglas Scott
- Parents: Walter Montagu Douglas Scott, 5th Duke of Buccleuch; Lady Charlotte Thynne

William Henry Walter Montagu-Douglas-Scott, 6th Duke of Buccleuch and 8th Duke of Queensberry (9 September 1831 – 5 November 1914) was a Scottish Member of Parliament and peer. He was the paternal grandfather of Princess Alice, Duchess of Gloucester.

== Early life ==
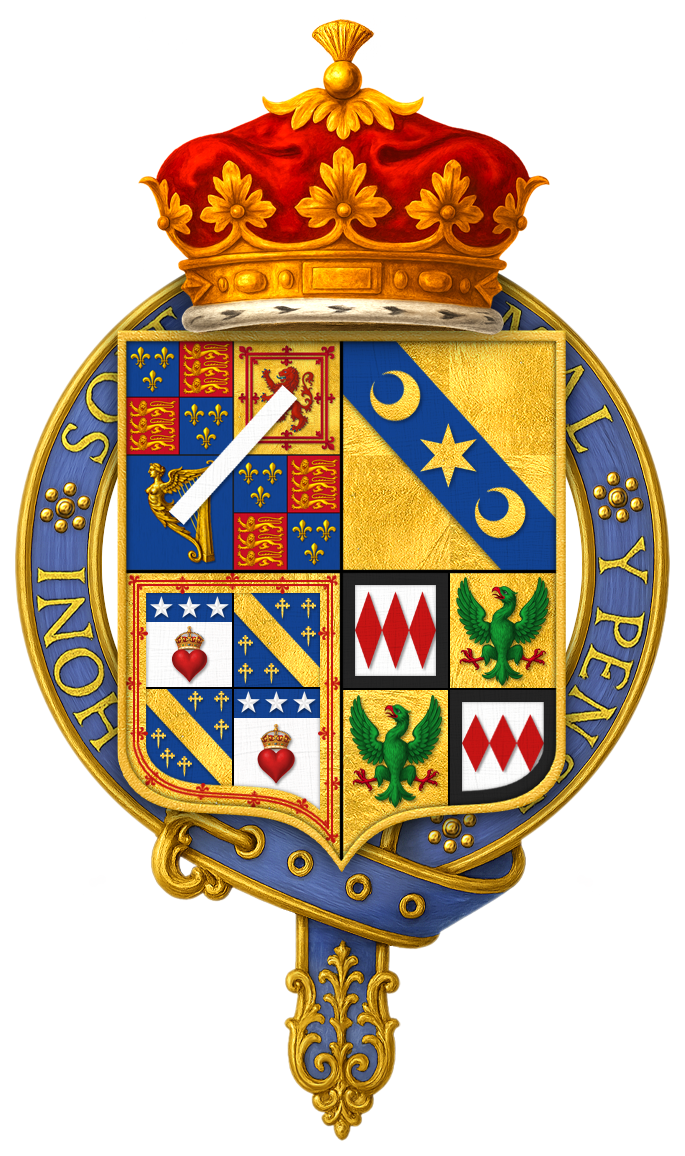
Garter encircled arms of William Montagu Douglas Scott, 6th Duke of Buccleuch, KG, as displayed on his Order of the Garter stall plate in St. George's Chapel.

Born at Montagu House, Whitehall, Westminster, London, into a family of seven children, William Henry Walter Montagu-Douglas-Scott was the eldest son of Walter Montagu-Douglas-Scott, 5th Duke of Buccleuch & 7th Duke of Queensberry and Lady Charlotte Anne Thynne, daughter of Thomas Thynne, 2nd Marquess of Bath, and the Hon. Isabella Elizabeth Byng. William was a direct male-line descendant of Charles II through James Scott, 1st Duke of Monmouth.

He was educated at Eton College and at Christ Church, Oxford.

== Career ==
The 32 blank pages of the pamphlet have been digitised by the LSE Library.

He sat as Conservative Member of Parliament for Midlothian from 1853–1868 and from 1874–1880. He was also lieutenant colonel of the Midlothian Yeomanry from 1872, as well as serving as Justice of the Peace (JP) for Selkirkshire, Deputy Lieutenant (DL) of Selkirkshire, and Deputy Lieutenant (DL) of Roxburghshire.

The Political Achievements of the Earl of Dalkeith was a political pamphlet that was published and circulated in Edinburgh during the 1880 United Kingdom general election. It was well presented but inside the neatly printed cover, there were just thirty-two blank pages, making it an early empty book. The publication was thought to be an effective attack on William Montagu-Douglas-Scott, 6th Duke of Buccleuch, who lost the seat to William Ewart Gladstone by 211 votes.

== Personal life ==
On 22 November 1859, he married Lady Louisa Jane Hamilton in London, England. She was the third daughter of James Hamilton, 1st Duke of Abercorn, and Lady Louisa Jane Russell (daughter of John Russell, 6th Duke of Bedford). As heir apparent to his father's title, William was already "Earl of Dalkeith" by courtesy, and thus his new bride was immediately styled "Countess of Dalkeith". They had eight children:

- Walter Henry Montagu Douglas Scott, Earl of Dalkeith (1861–1886)
- John Charles Montagu Douglas Scott, 7th Duke of Buccleuch (1864–1935), who was the father of Princess Alice, Duchess of Gloucester.
- Lord George William Montagu Douglas Scott (1866–1947), who married Lady Elizabeth Emily Manners (daughter of John Manners, 7th Duke of Rutland and Janetta Hughan) on 30 April 1903 and had issue.
- Lord Henry Francis Montagu Douglas Scott (1868–1945).
- Lord Herbert Andrew Montagu Douglas Scott (1872–1944), who married Marie Josephine Edwards on 26 April 1905, and had issue, maternal great-grandfather of Sarah Ferguson.
- Lady Katharine Mary Montagu Douglas Scott (1875–1951), who married Thomas Brand, 3rd Viscount Hampden and had issue, including Thomas Brand, 4th Viscount Hampden, and David Brand, 5th Viscount Hampden.
- Lady Constance Anne Montagu Douglas Scott (1877–1970), who married The Hon. Douglas Halyburton Cairns, son of Hugh Cairns, 1st Earl Cairns, and Mary Harriet McNeill, on 21 January 1908 and had issue.
- Lord Francis George Montagu Douglas Scott (1879–1952), who married Lady Eileen Nina Evelyn Sibell Elliot-Murray-Kynynmound, daughter of Gilbert Elliot-Murray-Kynynmound, 4th Earl of Minto, and Lady Mary Caroline Grey, on 11 February 1915 and had issue.

The Duke died at Montagu House, Whitehall, London, England, on 5 November 1914 at the age of 83. He had survived his wife, Lady Louisa Jane, by little more than two years. He was survived by seven of his eight children and their families. He was the maternal great-grandfather of Prince William of Gloucester and Prince Richard, Duke of Gloucester, and the great-great-grandfather of Sarah Ferguson.

He was buried on 10 November in the family crypt of the Buccleuch Memorial Chapel in St. Mary's Episcopal Church, Dalkeith, Midlothian. The church is located on Dalkeith's High Street, at the entrance to Dalkeith Country Park.

== Titles, honours and awards ==
- 9 September 1831 – 15 April 1884: William Henry Walter Montagu Douglas Scott, Earl of Dalkeith
- 5 August 1875: Invested as Knight of the Thistle (KT)
- 16 April 1884: 6th Duke of Buccleuch & 8th Duke of Queensberry
- 7 December 1897: Invested as Knight Companion of the Most Noble Order of the Garter
- 7 December 1897: Resigned as Knight of the Thistle
- 1900: Captain General of the Royal Company of Archers
- 10 December 1901: Sworn of the Privy Council

Parliament of the United Kingdom
| Preceded by Sir John Hope | Member of Parliament for Midlothian; 1853 – 1868 | Succeeded by Sir Alexander Ramsay-Gibson-Maitland |
| Preceded by Sir Alexander Ramsay-Gibson-Maitland | Member of Parliament for Midlothian; 1874 – 1880 | Succeeded by William Ewart Gladstone |
Honorary titles
| Preceded by The Marquess of Queensberry | Lord Lieutenant of Dumfries; 1858–1914 | Succeeded by The Duke of Buccleuch |
Peerage of Scotland
| Preceded by Walter Francis Montagu Douglas Scott | Duke of Buccleuch; 2nd creation 1884 – 1914 | Succeeded by John Charles Montagu Douglas Scott |
| Preceded by Walter Francis Montagu Douglas Scott | Duke of Queensberry; 1884 – 1914 | Succeeded by John Charles Montagu Douglas Scott |
