= Princess Alice, Duchess of Gloucester =

Member of the British royal family (1901–2004)

Princess Alice
- Duchess of Gloucester (more)
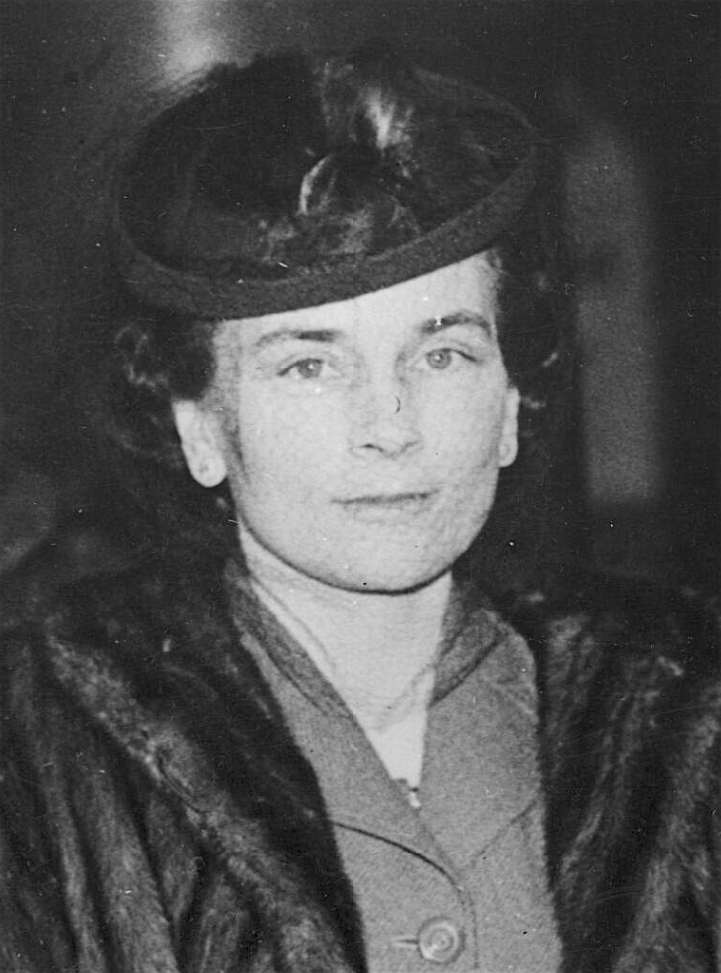
- Alice in 1945
- Born: Lady Alice Christabel Montagu Douglas Scott; 25 December 1901; Montagu House, London, England
- Died: 29 October 2004 (aged 102); Kensington Palace, London, England
- Burial: 5 November 2004; Royal Burial Ground, Frogmore, Windsor, Berkshire, England
- Spouse: Prince Henry, Duke of Gloucester (m. 1935; died 1974)
- Issue: Prince William of Gloucester; Prince Richard, Duke of Gloucester
- Noble family: Montagu Douglas Scott
- Father: John Montagu Douglas Scott, 7th Duke of Buccleuch
- Mother: Lady Margaret Bridgeman

Spouse of the governor-general of Australia
- In office 30 January 1945 – 11 March 1947
- Monarch: George VI
- Governor General: Prince Henry, Duke of Gloucester
- Preceded by: The Countess of Gowrie
- Succeeded by: Mary, Lady McKell

Princess Alice, Duchess of Gloucester (born Lady Alice Christabel Montagu Douglas Scott; 25 December 1901 – 29 October 2004), was a member of the British royal family. She was the wife of Prince Henry, Duke of Gloucester, the third son of King George V and Queen Mary. They had two sons, Prince William of Gloucester and Prince Richard, Duke of Gloucester.

Alice was the daughter of the 7th Duke of Buccleuch, Scotland's largest landowner. Through her marriage she became a princess of the United Kingdom and a sister-in-law of Edward VIII and George VI, and therefore an aunt by marriage of Elizabeth II. She travelled widely throughout her life. At her death aged 102, she was the longest-lived member of the British royal family.

== Early life ==
Lady Alice Christabel Montagu-Douglas-Scott was born on 25 December 1901 at Montagu House, Whitehall, London, the third daughter and fifth child of John Montagu-Douglas-Scott, Earl of Dalkeith (later Duke of Buccleuch and Queensberry), and his wife, the former Lady Margaret Alice "Molly" Bridgeman, daughter of the 4th Earl of Bradford. Her brothers Walter and William, and her nephew John, all served as Conservative MPs. Through her first cousin Marian Louisa, Lady Elmhirst, she was also connected to Sarah Ferguson, former wife of Alice's great-nephew Andrew Mountbatten-Windsor.

Alice was a descendant, in an unbroken male line, of Charles II through his eldest but illegitimate son, James Scott, 1st Duke of Monmouth, a political figure in the years preceding the Glorious Revolution. Her birth on Christmas Day accounted for her middle name, Christabel.

She spent much of her childhood moving between the family's principal houses: Boughton House in Northamptonshire, Drumlanrig Castle in Dumfries and Galloway, and Bowhill in the Scottish Borders. Eildon Hall, near Melrose, served as the family's main base.

In her memoirs, Alice described a near‑drowning at the age of 14. While swimming in the Solway Firth she was caught in a current, later recalling:

The next instant my feet touched rocks. I was able to stand up and get my breath back. I had been carried quite a way down the coast—some houses had come and gone on my left—but the rocks proved to be a reef and I was able to scramble through them back to shallow water without further mishap.... In return for my life I had promised to dedicate it to some useful purpose; but there never seemed to be anything that required my help or that I was any use at. So when, through a series of unforeseen circumstances, I one day found myself allotted a life of public duty in the service of my country, a very secret pledge was honoured.

Alice attended the independent St James's School for Girls in West Malvern, Worcestershire, and later travelled to France, Kenya, and India. After her schooling in West Malvern, she spent a year in Paris "before returning home to be presented at Court in 1920". She enjoyed skiing, horse riding, and hunting, and was also an accomplished watercolourist. One of her paintings, made near Archers Post in Kenya, is now part of the Royal Collection.

During her extended stay in Kenya, from about 1929–1931, she lived in an area associated with the so‑called Happy Valley set and encountered many of its well‑known personalities, including Evelyn Waugh, who was then travelling in Africa.

== Marriage ==
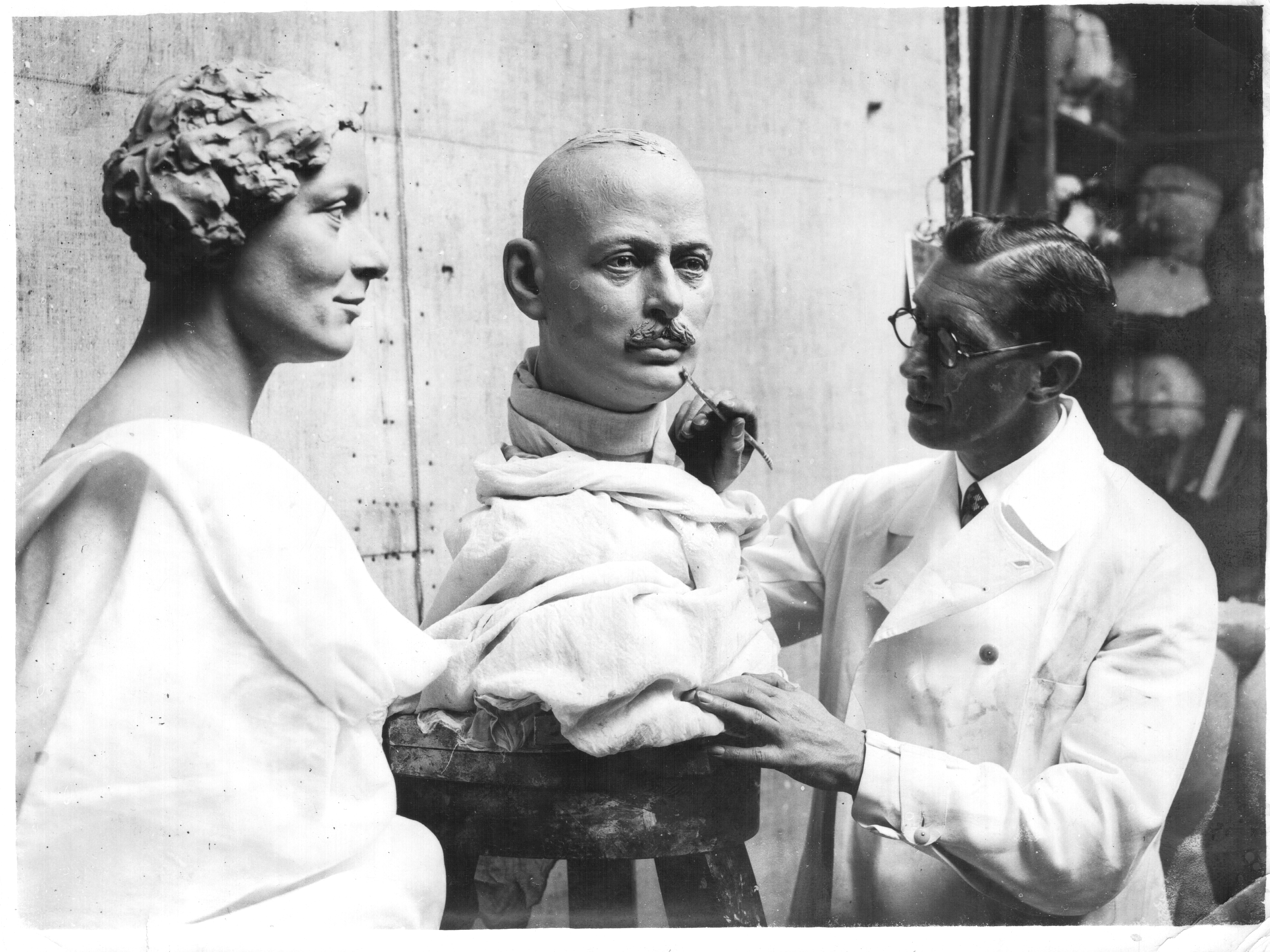
Bernard Tussaud finishes the wax figure of Lady Alice Montagu-Douglas-Scott and the Duke of Gloucester, 16 October 1935

In 1935, Alice returned to the United Kingdom after learning that her father's health had been deteriorating. In August that year she became engaged to Prince Henry, Duke of Gloucester. They were married on 6 November in a private ceremony in the Private Chapel at Buckingham Palace. A large wedding at Westminster Abbey had originally been planned, but following the death of the Duke of Buccleuch from cancer on 19 October, and in view of the King's own declining health, the event was scaled down to a more intimate setting.

Although the day was cold and wet, an estimated crowd of more than one million people lined the route from the Palace to the railway station to see the couple depart on their honeymoon. From this period she was often referred to as the "Winter Princess".

=== Life in the royal family ===
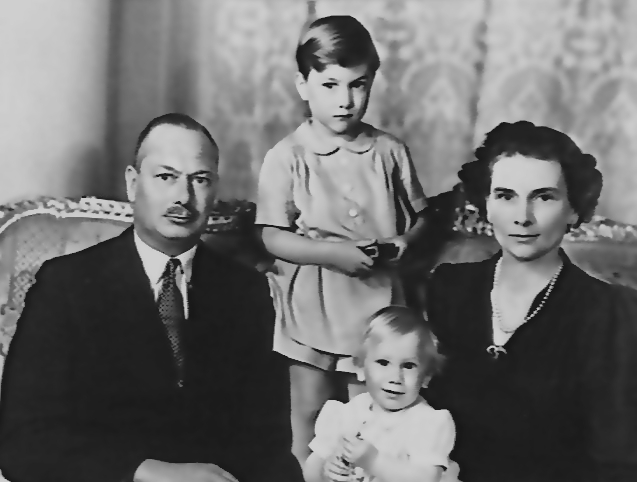
The Duke and Duchess of Gloucester with their two sons William (standing) and Richard in Canberra

Initially Alice and Henry lived at the Royal Pavilion in Aldershot, where he was taking the Army staff course. Following the abdication of Edward VIII in December 1936, Henry, who was the first adult in the line of succession and therefore the designated regent in case of an early accession of his niece Princess Elizabeth, left the army to take on more public duties.

Alice suffered two miscarriages, before giving birth to two sons:

- Prince William of Gloucester (18 December 1941 – 28 August 1972)
- Prince Richard, Duke of Gloucester (born 26 August 1944). He married a Danish commoner, Birgitte van Deurs Henriksen, on 8 July 1972. The couple later had three children.

Alice and Henry travelled extensively, undertaking various engagements. Alice's public appearances included launching HMS Gloucester on 19 October 1937. During World War II, she worked with the Red Cross and the Order of St John. She became commandant of the Women's Auxiliary Air Force (WAAF) in 1939 on appointment to the rank of Senior controller, changed to Air commandant on 12 March 1940, and served in this position alongside Jane Trefusis Forbes as director of the WAAF. Alice was appointed Air chief commandant on 4 March 1943. She continued to serve as commandant of the WAAF, alongside Mary Welsh as director of the WAAF, until August 1944. When the WAAF became the Women's Royal Air Force (WRAF) in 1949, she was appointed an Air chief commandant (equivalent to Air vice-marshal) in the new service on 1 February 1949. Alice was promoted to Air marshal on 1 September 1968, and to air chief marshal in the Royal Air Force on 23 February 1990. She also served as deputy to Queen Elizabeth, the consort of George VI, as Commandant-in-Chief of the Nursing Corps.

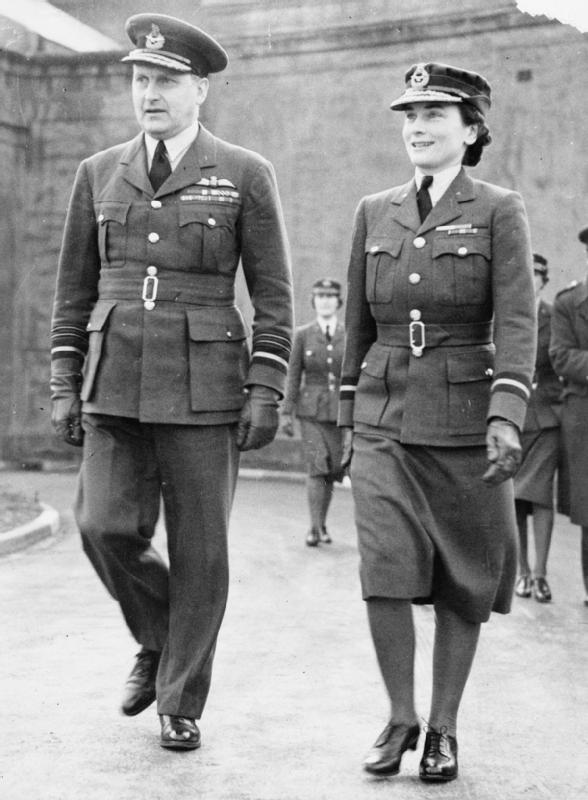
The Duchess of Gloucester in her WAAF uniform, with Air Marshal W. Sholto Douglas

From 1945 to 1947, Alice and Henry lived in Canberra, where he was serving as Governor-General of Australia. He had visited Australia a number of times. In 1969, they were invited to their niece Moyra Dawnay's wedding to Timothy de Zoete, grandson of cricketer Herman de Zoete.

Alice served as Colonel-in-Chief or deputy Colonel-in-Chief of a dozen regiments in the British Army, including the King's Own Scottish Borderers, the Northamptonshire Regiment, the 2nd East Anglian Regiment (Duchess of Gloucester's Own Royal Lincolnshire and Northamptonshire), the Royal Anglian Regiment, the Royal Hussars, and the Royal Irish Rangers (27th Inniskilling); also, the Royal Corps of Transport. She was Patron of the Girls' Day School Trust and from 1940 until her death Patron of Queen Margaret College in Edinburgh.

In 1965, while returning from Winston Churchill's funeral in their vehicle, Henry suffered a stroke, which resulted in a car crash, with him being thrown out of the car and Alice "suffering facial injuries". On the occasion she wrote: "I was sitting beside him to grab the wheel or put my foot on the brake if he fell asleep and lost control, but on that occasion I must have dozed off myself. Apparently the Rolls swerved off the road (and) ended upside down in a field of cabbages. Prince Henry had luckily been thrown through the open door...into (stinging) nettles and brambles".

In 1972, Alice and Henry's elder son, William, was killed in a plane crash while participating in an amateur air show race. Her husband was in such poor health at the time of their son's death that she hesitated whether to tell him, later admitting in her memoirs that she did not but that he may have learned of William's death from television coverage. Henry died on 10 June 1974, aged 74.

==== Residences ====
In 1937 the couple received a London grace and favour residence at York House, St James's Palace, which had been the London home of Henry's older brother Edward VIII prior to his accession to the throne. In 1938, Alice and Henry purchased Barnwell Manor in Northamptonshire. The purchase price for the Barnwell Estate (which included four tenanted farms) was £37,500; in her memoirs, Alice describes this amount as "the greater part of the money left to Prince Henry by the King." However, records of financial negotiations resulting from the abdication of Edward VIII state that Henry received a legacy of £750,000 from his father's private fortune. Prior to 1948, the couple also had use of Nottingham Cottage.

Following the death of her sister-in-law Princess Marina, Duchess of Kent in 1968, it was announced in November 1969 that Alice and Henry would relocate from their home at York House, St James's Palace to Apartment 1, Kensington Palace. Justification for their relocation was provided by a Palace spokesperson, who was quoted in contemporary newspapers as stating "York House is a large and unwieldy house for present-day use. The apartment at Kensington Palace is much more compact, modernised and easier to run." Alice and Henry's recently married younger son, Richard, also used the Apartment from 1972. Apartment 1, Kensington Palace would remain Alice's London home for the final thirty-five years of her life.

== Later life ==
In 1975, Alice was the first woman to be appointed a Dame Grand Cross of the Order of the Bath. In 1981, she first published her memoirs under the title The Memoirs of Princess Alice, Duchess of Gloucester. In 1991, she released a revised edition as Memories of Ninety Years.

In 1994, after Richard and Birgitte had to give up Barnwell Manor for financial reasons, Alice moved from Barnwell to Kensington Palace, where she lived with them. She officially retired from public duties at the age of 98. In 1999, Richard issued a press release announcing that due to physical frailty, his mother would no longer carry out public engagements outside the environs of Kensington Palace. In July 2000, he said in another statement that his mother had become "increasingly forgetful".

In December 2001, the royal family held a ceremony to acknowledge Alice's 100th birthday. This was her last public appearance, as well as the last public appearance of Princess Margaret, the Queen's younger sister, who died on 9 February 2002. On the death of Queen Elizabeth the Queen Mother aged 101 in March 2002, Alice became the oldest living member of the British royal family. On 21 August 2003, Alice surpassed the Queen Mother's record as the oldest person in the history of the British royal family by reaching the age of 101 years and 238 days. On 20 September 2003, at the age of 101 years and 269 days, she was certified by Guinness World Records as the world's longest-lived royal of all time, surpassing Leonilla, Princess of Sayn-Wittgenstein-Sayn.

== Death ==
Alice died in her sleep from heart failure at Kensington Palace on 29 October 2004, aged 102 years and 309 days. Following her death, the Union Jack flew at half-mast at Buckingham Palace. Her funeral was held on 5 November 2004 at St George's Chapel, Windsor, and she was interred next to her husband, Henry, and her elder son, William, in the Royal Burial Ground at Frogmore. The funeral was attended by Elizabeth II and other members of the British royal family. A memorial service was held at St Clement Danes on 2 February 2005, attended by her son, Richard, and his family and representatives of organisations Alice was involved in; the service was co-ordinated by the Royal Air Force in respect of Alice's role as Commandant-in-Chief WRAF.

Contrary to royal tradition, Alice's will was not sealed after her death. Her estate was valued at £569,849 (equivalent to £1,028,463 in 2025).

== Legacy ==
Hugo Vickers called Alice "a very private person who was not widely known to the general public" despite being the third-highest-ranking lady in the royal family at the time of her marriage.

It was well known she disliked large parties. Peter Townsend said of her: "She possessed classic, serene good looks and sincerity shone from her mild face. But she was painfully shy, so that conversation with her was sometimes halting and unrewarding, for you felt that she had so much more to say, but could not bring herself to say it." Alice herself wrote in her autobiography: "I was very shy and rather plump, ... I made a miserable debut at a dance at Windsor for Princess Mary's birthday, uncomfortably squeezed into a white satin frock."

Although generally a woman of few and soft-spoken words, Alice was known for her dry humour. Soon after her marriage, when the couple moved to York House, they were warned that the drawing-room floor would not stand the weight of more than twenty people. "So we made a party list," she recalled many years later, "of the twenty-one people whom we disliked most."

The Queen Mother said of Alice after her son's death in an air crash in 1972: "The tragic accident was a great shock to all the family, but I feel desperately for his dear little mother. She has the courage of a lion, and has suffered so many cruel blows in the past few years...". Alice herself later admitted that following her son's death "I was completely stunned and have never quite been the same since".

== In popular culture ==
Alice was portrayed by Penny Downie in the third season of the Netflix series The Crown.

== Titles, styles, honours and arms ==
Coat of arms of Princess Alice, Duchess of Gloucester

=== Titles and styles ===
- 25 December 1901 – 5 November 1935: Lady Alice Montagu-Douglas-Scott
- 6 November 1935 – 10 June 1974: Her Royal Highness The Duchess of Gloucester
- 10 June 1974 – 29 October 2004: Her Royal Highness Princess Alice, Duchess of Gloucester

On 10 June 1974, Henry died, and was succeeded as Duke of Gloucester by their second son, Richard. As a widow, she requested permission from her niece Queen Elizabeth II to use the title and style HRH Princess Alice, Duchess of Gloucester, instead of adopting HRH The Dowager Duchess of Gloucester or HRH Princess Henry. Queen Elizabeth II allowed her aunt to adopt this title, in part to avoid confusion with her daughter-in-law, the new Duchess of Gloucester (formerly Birgitte van Deurs Henriksen).

=== Honours ===
==== British honours ====
- GCStJ: Dame Grand Cross of the Order of St. John, 22 December 1936
- CI: Companion of the Crown of India, 9 June 1937
- GBE: Dame Grand Cross of the Order of the British Empire, 11 May 1937
- GCVO: Dame Grand Cross of the Royal Victorian Order, 1 January 1948
- GCB: Dame Grand Cross of the Order of the Bath, 2 April 1975
- Royal Family Order of George V, 1935
- Royal Family Order of George VI, 1937
- Royal Family Order of Elizabeth II, 1952

==== Military appointments ====
UK

- Colonel-in-Chief, the King's Own Scottish Borderers
- Colonel-in-Chief, the Northamptonshire Regiment
- Colonel-in-Chief, the 2nd East Anglian Regiment (Duchess of Gloucester's Own Royal Lincolnshire and Northamptonshire)
- Colonel-in-Chief, the Royal Hussars (until 1992)
- Colonel-in-Chief, the Royal Irish Rangers (27th Inniskilling) (until 1989)
- Colonel-in-Chief, the Royal Corps of Transport
- Deputy Colonel-in-Chief, the Royal Anglian Regiment
- Deputy Colonel-in-Chief, the King's Royal Hussars
- Deputy Commandant-in-Chief, the Nursing Corps
- Lady Sponsor, HMS Gloucester

Commonwealth

- Colonel-in-Chief, Australian Women's Army Service
- Colonel-in-Chief, Royal Australian Corps of Transport
- Colonel-in-Chief, Royal New Zealand Army Service Corps (until 1979)
- Colonel-in-Chief, Royal New Zealand Corps of Transport
- Honorary Colonel, Australian Army Nursing Service Reserve (until 1947)
- Commandant-in-Chief, Women's Royal Australian Naval Service (until 1947)
- Commandant-in-Chief, Women's Auxiliary Australian Air Force (until 1947)
- Commandant-in-Chief, Australian Women's Land Army

==== Military ranks ====
- 1939: Head and Senior Controller, the Women's Auxiliary Air Force (WAAF)
- 1940: Air Commandant, the Women's Auxiliary Air Force
- 1943: Air Chief Commandant, the Women's Auxiliary Air Force
- 1949–1994: Air Chief Commandant (equivalent to Air Vice-Marshal), the Women's Royal Air Force (WRAF)
  - 1994: Air Chief Commandant, Women, Royal Air Force
- 1968: Air Marshal, the Women's Royal Air Force
- 1990: Air Chief Marshal, the Royal Air Force

== Publications ==
- Princess Alice, Duchess of Gloucester, The Memoirs of Princess Alice, Duchess of Gloucester (London: Collins, 1983), ISBN 0-00-216646-1.
- Princess Alice, Duchess of Gloucester, Memories of Ninety Years (London: Collins & Brown Ltd, 1991), ISBN 1-85585-048-6.
