= Wedding of Prince Edward and Katharine Worsley =

1961 British royal wedding

- Date: 8 June 1961; 65 years ago
- Venue: York Minster
- Location: York, England
- Participants: Prince Edward, Duke of Kent; Katharine Worsley

The wedding of Prince Edward, Duke of Kent, and Katharine Worsley took place on Thursday, 8 June 1961, at York Minster in York, England. The Duke of Kent is the eldest son of Prince George, Duke of Kent, and Princess Marina of Greece and Denmark, while Katharine Worsley was the only daughter and fourth child of landowner Sir William Worsley, 4th Baronet.

The televised ceremony was a traditional Church of England wedding service. Eric Milner-White, Dean of York, presided at the service, and Michael Ramsey, Archbishop of York, conducted the marriage. Notable figures in attendance included many members of other royal families, members of the British government and members of the bride's and groom's families. After the ceremony, the couple returned to the bride's family home, Hovingham Hall, for the reception.

It was the first royal wedding held in York Minster since Edward III married Philippa of Hainault in 1328.

== Engagement ==
The Duke of Kent met Katherine Worsley, daughter of Sir William Worsley, 4th Baronet, while he was based at Catterick Garrison near the bride's family ancestral home, Hovingham Hall.

The engagement of the Duke of Kent to Katharine Worsley was announced by the groom's mother, Princess Marina, on 8 March 1961 at Kensington Palace. Marina reportedly disapproved of her son's choice for a bride and twice forbade the match before agreeing to the marriage in 1961. The Duke presented Worsley with an engagement ring made of an oval sapphire with round diamonds on either side. The public reception of the news was positive. The Duke was becoming only the second British prince since the reign of George III to marry an untitled lady.

On 9 March 1961, it was announced that the wedding was set for 8 June of that year at York Minster. The Queen gave her official consent to the match, as was then required by the Royal Marriages Act 1772, on 28 March 1961.

== Wedding ==
The Duke and Duchess of Kent's combined coat of arms

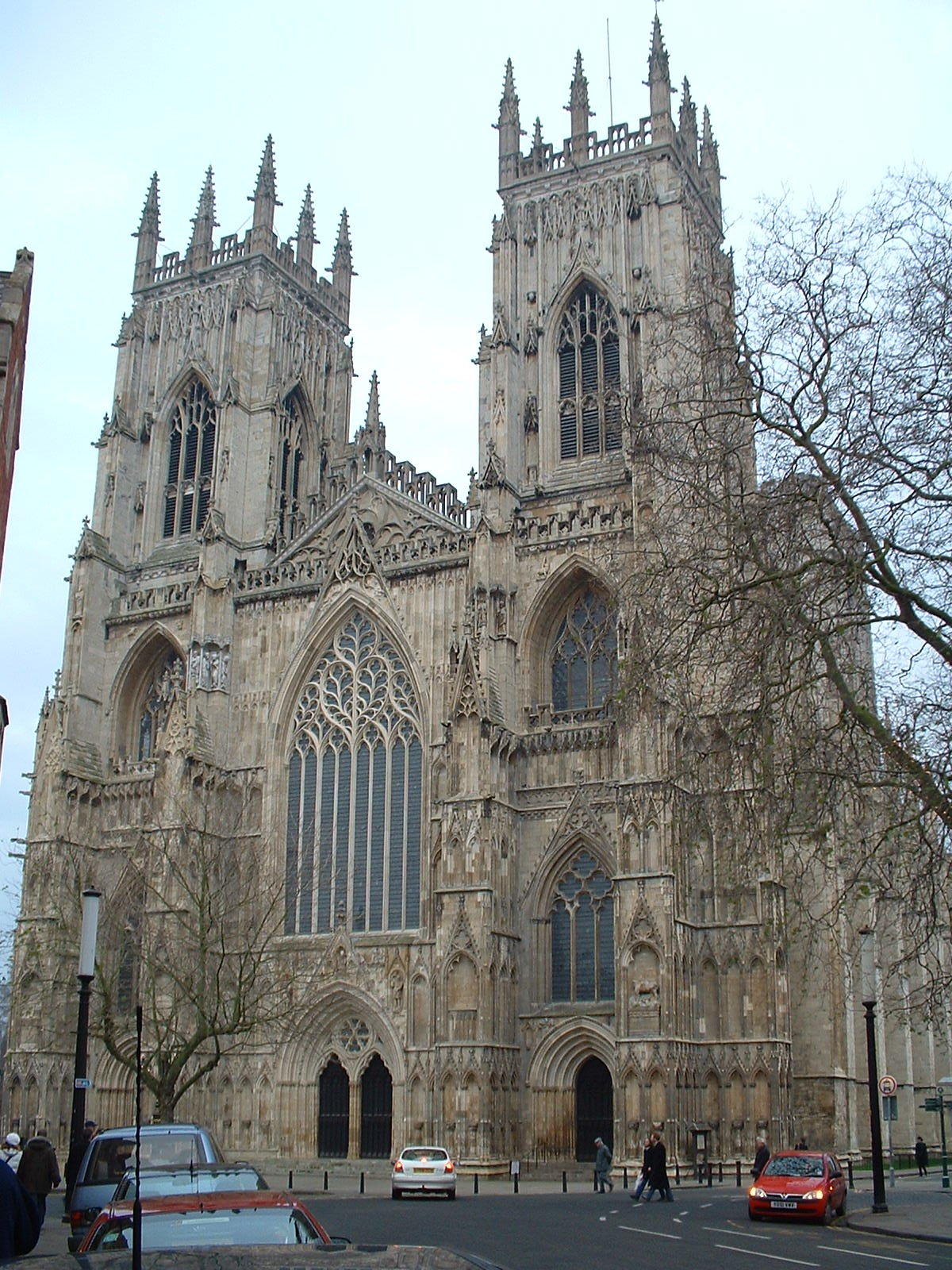
West façade of York Minster

External videos
- The Royal Wedding of Prince Edward & Katharine at York Minster (1961) (external video)

The wedding took place on Thursday, 8 June 1961, at York Minster, the "Westminster Abbey of the North." The service was mostly conducted by Eric Milner-White, Dean of York, with Michael Ramsey, Archbishop of York, who had recently been appointed Archbishop of Canterbury, solemnizing the marriage.

The groom arrived at the Minister with his supporter, his brother Prince Michael of Kent. Members of the British royal family and foreign royal families entered in a procession and took their seats opposite the bride's family in the lantern in front of the choir screen. The Queen and the Duke of Edinburgh, with the Prince of Wales, were the last to arrive before the bride. Katharine arrived and walked down the aisle with her father, Sir William Worsley.

=== Music ===
The bride walked down the aisle to the hymn "O Praise Ye the Lord! Sing Praise in the Height" to the tune Laudate Dominum by Sir Hubert Parry. The newlywed couple recessed to Widor's "Toccata" from Symphony for Organ No. 5.

=== Attire ===
The bride's wedding dress, designed by John Cavanagh on the recommendation of her future mother-in-law, was made of 237 yards of French-made diaphanous white silk gauze. It featured a tight bodice, stiff neckline, and a full skirt with a 15-foot double train. She anchored her white tulle veil with a diamond bandeau tiara which belonged to the bridegroom's late grandmother, Queen Mary. Both Worsley and Princess Marina were concerned that the dress appeared massive in Cavanagh's studio, he reassured them the scale would fit York Minster. There was also concern the dress was too heavy and would be awkward to manoeuvre. To overcome this, Worsley practiced walking, curtsying and kneeling in the dress with Cavanagh's help.

The Duke wore the uniform of his regiment, the Royal Scots Greys with the riband of the Royal Victorian Order.

=== Attendants ===
The bridegroom was supported by his brother, Prince Michael. The bride was attended by eight bridesmaids and three page boys:

- The Princess Anne, daughter of The Queen and The Duke of Edinburgh, thus a paternal first cousin once removed (maternal second cousin) of the groom
- The Hon. Jane Spencer, daughter of Viscount and Viscountess Althorp
- Sandra Butter, daughter of Major and Mrs David Butter
- Joanna FitzRoy, daughter of Lord and Lady Edward FitzRoy
- Willa Worsley, daughter of The Hon. Carolyn and Mr John Worsley, thus a niece of the bride
- Diana Worsley, daughter of Mr and Mrs Edward Worsley, thus a paternal first cousin of the bride
- Katherine Ashley-Cooper
- Emily Briggs
- William Worsley, son of Mr and Mrs Marcus Worsley, thus a nephew of the bride
- Edward Beckett, son of Lady Elizabeth and The Hon. Christopher Beckett
- Simon Hay, son of Lady Margaret and Sir Philip Hay

=== Guests ===
The groom's uncle and godfather, the Duke of Windsor, did not attend. At the wedding, Juan Carlos, Prince of Asturias, became better acquainted with Princess Sophia of Greece and Denmark. They would marry the following year and accede to the Spanish throne in 1975.

Notable guests in attendance included:

==== Relatives of the groom ====
- The Duchess of Kent, the groom's mother
  - Princess Alexandra of Kent, the groom's sister
  - Prince Michael of Kent, the groom's brother
- Queen Elizabeth the Queen Mother, the groom's paternal aunt by marriage
  - The Queen and the Duke of Edinburgh, the groom's paternal first cousin and maternal first cousin once removed
    - The Prince of Wales, the groom's paternal first cousin once removed
    - The Princess Anne, the groom's paternal first cousin once removed (bridesmaid)
  - The Princess Margaret and Mr Antony Armstrong-Jones, the groom's paternal first cousin and her husband
- The Princess Royal, the groom's paternal aunt
  - The Earl and Countess of Harewood, the groom's paternal first cousin and his wife
- The Duke and Duchess of Gloucester, the groom's paternal uncle and aunt
  - Prince William of Gloucester, the groom's paternal first cousin
- Lady Patricia and the Hon. Sir Alexander Ramsay, the groom's paternal first cousin twice removed and her husband
- Princess Alice, Countess of Athlone, the groom's first cousin twice removed and paternal great-aunt by marriage
- The Earl Mountbatten of Burma, the groom's second cousin once removed
  - The Lady and Lord Brabourne, the groom's third cousin and her husband
  - Lady Pamela and Mr David Hicks, the groom's third cousin and her husband

==== Relatives of the bride ====
- Sir William and Lady Worsley, the bride's parents
  - Mr and Mrs Marcus Worsley, the bride's brother and sister-in-law
    - Master William Worsley, the bride's nephew
  - Mr Oliver Worsley, the bride's brother
  - Mr John Worsley and the Hon. Carolyn Worsley, the bride's brother and sister-in-law
    - Miss Willa Worsley, the bride's niece

==== Other royal guests ====
===== Members of reigning royal houses =====
- The Crown Prince of Norway, the groom's paternal second cousin
- Princess Irene of the Netherlands, the groom's maternal half-third cousin
- Princess Margrethe of Denmark, the groom's paternal and maternal third cousin
- Prince and Princess Georg of Denmark, the groom's first cousin twice removed and his wife
- The Crown Prince of Greece, the groom's maternal second cousin
- Princess Sophia of Greece and Denmark, the groom's maternal second cousin
- Princess Eugénie, Duchess of Castel Duino, the groom's maternal first cousin once removed

===== Members of non-reigning royal houses =====
- Queen Victoria Eugenie of Spain, the groom's paternal first cousin twice removed
  - The Count of Barcelona, the groom's paternal second cousin once removed
    - The Prince of Asturias, the groom's paternal third cousin
    - The Duke of Bourbon and Burgundy, the groom's paternal third cousin
- Princess and Prince Paul of Yugoslavia the groom's maternal aunt and uncle
  - Prince and Princess Alexander of Yugoslavia, the groom's maternal first cousin and his wife
- The Princess of Hohenlohe-Langenburg, the groom's maternal first cousin once removed

==== Other notable guests ====
- Mr and Mrs Douglas Fairbanks Jr.
- Mr Noël Coward

== Aftermath ==
=== Reception and honeymoon ===
The reception was held at Hovingham Hall. The couple honeymooned at Birkhall on the Balmoral Castle estate.

=== Later life ===
Before the Duchess died in 2025, the Duke and Duchess of Kent were the longest presently married couple in the royal family. They have three children: George (born 1962), Helen (born 1964) and Nicholas (born 1970); and ten grandchildren. The Duchess had a spontaneous abortion in 1975 owing to rubella, and also gave birth to a stillborn son, Patrick, in 1977. She converted to Roman Catholicism in 1994, but the Duke retained his place in the line of succession because her conversion had taken place after their marriage.
