= William Worsley =

William Worsley may refer to:

- Sir William Worsley, 4th Baronet (1890–1973), English landowner and amateur first-class cricketer, father of Katharine, Duchess of Kent
- Sir William Worsley, 6th Baronet (born 1956), British forester, farmer and businessman, grandson of the 4th Baronet

== See also ==
- Willie Worsley (born 1945), American professional basketball player
