= Seker =

Seker may refer to:

- Sokar, a falcon god in Egyptian mythology
- Şeker, a Turkish name

== See also ==
- Şəkər (disambiguation)
