= Sekers =

Sekers is a surname. Notable people with the surname include:

- David Sekers (born 1943), British historian, son of Nicholas
- Nicholas Sekers (1910–1972), British industrialist
  - Sekers Building

== See also ==
- Ekers
- Şeker
