= Duchess of Kent =

Royal title

- First holder: Jemima Grey
- Last holder: Katharine Worsley
- Status: Vacant

Duchess of Kent is the principal title used by the wife of the Duke of Kent. There have been four titles referring to Kent since the 18th century. The most recent duchess was Katharine, the wife of Prince Edward. He inherited the dukedom on 25 August 1942 upon the death of his father, Prince George, the fourth son of George V.

== History ==
Henry Grey, 12th Earl of Kent since 1702 (of the eighth creation in the peerage of England) was raised to the peerage of Great Britain in 1706 under Queen Anne as Marquess of Kent, Earl of Harold and Viscount Goderich, then as Duke of Kent in 1710. In 1694, he had married Jemima Crew, who became Countess, Marchioness and then Duchess of Kent in 1702, 1706 and 1710 respectively. She died in 1728. In 1729, he married Sophia Bentinck, who died exactly a year after he did. The dukedom, marquessate and earldom of Kent all became extinct, as the duke had survived all of his sons and had no male collateral heirs. However, two subsidiary titles (the barony of Lucas of Crudwell and the marquessate of Grey) passed to his granddaughter, Jemima Yorke.

The Prince Edward Augustus was created Duke of Kent and Strathearn in the peerage of Great Britain by his father, George III, in 1799. In 1818, he married Princess Victoria of Saxe-Coburg-Saalfeld, the daughter of Duke Francis and former regent of the Principality of Leiningen. They had one daughter, Princess Alexandrina Victoria, in 1819. The duke died with no male heir in 1820, while the duchess died in 1861. She never married again, but there were rumours (unproven) of an affair with John Conroy.

Grand Duchess Maria Alexandrovna of Russia became Countess of Kent in 1874 on her marriage to The Prince Alfred Ernest Albert, who had received the earldom of Kent in the peerage of the United Kingdom from his mother eight years earlier. The couple were more commonly known by their higher titles of Duke and Duchess of Edinburgh, than as Duke and Duchess of Saxe-Coburg and Gotha. The duke died in 1900, and the duchess in 1920. They had survived their only son, Alfred, in 1899.

The Prince George Edward Alexander Edmund was created Duke of Kent by his father George V in 1934, some weeks in advance of his wedding to Princess Marina of Greece and Denmark. She was a first cousin of the future royal consort Prince Philip, Duke of Edinburgh. George died in 1942, leaving his peerage titles to his six-year-old son, Prince Edward. Marina continued to be styled "The Duchess of Kent" until Edward's wedding, and was then styled "Princess Marina, Duchess of Kent" until her own death in 1968.

Katharine Worsley married Prince Edward in 1961 and remained Duchess of Kent until her death in 2025.

== List of titleholders ==
=== Duchesses of Kent (Great Britain, 1710–1740) ===
Subsidiary titles: Countess of Harold, Viscountess Goderich, Baroness Lucas of Crudwell.

Duchess	Portrait	Birth	Marriage(s)	Death
Jemima Crew; Crew family 1710–1728	Jemima	1675 – daughter of Thomas Crew and Anne Armine	1694; Henry Grey, 12th Earl of Kent; 6 children	2 July 1728 aged 52 or 53
Sophia Bentinck; Bentinck family 1729–1740		4 April 1701 – daughter of William Bentinck, 1st Earl of Portland, and Jane Martha Temple	1729; Henry Grey, 1st Duke of Kent; 2 children	5 June 1741 aged 40

=== Duchess of Kent and Strathearn (Great Britain, 1818–1820) ===
Subsidiary titles: Countess of Dublin (Ireland).

Duchess	Portrait	Birth	Marriage(s)	Death
Princess Victoria of Saxe-Coburg-Saalfeld; House of Saxe-Coburg-Saalfeld; 1818–1820	Princess Victoria	17 August 1786; Coburg – daughter of Francis, Duke of Saxe-Coburg-Saalfeld and Countess Augusta of Reuss-Ebersdorf	29 May 1818; Prince Edward, Duke of Kent and Strathearn; 1 daughter	16 March 1861 aged 74

=== Countess of Kent (United Kingdom, 1874–1900) ===
Other titles: Duchess of Edinburgh, Countess of Ulster.

Countess	Portrait	Birth	Marriage(s)	Death
Grand Duchess Maria Alexandrovna of Russia; House of Holstein-Gottorp-Romanov; 1874–1900	Grand Duchess Maria Alexandrovna	17 October 1853; Alexander Palace, Russian Empire – daughter of Alexander II and Marie of Hesse and by Rhine	23 January 1874; Prince Alfred, Duke of Edinburgh; 5 children	24 October 1920 aged 67

=== Duchesses of Kent (United Kingdom, since 1934) ===
Subsidiary titles: Countess of St Andrews, Baroness Downpatrick.

Duchess	Portrait	Birth	Marriage(s)	Death	Arms
Princess Marina of Greece and Denmark; House of Glücksburg; 1934–1942	Marina	13 December 1906; Athens, Greece – daughter of Prince Nicholas and Grand Duchess Elena	29 November 1934; Prince George, Duke of Kent; 3 children	27 August 1968, aged 61	
Katharine Worsley; Worsley family 1961–2025	Katharine	22 February 1933; Hovingham Hall, Yorkshire – daughter of Sir William Worsley, 4th Baronet, and Joyce Brunner	8 June 1961; Prince Edward; 3 children	4 September 2025, aged 92	

== Possible future duchesses ==
Edward and Katharine's eldest son George Windsor, married Sylvana Tomaselli in 1988. They are currently known by the courtesy titles Earl and Countess of St Andrews. As George is three generations removed from the crown he is not a prince. Upon his accession Sylvana would be styled Her Grace The Duchess of Kent.

George and Sylvana's only son Edward, born in 1988, is currently unmarried.
