= Sir William Worsley, 6th Baronet =

British forester, farmer, and businessman

Sir William Worsley Bt FRICS FRASE DL
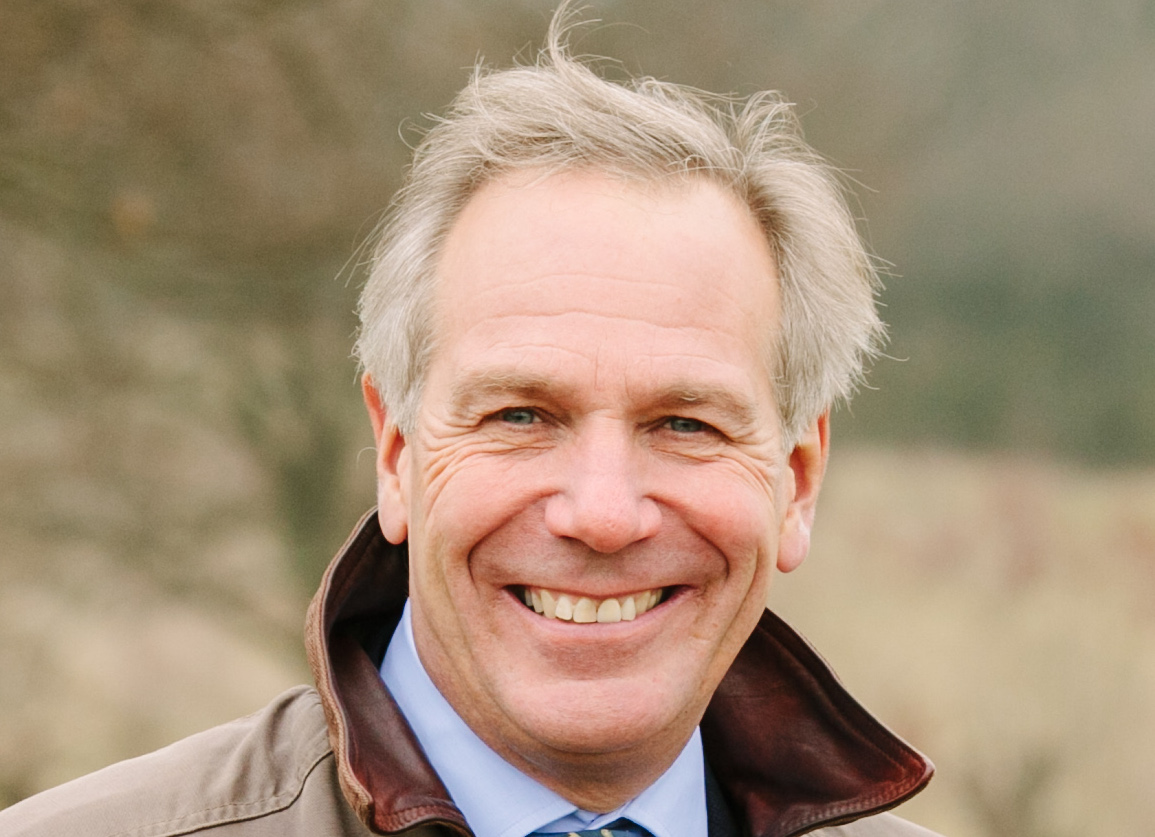
- Sir William Worsley, Bt.
- Born: William Ralph Worsley; 12 September 1956 (age 69)
- Title: Baronet
- Spouse: Marie-Noëlle Dreesmann (m. 1987)
- Children: 3
- Parent(s): Sir Marcus Worsley, 5th Baronet; Hon. Bridget Assheton

Sir William Ralph Worsley, 6th Baronet (born 12 September 1956), is a British forester, farmer and businessman.

He is a former Chair of the Forestry Commission and was Chairman of the National Forest Company. He was the Government's National Tree Champion.

== Early life and education ==
Worsley was born in York, the eldest son of Sir Marcus Worsley, 5th Baronet, and the Hon. Bridget Assheton, daughter of Ralph Assheton, 1st Baron Clitheroe. His paternal aunt was Katharine, Duchess of Kent. He was educated at Harrow School and the Royal Agricultural College, following which he qualified as a Chartered Surveyor.

== Career ==
He served as a Lieutenant in the Queen's Own Yeomanry from 1975 to 1980 and subsequently became Honorary Colonel of the Yorkshire Squadron of the Queen's Own Yeomanry from 2008 to 2015.

He is Chairman of the Howardian Hills Area of Outstanding Natural Beauty Joint Advisory Committee and served as a Secretary of State-appointed member on the North York Moors National Park Authority from 1994 to 1998. He was a member of the Independent Panel on Forestry between 2011 and 2012, and a member of the Forestry Commission's Advisory panel from 1999 to 2006. He was a member of the North Yorkshire Rural Commission from 2019 to 2021.

He was a Director of the Scarborough Building Society from 1996 to 2009 and was chairman from 2002 to 2009. He was a Director of the Skipton Building Society from 2009 to 2011 and The Brunner Investment Trust from 2000 to 2014.

He was President of the Country Land and Business Association (CLA) from 2009 to 2011. Deputy President and Chairman of the CLA Board from 2007 to 2009 and Vice-President and Chairman of Policy Committee from 2005 to 2007.

He was Chair of the National Forest Company responsible for the National Forest, the largest environmentally led regeneration project in England, covering 200 square miles of the midlands, from 2016 to 2020.

In 2018, following the launch of the Government’s 25-year Natural Environment plan, he was made the Government's Tree Champion, leading an initiative to co-ordinate forestry and woodlands in England, including planting 11 million trees plus a further one million in the towns and cities. He held this role till early 2020.

At the beginning of 2020 he was appointed as Chair of the Forestry Commission, a role which he held until March 2026.

In 2018 he was appointed a Lay Canon of York Minster and a member of Chapter and the Cathedral Council. He is a member of the Court of the Merchant Taylors' Company and was Mayor of the Company of the Merchants of the Staple of England from 2014 to 2015.

He was President of the Yorkshire Agricultural Society from 2020 to 2021.

He was appointed a Deputy Lieutenant of North Yorkshire in 2007. He was made a Fellow of the Royal Institution of Chartered Surveyors in 1992 and a Fellow of the Royal Agricultural Societies in 2018.

== Marriage and children ==
In 1987, Worsley married Marie-Noëlle Dreesmann, daughter of Bernard Dreesmann. They have three children:

- Isabella Claire Worsley (born 24 October 1988)
- Francesca Sylvia Worsley (born 5 March 1992)
- Marcus William Bernard Worsley (born 2 November 1995), heir apparent to the baronetcy.

Baronetage of the United Kingdom
Preceded by Marcus Worsley	Baronet of Hovingham Hall; 2012–present	Incumbent; Heir apparent: Marcus Worsley
