= Together at Christmas =

Together at Christmas may refer to:

- Together at Christmas (Etta Jones and Houston Person album)
- Together at Christmas (Michael Ball and Alfie Boe album)
- Together at Christmas (carol service)
