= Worsley baronets of Hovingham Hall (1838) =

Baronetcy in the Baronetage of the United Kingdom

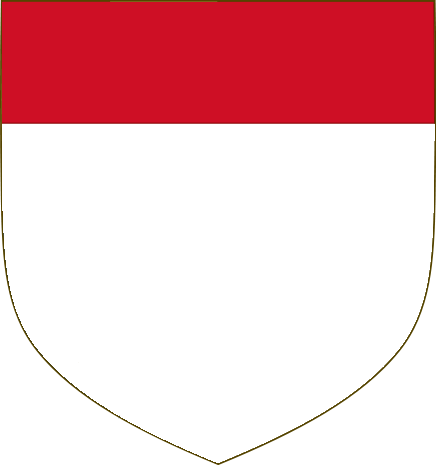
Escutcheon of the Worsley baronets of Hovingham Hall

The Worsley baronetcy, of Hovingham Hall in the County of York, was created in the Baronetage of the United Kingdom on 10 August 1838 for William Worsley, a Deputy Lieutenant for the North Riding. The 4th Baronet was Lord Lieutenant of the North Riding of Yorkshire and father of Katharine, Duchess of Kent. The 5th Baronet was a Conservative politician.

== Worsley baronets, of Hovingham Hall (1838) ==
- Sir William Worsley, 1st Baronet (1792–1879)
- Sir William Cayley Worsley, 2nd Baronet (1828–1897)
- Sir William Henry Arthington Worsley, 3rd Baronet (1861–1936)
- Colonel Sir William Arthington Worsley, 4th Baronet (1890–1973)
- Sir (William) Marcus John Worsley, 5th Baronet (1925–2012)
- Sir William Ralph Worsley, 6th Baronet (born 1956)

The heir apparent to the baronetcy is Marcus William Bernard Worsley (born 1995), only son of the 6th Baronet.

== Extended family ==
The botanist and explorer Arthington Worsley was a younger brother of the 3rd Baronet.

The 4th Baronet had a daughter, Katherine, who married Prince Edward, Duke of Kent (a grandson of King George V and first cousin of Queen Elizabeth II), in 1961, becoming a member of the British royal family.

=== Title succession chart ===
Title succession chart, Worsley baronets, of Hovingham Hall

Sir William Worsley; 1st Baronet; 1792–1879
Thomas Worsley; 1827–1855	Sir William Worsley; 2nd Baronet; 1828–1897	Arthington Worsley; 1830–1861
Sir William Worsley; 3rd Baronet; 1861–1936
Sir William Worsley; 4th Baronet; 1890–1973
Sir Marcus Worsley; 5th Baronet; 1925–2012
Sir William Worsley; 6th Baronet born 1956
Marcus Worsley born 1995

== Notes ==
Baronetage of the United Kingdom
Preceded by Heywood baronets	Worsley baronets of Hovingham Hall; 10 August 1838	Succeeded by Stuart-Menteth baronets
