= John Cavanagh (designer) =

Fashion designer (1914–2003)

- Born: John Bryan Cavanagh; 28 September 1914; County Mayo, Ireland
- Died: 24 March 2003 (aged 88)
- Occupation: Fashion designer
- Notable credit: Incorporated Society of London Fashion Designers

John Cavanagh (28 September 1914 – 24 March 2003) was an Irish couturier of the 1950s and 1960s. A member of the Incorporated Society of London Fashion Designers (IncSoc), his style has been described as reflecting Parisian chic. He designed the wedding dresses for the Duchess of Kent in 1961 and for Princess Alexandra in 1963.

== Early life ==
John Cavanagh strongly identified as Irish, telling reporters that he was born in County Mayo, although his obituary in The Times states he was born in London. He was educated at St Paul's School.

In 1932 Cavanagh was employed as a secretary for the couturier Edward Molyneux, first in London, and then in Paris. Molyneux insisted that Cavanagh learn how to draw before employing him. Through trial and error, Cavanagh rose to become supervisor of Molyneux's London branch, before becoming his personal assistant in Paris, where he learned how the haute couture business worked. In 1940, after war broke out, Cavanagh left Molyneux to join the British Army Intelligence Corps, where he was responsible for military intelligence and security. He was demobbed in 1946, and the following year became a design assistant for Pierre Balmain, for whom he worked until 1952.

== House of John Cavanagh ==
In 1952, Cavanagh launched his eponymous fashion house, John Cavanagh, at 26 Curzon Street, London. He joined IncSoc in the same year and after just one collection – unheard of at the time, for designers normally had to present at least four fashion collections before being considered for election.

His first collection was greeted enthusiastically by the fashion reviewer of The Times, who said: "He used some of the best fabrics to be found on both sides of the Channel, with a minimum of seams and maximum play with the grain of the materials themselves". The collection included boleros in piqué for daywear and satin for evening, a ballgown in Irish lace studded with crystals and a white grosgrain coat suitable for daytime or evening. The reviewer also noted his Dior model hats, faithfully copied in London by Simone Mirman – the first time Dior had allowed his designs to appear with any other couturier's clothes.

Cavanagh's reputation was cemented with his "Coronation" collection for Spring-Summer 1953, marking the coronation of Elizabeth II. It consisted of dresses made up in sumptuous fabrics designed by Oliver Messel for the Sekers fabric mills. Although he had only been in business for a year, members of the English aristocracy ordered his dresses to wear for the Coronation celebrations, such as the gold brocade gown worn by Lady Cornwallis (née Esme d'Beaumont (1901–1969)), wife of Baron Cornwallis.

Cavanagh was renowned for his elegant tailoring, sense of colour and sense of chic, as well as the high standard and quality of his designs. Many of his staff had formerly worked for couturiers such as Nina Ricci, Lucile, and Molyneux. He helped to train Clive, one of the last couturiers to be elected to IncSoc. From 1959, he collaborated with the milliner Reed Crawford.

Cavanagh's personal assistant from 1961 to 1966, Lindsay Evans Robertson, described his work as being:

"Paris in London. There was a lightness of touch, a feminine delicacy, a fragility unlike the work of any of the other London couturiers."

Cavanagh maintained a purity of line and form in all his designs. He designed clothes appropriate to the lifestyles of his predominantly British and American clientele, such as cocktail and evening dresses, and tailored suits. He aimed for his clothes to look equally good wherever they were worn, be it in London, Paris or New York. He also made two famous wedding dresses; the first was for the wedding of Katharine Worsley to Prince Edward, Duke of Kent, on 8 June 1961. Two years later, Princess Alexandra wore a magnolia lace wedding dress and veil from Cavanagh for her wedding to the Hon. Angus Ogilvy. Cavanagh also designed outfits for Princess Alexandra's mother, Princess Marina.

As fashion became more youth-focused in the 1960s, Cavanagh attempted to redefine his business by moving into ready-to-wear, but this was not a success and he retired in 1972. His tradition of creating couture for high-profile clients lived on in the work of Toronto-born designer Donald Campbell, who worked for Cavanagh from the mid-1950s on and set up on his own in 1973, later providing several distinctive outfits for Diana, Princess of Wales.
