= Alişan (name) =

Alişan (pronounced Alishan) is a Turkish given name and surname. It may refer to:

== Given name ==
- Alişan (born 1976), Turkish singer
- Alişan Şeker (born 1986), Turkish footballer

== Surname ==
- İlayda Alişan (born 1996), Turkish actress

== See also ==
- Alisan
  - Alisan Porter (born 1981), American actress
- Ghevont Alishan (1820–1901), ordained Armenian Catholic priest, historian and a poet
