= Giles Worsley =

English architectural historian

Giles Arthington Worsley FSA (22 March 1961 – 17 January 2006) was an English architectural historian, author, editor, journalist and critic, specialising in British country houses.

== Early life and education ==
Worsley was born on 22 March 1961 in North Yorkshire, the second of three sons of Sir Marcus Worsley, 5th Baronet and his wife the Hon Bridget Assheton (1926–2004), a daughter of Ralph Assheton, 1st Baron Clitheroe. His family moved into Hovingham Hall when he was aged 12, after his father inherited the baronetcy and estate, which in 2006 was 3,000 acres. He was a nephew of Katharine, Duchess of Kent.

Worsley was educated at Eton, studied Modern History at New College, Oxford (MA) including architectural history from Howard Colvin, and then in 1983 studied at the Courtauld Institute of Art (PhD, 1989) with his thesis on The Design and Development of the Stable and Riding House in Great Britain from the Thirteenth Century to 1914, which was later reworked into his 2004 book The British Stable.

== Career ==
Worsley joined Country Life weekly magazine in 1985 as an architectural writer, working for Clive Aslet and Marcus Binney, becoming architectural editor in 1989. In 1994 he left Country Life to take over from Dan Cruickshank as editor of the recently created Perspectives on Architecture monthly magazine, funded by Prince Charles through his Institute of Architecture. In March 1998 Perspectives on Architecture ceased publication after 33 issues (its February/March issue being the last) and he became the architecture correspondent of The Daily Telegraph newspaper in London, which he continued until his death in 2006. He was elected a fellow of the Society of Antiquaries of London (FSA) in 1999. He became a senior research fellow at the Institute of Historical Research in 2002, which he also continued until his death in 2006.

In 1988 he won the Society of Architectural Historians of Great Britain's Essay Medal. In 1995 his book Classical Architecture in Britain: the Heroic Age won the Yorkshire Post Best Art Book Award.

Honorary Positions held:

- Georgian Group Journal, editor, 1991–94.
- Georgian Group committee member.
- Somerset House Trust, member.
- The National Gallery Trustees, Building Committee member.
- Royal Fine Art Commission, member.
- Diana, Princess of Wales Memorial Fountain, Design Committee member, from 2001.

== Marriage and children ==
Worsley married Joanna Beaufort Pitman (born 1963, daughter of Peter Pitman), a writer and The Times journalist, a great-granddaughter of George Lawson Johnston, 1st Baron Luke, by her grandmother the Hon Margaret Beaufort Lawson Johnston who married Sir Isaac James Pitman, at St George's, Hanover Square, London on 21 September 1996. One of the page boys attending the bride was Edward Windsor, Lord Downpatrick, grandson of the Duke of Kent.

They had three daughters:

- Alice Beaufort Worsley (born 19 June 1998, on the pavement outside St Mary's Hospital, Paddington)
- Emma Sylvia Worsley (born 13 October 2000)
- Lucy Jennifer Worsley (born 9 October 2002)

== Death ==
Worsley's mother died of cancer on 22 May 2004 and he was diagnosed with cancer in the Spring of 2005. He died in London on 17 January 2006 at the age of 44. His funeral took place in Hovingham, North Yorkshire on 26 January 2006. A service celebrating his life was held in London on 9 March 2006. A memorial plaque was placed at St Clement's Church, North Kensington, London.

== Travel Fellowship ==
The annual Giles Worsley Travel Fellowship was announced in February 2007 by the RIBA and the British School at Rome. The Fellowship is awarded each year to an architect or architectural historian, who then spends three months (October to December) at the British School at Rome, studying an architectural topic of their choice. Travel, accommodation and board and a monthly stipend is provided. Each Fellow is then required to deliver a public presentation on their return. The first applications were received in February 2008, with the recipient being announced in April.

Recipients and their topics:

- 2008 – Rebecca Madgin, The contemporary value of industrial architecture – the Ostiense Quarter.
- 2009 – Gwyn Lloyd Jones, Rome, a meeting ground of two architectural geniuses: Francesco Borromini and Frank Lloyd Wright.
- 2010 – Léa-Catherine Szacka, Roma Interrotta: A comparative historical analysis of the 18th Century urban project on display (1978 to 2008).
- 2011 – Rashid Ali, Architecture and urbanism of Mogadishu 1930–80.
- 2012 – Thomas Brigden, The city of Rome's key vistas and their viewing places.
- 2013 - Tom True, "Power and place: the Marchigian cardinals of Sixtus V".
- 2014 - Ricardo Agarez, "The making of the Roman palzzina, 1930-60".
- 2015 - Mark Kelly, "Ancient and modern concrete vaulting in Rome".
- 2016 - Jana Schuster, "Living Heritage: The Adaptive Reuse of Ancient Buildings in Rome".

== Books ==
- Architectural Drawings of the Regency Period 1790–1837 (1991) catalogue of exhibition of RIBA Drawings Collection at its Heinz Gallery in London, Andre Deutsch, ISBN 0-233-98625-1, ISBN 978-0-233-98625-8.
- The Georgian Group Journal, and various Georgian Group Symposiums, editor, 1991–94.
- Classical Architecture in Britain: the Heroic Age (1995) Paul Mellon Centre for Studies in British Art, Yale University Press, ISBN 0-300-05896-9, ISBN 978-0-300-05896-3.
- The Life and Works of John Carr of York (2000) by the late Brian Wragg, edited by Giles Worsley, Oblong Creative, ISBN 0-9536574-2-6, ISBN 978-0-9536574-2-1.
- England's Lost Houses: From the Archives of Country Life (2002) Aurum Press, ISBN 1-85410-820-4, ISBN 978-1-85410-820-3.
- The British Stable (2004) An Architectural and Social History (based on Worsley's PhD thesis), photography by William Curtis Rolf, Paul Mellon Centre for Studies in British Art, Yale University Press, ISBN 0-300-10708-0, ISBN 978-0-300-10708-1.
- Drawing from the Past: William Weddell and the Transformation of Newby Hall (2005) by Giles Worsley, Kerry Bristol, and William Connor (catalogue of 2004–5 exhibition of Robert Adam's sculpture gallery drawings held at Leeds Art Gallery), Jeremy Mills Publishing, ISBN 0-901981-69-9, ISBN 978-0-901981-69-1.
- Inigo Jones and the European Classicist Tradition (2007) published posthumously, Paul Mellon Centre for Studies in British Art, Yale University Press, ISBN 0-300-11729-9, ISBN 978-0-300-11729-5.

== Articles ==
- Gothic Architecture and Its Meanings, 1550–1830 (2002) edited by Michael Hall, based on a Georgian Group Symposium, with Giles Worsley explaining Vanbrugh's architecture in terms of the search for a national style, Spire Books, ISBN 0-9543615-0-4, ISBN 978-0-9543615-0-1.
- Aske Hall, Yorkshire, the seat of the Marquess of Zetland, Parts I & II, Country Life, 1 March 1990 and 8 March 1990 (pages 98–103).
- Silver Tassie, Wargrave, Berkshire - 'A Home Fit for Ratty' Country Life 18 June 1992
