= Together at Christmas (carol service) =

Annual Christmas carol service

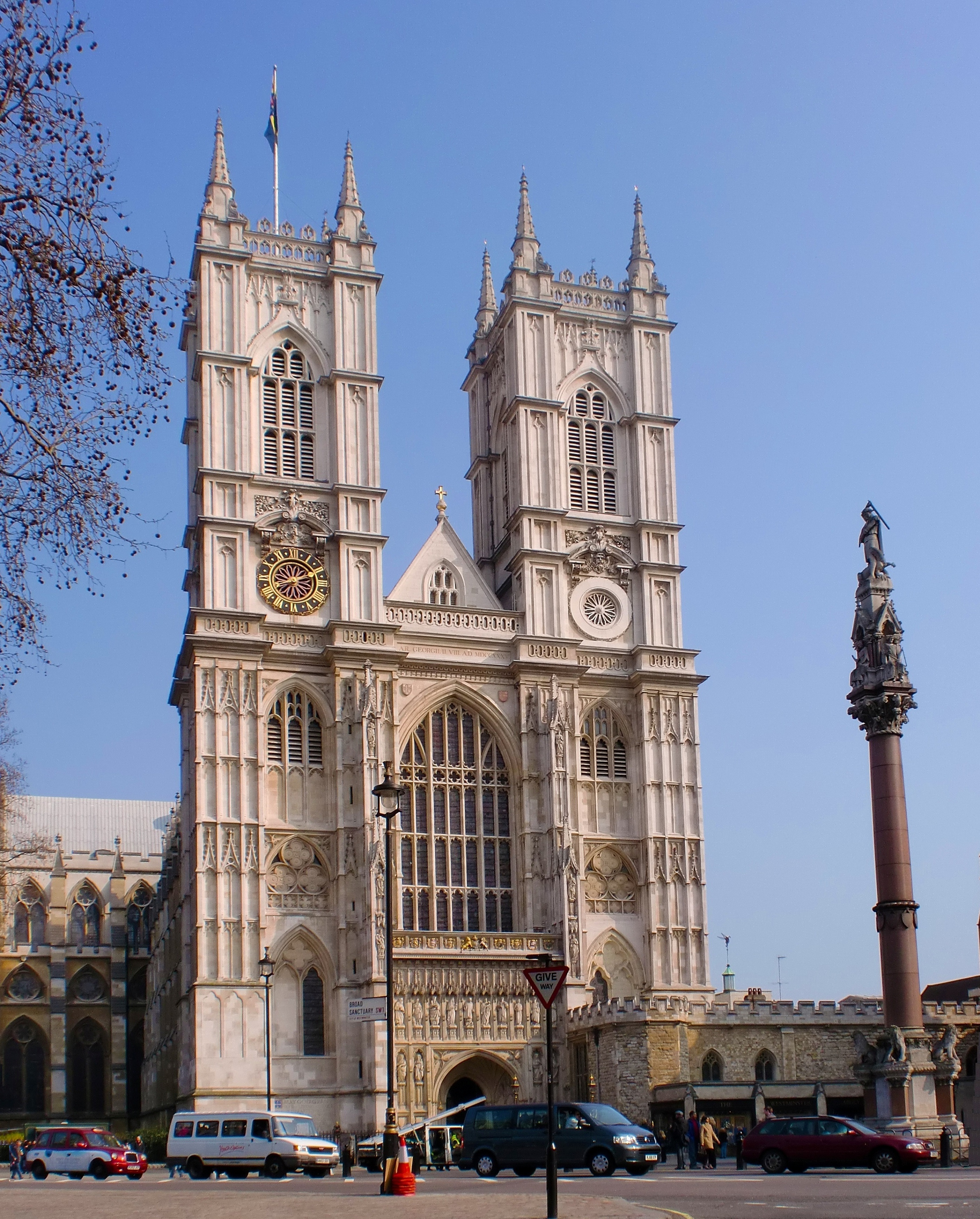
- Westminster Abbey, where the service is held
- Venue: Westminster Abbey
- Location: London, United Kingdom
- Type: Christmas carol service
- Patron: Catherine, Princess of Wales
- Organised by: Royal Foundation

Together at Christmas is an annual Christmas carol service held at Westminster Abbey in London. Established in 2021, the event is hosted by Catherine, Princess of Wales and organised by the Royal Foundation, the charity of the Prince and Princess of Wales. The service includes invited guests from across the United Kingdom, including individuals recognised for service to their communities, and features carols, musical performances, and readings. It is broadcast on television and radio in the UK as a Christmas special.

== 2021 ==
The first Together at Christmas carol service was held at Westminster Abbey in December 2021. It was hosted by Catherine, then known as the Duchess of Cambridge, and was intended to recognise people who had supported their communities during the COVID-19 pandemic. The service was supported by the Royal Foundation.

The service included performances by Leona Lewis and Ellie Goulding, a reading by Prince William as well as appearances by the actor Tom Felton and the poet Lemn Sissay. Catherine played the piano during a performance of "For Those Who Can't Be Here" by Tom Walker. It marked her first public musical performance. One thousand two hundred invited guests were recognised for their contributions during the pandemic. These included Jordan Henderson, for his role in organising Premier League players' donations to the NHS; Angela Hartnett, who supported hospital staff through large-scale meal provision; and Jason Manford, who assisted with local deliveries during shortages. The service was broadcast on Christmas Eve and included an introduction from Catherine.

== 2022 ==
The 2022 service acknowledged the voluntary and community contributions of individuals and organisations across the United Kingdom, and the sense of connection such work can foster. Kensington Palace dedicated the service to Queen Elizabeth II, who died in September that year.

The Abbey was decorated with a Christmas tree adorned with small Paddington Bear ornaments, and guests entered through falling atmospheric synthetic snow created for the event. The programme featured performances by the singer Craig David, the actress Samantha Barks, and a duet by Alfie Boe and Melanie C. Readings were given by Prince William, the actress Kristin Scott Thomas and the actor Hugh Bonneville.

Members of the royal family attended the service, including King Charles III and Queen Camilla, as well as extended family members. The service was attended by around 2,000 invited guests recognised for their work in supporting others.

A public vote selected "O Come, All Ye Faithful" as the final carol, sung in tribute to the late queen. The service was broadcast on ITV on Christmas Eve and narrated by the actress Catherine Zeta-Jones.

== 2023 ==
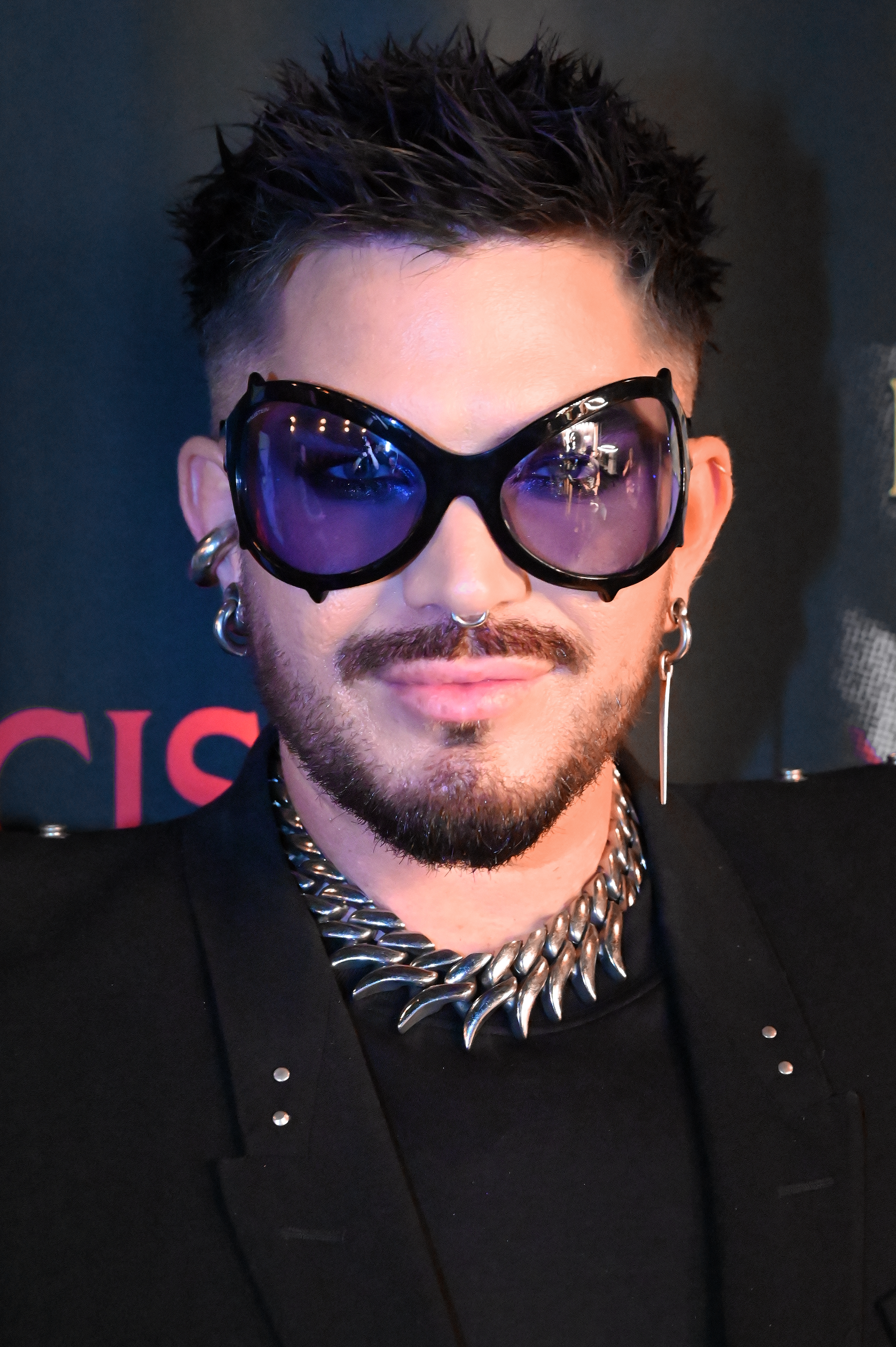
Adam Lambert (left) and Freya Ridings performed a duet at the service.

The 2023 service highlighted charities, professionals and volunteers supporting babies, young children, and families across the United Kingdom.

Performances included contributions from the Choir of Westminster Abbey and guest artists such as Jacob Collier, Freya Ridings and James Bay. A duet was given by Beverley Knight and Adam Lambert.

Readings were given by the actor Jim Broadbent, the broadcaster Roman Kemp, the actor Micheal Ward, the broadcaster Emma Willis, and Prince William. A poem written by the Children's Laureate Joseph Coelho was also read by Leonie Elliott.

One thousand five hundred guests were invited in recognition of their work supporting babies, young children and families. The service was also attended by members of the extended royal family, as well as Catherine's parents, Carole and Michael Middleton, and her sister Pippa. It was the first occasion on which all three of William and Catherine's children—George, Charlotte, and Louis—attended the service. The service was broadcast on ITV1 and ITVX on Christmas Eve.

== 2024 ==
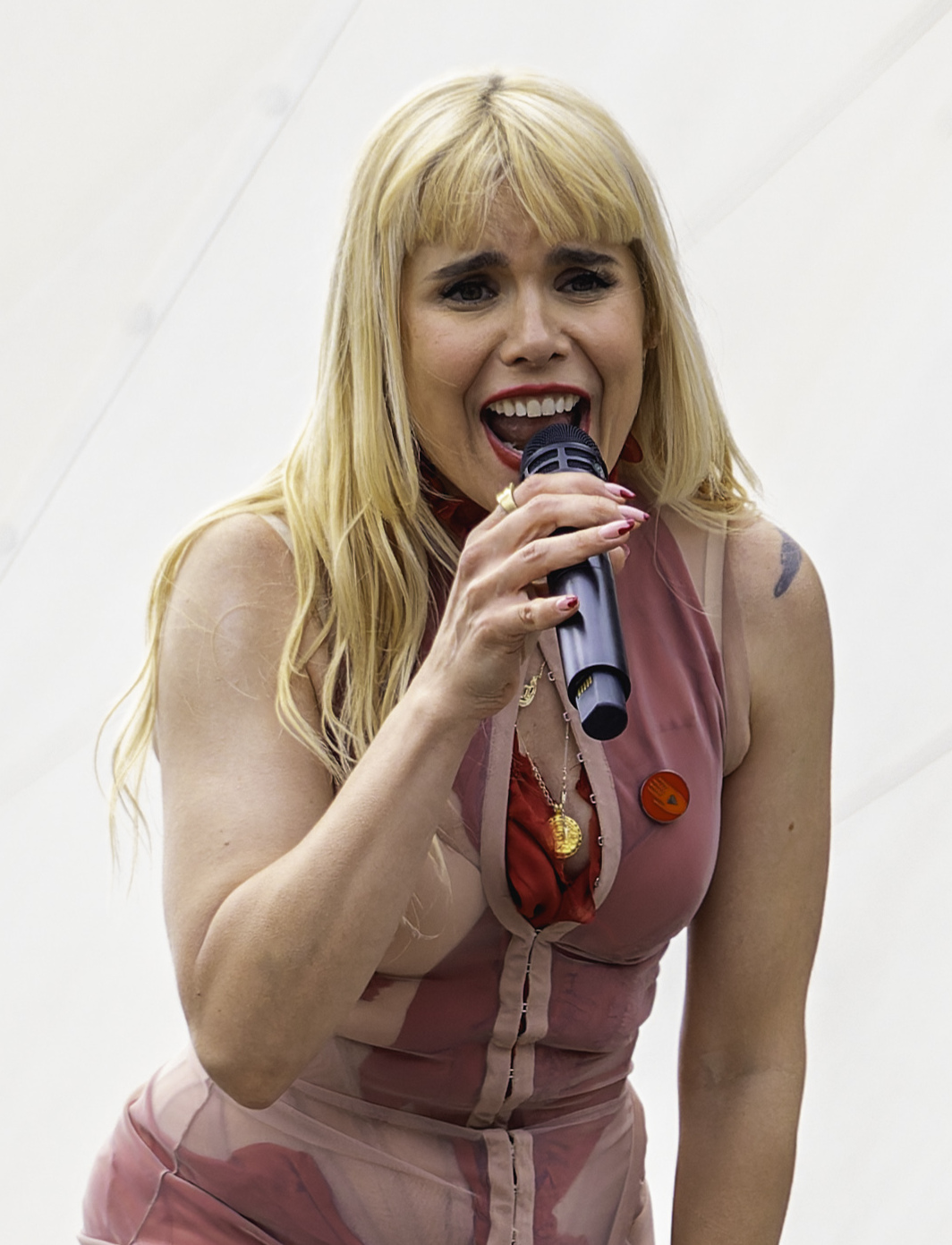
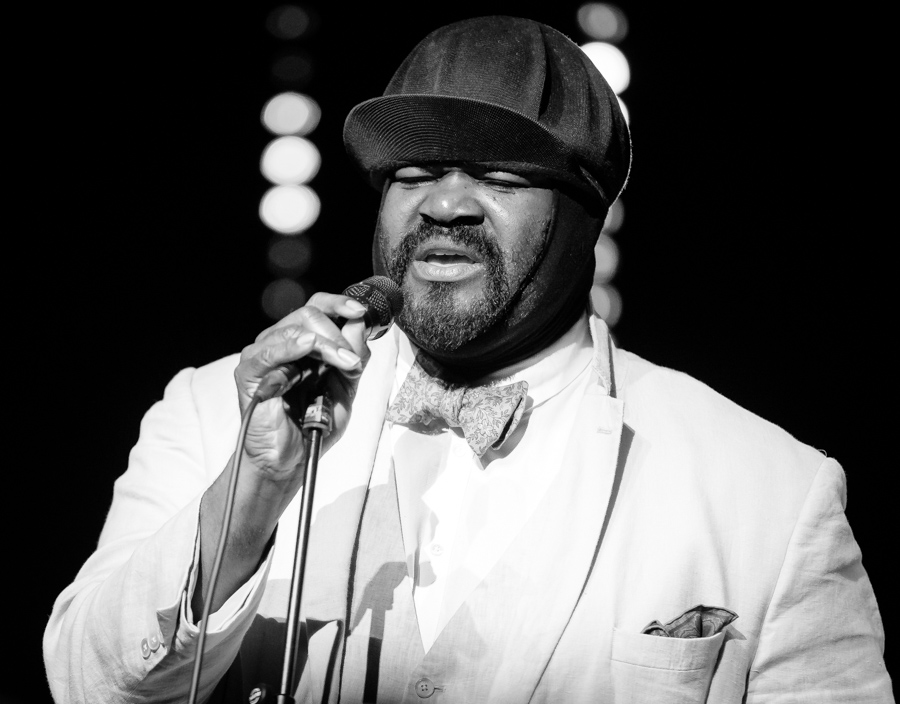
Paloma Faith (left) and Gregory Porter performed a duet at the service.

The 2024 service celebrated kindness, empathy, and support for others. The service was attended by One thousand six hundred invited guests from across the United Kingdom, recognised for their service to their communities. A specially commissioned illustration by Charlie Mackesy was featured on the Order of Service, and a "Kindness Tree" invited guests to dedicate decorations to people who had shown them care and support.

Performances were given by the Choir of Westminster Abbey, soloists from the Royal Ballet, and the singers Paloma Faith, Olivia Dean, and Gregory Porter. Readings linked to the theme were given by Prince William, the actor Richard E. Grant, the actresses Michelle Dockery and Sophie Okonedo, and the swimmer Adam Peaty. The service was broadcast on Christmas Eve in the United Kingdom as a special on ITV.

== 2025 ==
The 2025 service had the theme "the power of love and togetherness" and recognised people across the UK who contributed to society.

Musical performances were given by the Choir of Westminster Abbey alongside invited artists. Performers included Katie Melua, Griff, Fisherman's Friends, Zak Abel, and performers from the charity Future Talent. Readings were given by Prince William, the actor Chiwetel Ejiofor, and the actress Kate Winslet. Catherine and her daughter Charlotte performed a piano duet for the service recorded by Erland Cooper. Their performance was recorded in the Inner Hall of Windsor Castle prior to the service and broadcast alongside the service.

One thousand six hundred guests were invited to the service. They included the chef and food writer Mary Berry, the actress Hannah Waddingham, the actor Eugene Levy, the Holocaust survivor Steven Frank, and veterans of the Second World War. The service was broadcast in the United Kingdom on Christmas Eve on ITV1 and ITVX.
