= Sir Marcus Worsley, 5th Baronet =

British politician

Sir Marcus Worsley DL JP

Lord Lieutenant of North Yorkshire
- In office 1987–1999
- Monarch: Elizabeth II
- Preceded by: Oswald Phipps, 4th Marquess of Normanby
- Succeeded by: James Dugdale, 2nd Baron Crathorne

Member of Parliament for Chelsea
- In office 31 March 1966 – 20 September 1974
- Preceded by: John Litchfield
- Succeeded by: Nicholas Scott

Member of Parliament for Keighley
- In office 8 October 1959 – 25 September 1964
- Preceded by: Charles Hobson
- Succeeded by: John Binns

Personal details
- Born: William Marcus John Worsley; 6 April 1925
- Died: 18 December 2012 (aged 87)
- Spouse: Bridget Assheton (m. 1955)
- Children: William Ralph Worsley; Sarah Marianne Worsley; Giles Arthington Worsley; Peter Marcus Worsley
- Parent(s): William Arthington Worsley; Joyce Morgan Brunner

Sir (William) Marcus John Worsley, 5th Baronet (6 April 1925 – 18 December 2012), was a British Conservative Party politician. He served as a Member of Parliament in four parliaments between 1959 and 1974, and served as High Sheriff and Lord Lieutenant for North Yorkshire.

== Early life and education ==
Worsley was born in the family home of Hovingham Hall, near Malton, North Yorkshire, the eldest son of Colonel Sir William Worsley, 4th Baronet, and Joyce Morgan Brunner. He was the eldest brother of Katharine, Duchess of Kent. He was educated at Eton. After conscripted service in the Green Howards, which included a secondment to the Royal West African Frontier Force, he graduated as BA from New College, Oxford, in 1949.

== Career ==
Worsley was a Councillor on Malton Rural District Council from 1955, serving as vice-chairman in 1965.

He was an unsuccessful candidate at the 1955 election for the marginal constituency of Keighley in West Yorkshire. However, at the 1959 election he defeated the sitting Labour Member of Parliament (MP) Charles Hobson, taking the seat with a majority of only 170. At the 1964 general election, he lost his Keighley seat to Labour's John Binns, but for the 1966 election he was selected as candidate for the safe Conservative seat of Chelsea in west London. He held that seat for three Parliaments, before retiring at the October 1974 general election. He served as the Second Church Estates Commissioner, the church of England's link to the House of Commons, from 1970 to 1974.

In 1973, when he inherited the title and estate, he moved back into Hovingham Hall and managed the 3,000-acre (12 km^{2}) estate. In 1982 he was appointed High Sheriff of North Yorkshire.

In 1978 he was appointed a Deputy Lieutenant for North Yorkshire, serving as Lord Lieutenant from 1987 to 1999. He also served the county as High Sheriff from 1982 to 1983. He was appointed a Knight of Justice of the Order of Saint John in 1987.

Worsley was active in the National Trust becoming Chairman of the Yorkshire Regional Committee between 1969 and 1994 and for a time Chair of the Trust's Properties Committee, overseeing approval of the acquisition of many significant property acquisitions including Canons Ashby (1981), Belton House (1984), Calke Abbey (1985) and Keddleston Hall (1987). He served as Deputy Chairman of the Trust between 1986 and 1992.

== Marriage and children ==
In 1955 Worsley married the Hon. Bridget Assheton (20 August 1926 – 22 May 2004), daughter of Ralph Assheton, 1st Baron Clitheroe, and the Hon. Sylvia Benita Frances Hotham. They had four children together:

- Sir William Ralph Worsley, 6th Baronet (born 12 September 1956)
- Sarah Marianne Worsley (born 25 June 1958)
- Giles Arthington Worsley (22 March 1961 – 17 January 2006)
- Peter Marcus Worsley (born 15 September 1963)

== Death ==
Worsley died on 18 December 2012 at Hovingham Hall at the age of 87 and was buried in Hovingham cemetery. His eldest son William succeeded to the baronetcy.

Parliament of the United Kingdom
Preceded by Charles Hobson	Member of Parliament for Keighley; 1959–1964	Succeeded by John Binns
Preceded by John Litchfield	Member of Parliament for Chelsea; 1966 – October 1974	Succeeded by Nicholas Scott
Honorary titles
Preceded by The Marquess of Normanby	Lord Lieutenant of North Yorkshire; 1987–1999	Succeeded by The Lord Crathorne
Baronetage of the United Kingdom
Preceded by William Arthington Worsley	Baronet of Hovingham Hall; 1973–2012	Succeeded by William Ralph Worsley
