= Moran Caplat =

English actor and opera administrator (1916–2003)

Moran Victor Hingston Caplat, CBE (1 October 1916 - 19 June 2003) was an English opera manager, associated throughout his career with Glyndebourne Festival Opera.

== Life and career ==
=== Early years ===
Caplat was born in Herne Bay, Kent, the only child of Armand Charles Victor Roger Caplat, a French-born architect, and his wife, Norah Bessie, née Hingston. He was educated locally. When he was fifteen he saw a touring production of Twelfth Night by the Ben Greet company which made him stage-struck, and in 1933 he was accepted as a student at the Royal Academy of Dramatic Art, London.

After graduation from the academy, Caplat acted in repertory companies at Margate and Croydon and toured with Matheson Lang. He appeared in a couple of films and acted in Stephen Spender's first play, Trial of a Judge, at the Unity Theatre, London. His last position as an actor was with the local repertory company in Sevenoaks.

Caplat was a keen yachtsman, and with war approaching he joined the Royal Navy Volunteer Supplementary Reserve (known unofficially as the "Yachtsman's Reserve"). During the Second World War he had a distinguished naval career, ending it as a Lieutenant Commander. In 1943 he married Diana Downton. They had two daughters and two sons, one of whom predeceased his parents. Their daughter Simone married the historian David Sekers, son of the industrialist Nicholas Sekers.

After Caplat was released from the navy in 1945 a relative put him in touch with Glyndebourne Festival Opera, which was resuming productions after a wartime gap. The company needed an assistant to its manager, Rudolf Bing. The latter was impressed with Caplat, as were the proprietors of the company, John and Audrey Christie, and he took up post at Glyndebourne in October 1945.

=== Glyndebourne ===
At that time Glyndebourne had close ties with the Edinburgh Festival, where its early post-war productions were premiered. Bing was a key figure of that festival, and in 1947 he was appointed its director. He remained Glyndebourne's general manager, but Caplat had day-to-day responsibility there. In 1949 Bing left Britain for the US, to run the Metropolitan Opera; Caplat was promoted to general manager of Glyndebourne.

He remained in the post until he retired, aged sixty-five, in 1981. During his tenure, Glyndebourne increased the length and scope of the festival from fourteen performances of two operas in 1950, to seventy performances of six operas in 1960. Christie retired in 1959, handing the running of the festival to his son George, whom Caplat guided in his early years in charge. Caplat also ensured continuity of Glyndebourne's traditions and standards, through the musical directorships of Fritz Busch, Vittorio Gui, John Pritchard and Bernard Haitink with successive directors of productions, Carl Ebert, Günther Rennert, John Cox and Peter Hall.

Caplat arranged overseas performances of Glyndebourne productions: La Cenerentola in Berlin (1954), Falstaff and Le Comte Ory in Paris (1958); Don Giovanni and Il matrimonio segreto in Sweden, Norway and Denmark (1967) and L'Ormindo in Munich (1969). When Glyndebourne productions were brought to the Proms, Caplat took charge of the semi-staging at the Albert Hall. Another key role was talent spotting. Caplat toured Europe looking for future stars, sometimes accompanied by one or more of the Christies, sometimes on his own. Among those appearing in Glyndebourne productions early in their careers were Sena Jurinac and Birgit Nilsson in 1951 and Luciano Pavarotti in 1964. Operas receiving their UK professional premieres in Caplat's time included Idomeneo (1951), The Rake's Progress (1953), La voix humaine (1960) and Intermezzo (1974). Caplat encouraged the conductor Raymond Leppard to revive neglected early operas, and Glyndebourne gave the first British productions of L'incoronazione di Poppea (1962) L'Ormindo (1967), La Calisto (1970) and Il ritorno d'Ulisse in patria (1972).

Caplat was particularly interested in good stage design, hitherto a weakness at Glyndebourne. He brought in leading British designers, including Hugh Casson, Leslie Hurry, Osbert Lancaster, Oliver Messel and John Piper. Later designers during Caplat's tenure included John Bury, Jean-Pierre Ponnelle, Erté and David Hockney.

In his sixties, Caplat began handing over responsibility to his deputy, Brian Dickie, who succeeded him in 1981. The Financial Times commented, "When Moran Caplat left Glyndebourne at 65 he was one of the longest-serving opera administrators in Europe. Moreover he handed over one of Europe's most successful houses."

Caplat died in Tunbridge Wells at the age of 86.

== Sources ==
- Boston, Richard (1989). Osbert: A Portrait of Osbert Lancaster. London: Collins. ISBN 978-0-00-216324-8.
