= Chesham Building Society =

UK building society

- Company type: Building Society (Mutual)
- Industry: Banking and financial services
- Founded: 1845
- Fate: Merged with Skipton Building Society, 2010
- Headquarters: Chesham, England, UK
- Products: Savings, Mortgages, Investments, Loans, Credit Cards, Insurance

The Chesham Building Society was a building society based in the market town of Chesham in Buckinghamshire, England, which merged with the Skipton Building Society in June 2010. Prior to the merger it was the 37th largest building society in the United Kingdom based on its total assets of £231 million. It was a member of the Building Societies Association.

== History ==
The society was founded in 1845. Its logo was a stylised chess piece, a pun on the name of the River Chess, the local river. On 24 February 2010 the society announced a proposed merger with the Skipton Building Society. This was approved by Chesham Members at their AGM on 31 March 2010 with just over 80 percent of both savers and borrowers voting in favour. The merger of the two societies took place on 1 June 2010. The enlarged society operates under the Skipton name.
