= Constantine Phipps =

Constantine Phipps may refer to:

- Constantine Phipps (Lord Chancellor of Ireland) (1656–1723)
- Constantine Phipps, 1st Baron Mulgrave (1722–1775)
- Constantine Phipps, 2nd Baron Mulgrave (1744–1792)
- Constantine Phipps, 1st Marquess of Normanby (1797–1863)
- Constantine Phipps, 3rd Marquess of Normanby (1846–1932)
- Constantine Phipps, 5th Marquess of Normanby (born 1954)
- Sir Constantine Phipps (diplomat) (1840–1911)
