= Alisan =

Alisan is a given name. Notable people with the name include:

- Alisan Porter (born 1981), American singer, actress, and dancer

== See also ==
- Alişan (given name), Turkish name
