= Şəkər =

Şəkər or Shekher may refer to:

- Şəkər, Goychay, Azerbaijan
- Şəkər, Khojavend, Azerbaijan

== See also ==
- Sheker
