= Oswald Phipps, 4th Marquess of Normanby =

British peer and philanthropist

The Most Honourable The Marquess of Normanby KG CBE
- The Marquess of Normanby, by Richard Foster.
- Born: 29 July 1912
- Died: 30 January 1994 (aged 81)
- Buried: St Oswald Churchyard Lythe, England
- Spouse: Grania Maeve Rosaura Guinness (m. 1951)
- Issue: 7, including Constantine
- Father: Constantine Phipps, 3rd Marquess of Normanby
- Mother: Gertrude Stansfeld Foster

Oswald Constantine John Phipps, 4th Marquess of Normanby (29 July 1912 – 30 January 1994), styled Earl of Mulgrave until 1932, was a British peer and philanthropist for blind people.

== Early life and education ==
The only son of Constantine Phipps, 3rd Marquess of Normanby and his wife Gertrude Stansfeld Foster, he was educated at Lambrook preparatory school, Eton College and Christ Church, Oxford. He inherited the marquessate and other titles upon his father's death in 1932.

== Military service ==
Lord Normanby joined the Green Howards as a Lieutenant in 1939. In 1940, he was captured at the Battle of Dunkirk and was held as a prisoner of war at Obermassfeldt in Thuringia until 1943.

During his captivity, he persuaded his captors to allow him to teach braille to the blind prisoners, despite not knowing it himself. They constructed their alphabets with glass-headed pins and cardboard. He progressed from this to teach lessons in wider subjects. In recognition of his successful independent efforts, the head of St Dunstan's charity for blinded service personnel, Lord Fraser of Lonsdale appointed him an honorary member of the charity's teaching staff. Later, when he was repatriated along with his blind students, he joined St Dunstan's council.

Normanby was awarded a military MBE in recognition of his work in leading the POWs.

== Political career ==
On his release, Lord Normanby was Parliamentary Private Secretary to the Secretary of State for Dominion Affairs, Viscount Cranborne, from 1944 to 1945. He briefly served in the same post for the Lord President of the Council, Frederick Marquis, 1st Earl of Woolton, in 1945. That year, Lord Normanby was also appointed a Lord-in-waiting, but the appointment was brief due to his crossing the floor, becoming the only Labour marquess (he later left the Labour Party also and became a crossbencher).

== Later years ==
Lord Normanby was Chairman of King's College Hospital from 1948 (for which he was promoted to a CBE in 1974) until his death. As well as being a member of St Dunstan's council, he was also chairman of the National Library for the Blind from 1946 until his death and its president from 1977 to 1988. He was Lord Lieutenant of the North Riding of Yorkshire from 1965 to 1974 and then, following the reorganisation of local government in 1974, Lord Lieutenant of North Yorkshire from 1974 to 1987.

In 1985, Normanby was made a Knight Companion of the Order of the Garter (KG).

== Marriage and children ==
On 10 February 1951, Lord Normanby married Hon Grania Maeve Rosaura Guinness (14 April 1920 – 15 January 2018), a member of the Guinness family and daughter of Walter Guinness, 1st Baron Moyne. They had seven children:

- Lady Lepel Sophia Phipps (born 12 May 1952)
- Constantine Edmund Walter Phipps, 5th Marquess of Normanby (born 24 February 1954)
- Lady Evelyn Rose Phipps (18 November 1955 – 17 August 2018), married novelist Hon James Buchan in 1986.
- Lord Justin Charles Phipps (born 1 March 1958)
- Lady Peronel Katherine Phipps (born 8 October 1959)
- Lady Henrietta Laura Phipps (born 29 November 1962)
- Lady Anne Elizabeth Grania Phipps (14 October 1965 – 18 March 2024)

Lady Normanby managed the Phipps family estate at Mulgrave as well as Bailiffscourt Estate in Sussex, inherited from her father. She also owned Warter Priory. Lady Normanby set up the Captain Cook Memorial Museum in Whitby and served as a magistrate on the local bench.

== Death ==
Lord Normanby died in 1994, aged 81. The marquessate and other titles passed to his elder son, Constantine. He is buried in the churchyard of the Church of St Oswald, Lythe.

The Dowager Marchioness of Normanby died in 2018, aged 97.

== Coat of Arms ==
Coat of arms of Oswald Phipps, 4th Marquess of Normanby, KG, CBE
Coronet Coronet of a Marquess Crest A bear's gamb erased Sable grasping a trefoil slipped Argent. Escutcheon 1st and 4th Sable a trefoil slipped between eight mullets in orle Argent (Phipps); 2nd paly of six Argent and Azure a bend Gules (Annesley); 3rd quarterly 1 and 4 France quartering England; 2 Scotland; 3 Ireland; a border compony Ermine and Azure charged with a fleur-de-ls Or (Darnley). Motto VIRTUTE QUIES Orders Order of the Garter; Order of the British Empire

== Notes ==
Political offices
Preceded by The Earl Fortescue	Lord-in-waiting; 1945	Succeeded by The Lord Pakenham
Honorary titles
Preceded by Sir William Worsley, Bt	Lord Lieutenant of the North Riding of Yorkshire; 1965–1974	Office abolished
New office	Lord Lieutenant of North Yorkshire; 1974–1987	Succeeded by Sir Marcus Worsley, Bt
Peerage of the United Kingdom
Preceded by Constantine Phipps	Marquess of Normanby; 1932–1994	Succeeded by Constantine Phipps
