= Suzanne Balkanyi =

French-Hungarian artist (1922–2005)

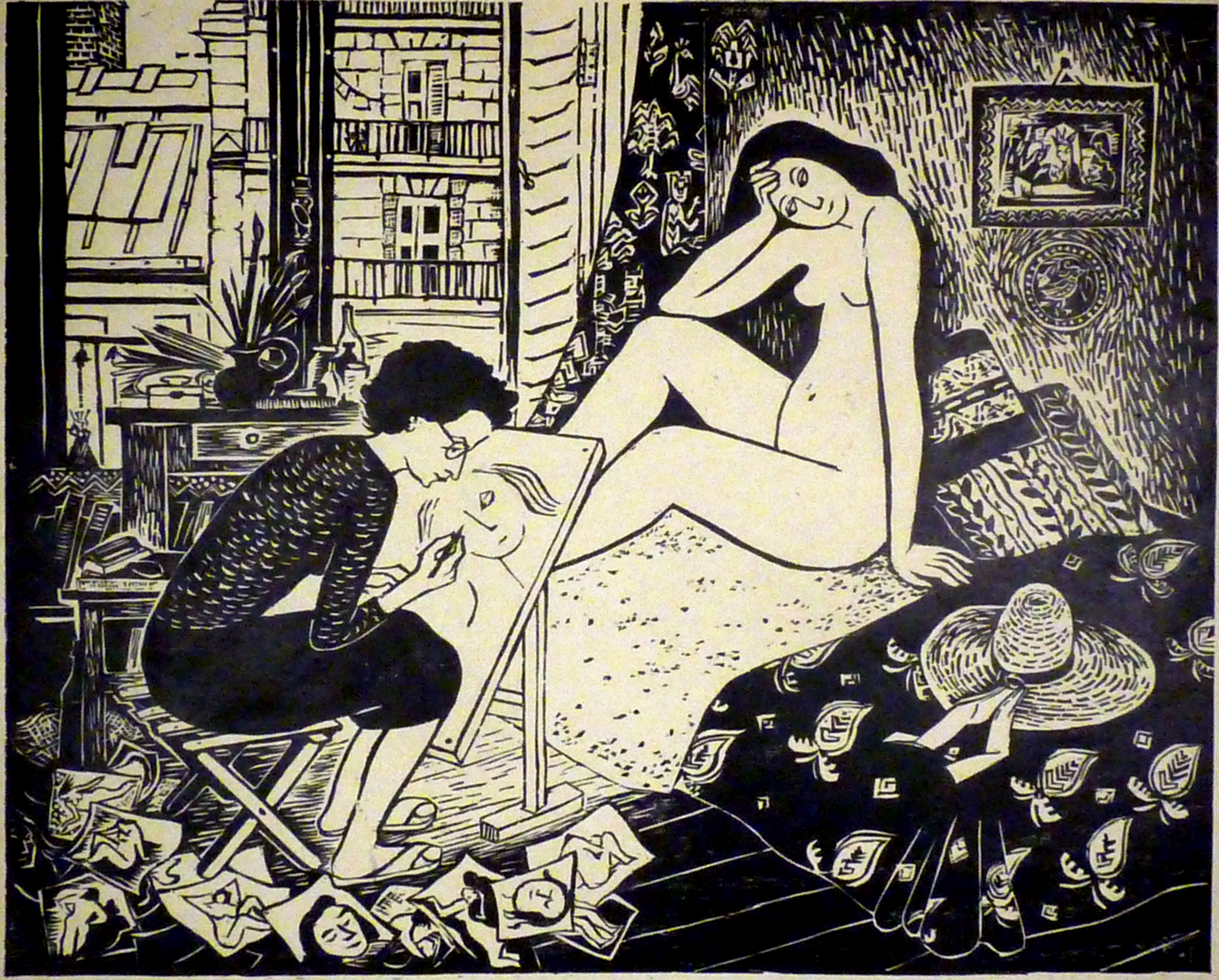
- Suzanne Balkanyi, self-portrait in Paris 1952
- Born: 14 March 1922; Budapest, Hungary
- Died: 7 April 2005 (aged 83)
- Education: École Nationale Supérieure des Beaux-Arts
- Relatives: Nicholas Sekers (brother-in-law)

Suzanne Balkanyi (14 March 1922 – 7 April 2005) was a French-Hungarian artist, known particularly for her humorous etchings of Paris street scenes. After narrowly escaping transportation to Auschwitz in 1944, she left Hungary in 1947 to live in Paris, where she worked until her death.

== Early life ==
One of four daughters of a liberal intellectual Hungarian family, Suzanne Balkanyi was born in Budapest in 1922, and studied at the École Nationale Supérieure des Beaux-Arts, Paris. Her sister, Agota Anna Balkanyi, married the Hungarian-born British industrialist Nicholas Sekers.

== Career ==
The earliest known reference to Balkanyi as an artist, refers to her exhibiting at the Jewish Students Union in Paris in December 1948. While working as an illustrator in the Ménagerie du Jardin des Plantes in Paris, she continued to develop her own work, commenting wryly on Paris life in drawing, etchings, woodblocks and other print techniques.

In the 1950s, she began to travel to Provence, and the little seaports of Brittany and Normandy. Later travels took her to Italy (Perugia, Venice and Siena), the Netherlands, Spain (Toledo), Israel, Morocco and Senegal.

At her first one-woman show in 1966, she was recognised as "a printmaker of real and considerable quality" by the French artist André Dunoyer de Segonzac ("Son sens du ridicule ... révèle une sensibilité et une humanité très originale et sa technique d’aquafortiste d’une rare spontanéité qui touche à la naïveté, d’une réelle et très grande qualité").

By the time of her death, she had had some eight solo exhibitions in Paris, was a founder-member of the Society of Engravers known as Pointe et Burin Paris and had shown regularly at the Fondation Taylor. In London her work has been shown posthumously at the Abbott and Holder gallery. In August 2018, the Leicester Print Workshop mounted an exhibition of Balkanyi's work. Public collections holding her work include those of the City of Paris (Un arrêt d’autobus), the Musée du Louvre Print Collection (Deux vieilles femmes , Lourmarin, Salon de couture, Vue de Lourmarin ), the Zurich Kunsthaus, the Musée de Beaux-Arts de Belfort, the Victoria and Albert Museum, and The British Museum (La Rotisserie). Her images have been published in: Acceuil de Paris, Le Trait, La Pointe et Burin and La Gravure Originale. Balkanyi illustrated a number of books including Francis Ambiére's Le Bon Marché and Brussac Philippe and Pierre Mac Orlan's La Légion Étrangère .

== Legacy ==
The Summer 2018 issue of the Illustrator Magazine has an illustrated article on Balkanyi's work and the exhibition at the Leicester Print Workshop, written by the curator Sarah Kirby.

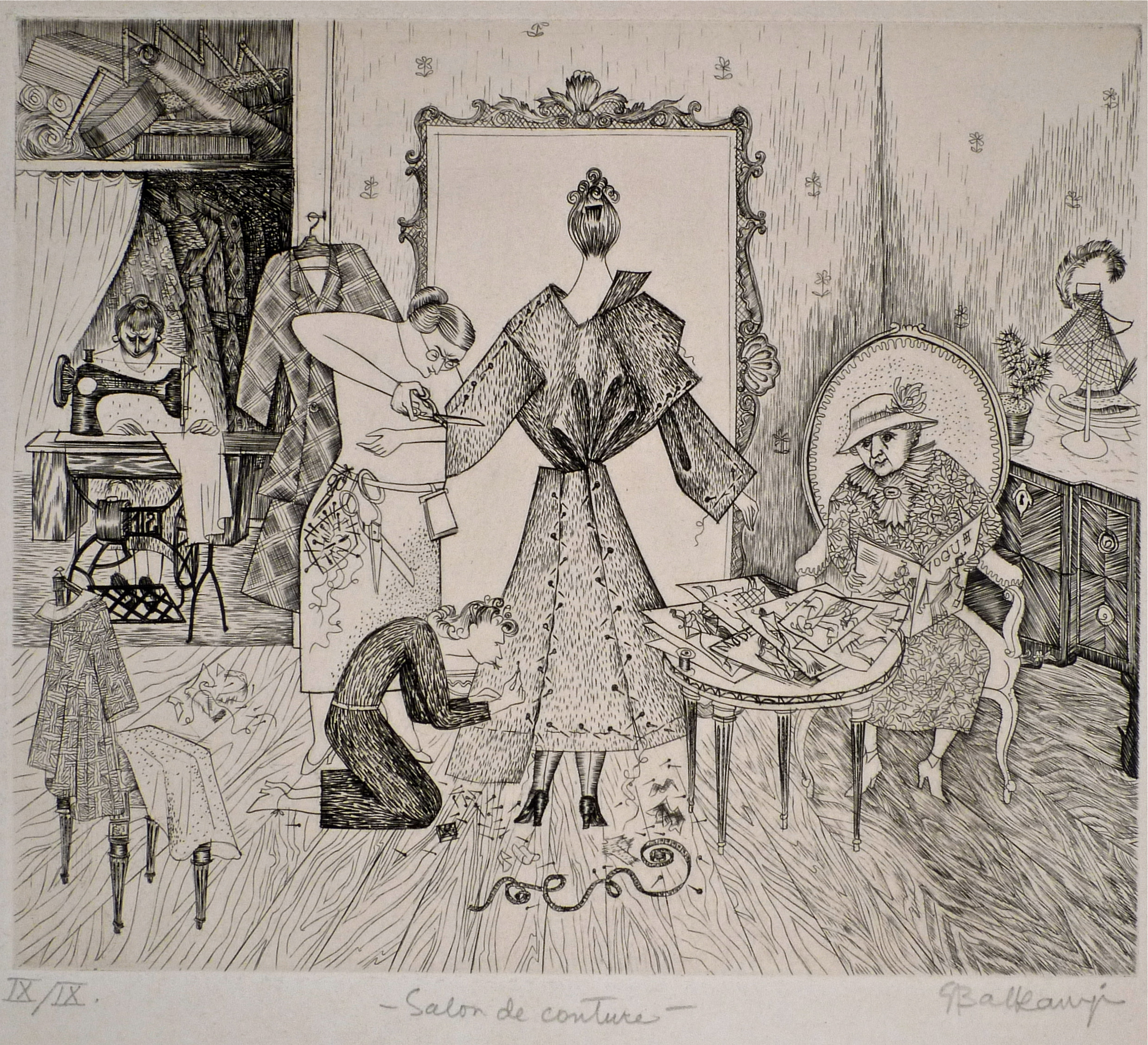
Suzanne Balkanyi, Le salon de couture, 1959

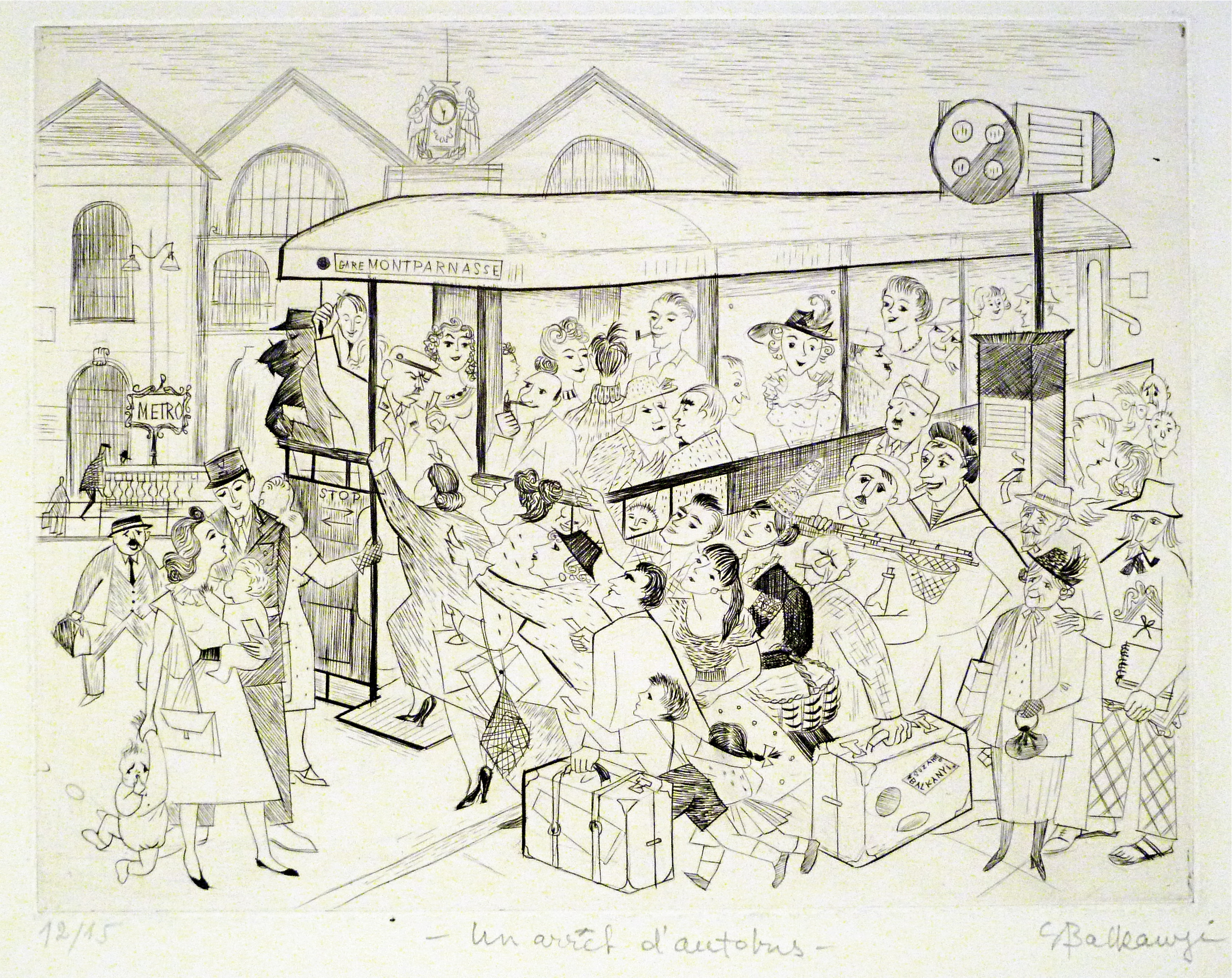
Suzanne Balkanyi, Un arrêt d'autobus (1952 ?)
