= Şəkər, Goychay =

Şəkər
- Municipality
- Location within Azerbaijan
- Coordinates: 40°34′27″N 47°52′47″E
- Country: Azerbaijan
- Rayon: Goychay

Population
  - Total: 1,299
- Time zone: UTC+4 (AZT)
  - Summer (DST): UTC+5 (AZT)

Şəkər (also spelled as Sheker, also transliterated as Шәкәр and شكر) is a village and municipality in Goychay Rayon of Azerbaijan. It has a current population of 1,299 people.
