= Carol service =

Service held in the weeks leading up to Christmas

Most churches in the United Kingdom and Ireland hold carol services in the weeks leading up to Christmas. The service usually consists of hymns about Christmas and readings from the gospels telling the Christmas story. Many candles are lit around the church and sometimes the congregation holds candles to see by.

A carol service is the name for a Christmas church service. In schools, services are held in the last week of the term. They are often held in a local church or cathedral with parents attending. A nativity play is often performed at carol services for primary schools, the birth of Jesus is usually told through readings from the Bible in schools for older children. Christmas carols are sung by the students, who practice for the event during classes in December.

A traditional form of carol service (although not used by everyone) is Nine Lessons and Carols.
