= Nicholas Sekers =

Sir Nicholas Thomas Sekers MBE
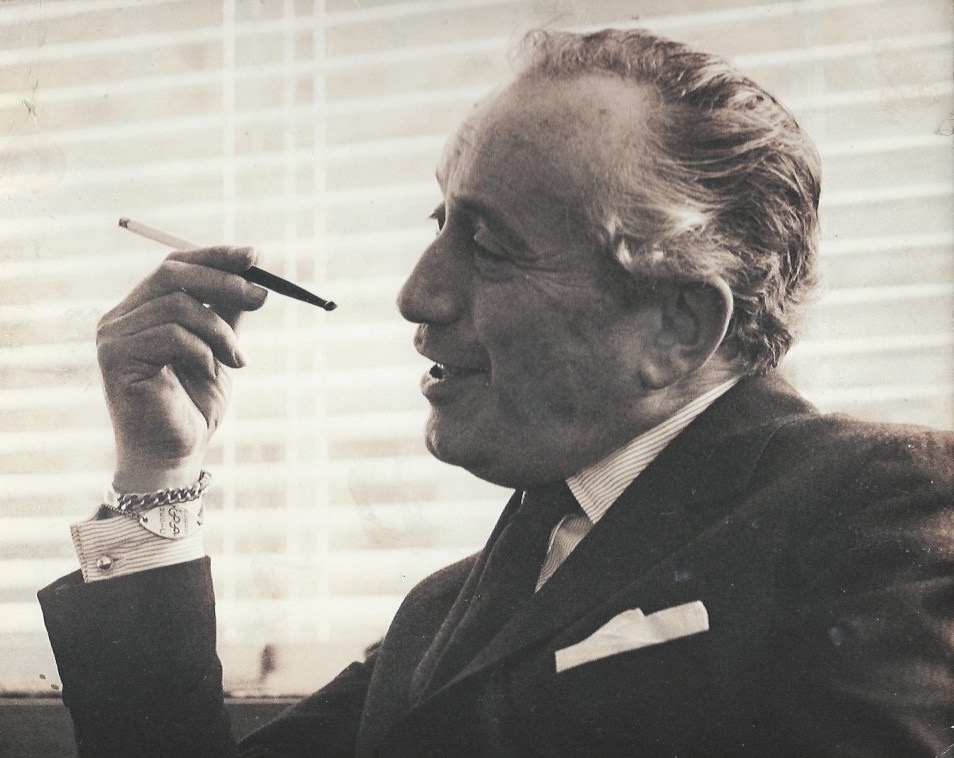
- Sekers circa 1962
- Born: Miklós Szekeres; 12 December 1910; Sopron, Hungary
- Died: 23 June 1972 (aged 61); Yugoslavia
- Other names: "Miki"
- Occupations: Businessman; Industrialist
- Known for: Sekers Fabrics
- Spouse: Agota Anna Balkanyi
- Children: 3, including David Sekers
- Relatives: Suzanne Balkanyi (sister-in-law)

Sir Nicholas Thomas "Miki" Sekers MBE (born Miklós Szekeres, 12 December 1910 – 23 June 1972) was a British-based industrialist who, with his cousin, founded Sekers Fabrics. He was also a patron of the arts.

== Early life ==
He was born Miklós Szekeres on 12 December 1910 in Sopron, Hungary. He trained in textile technology in Krefeld, Germany.

== Career ==
At the invitation of John Adams (later Lord Adams) who was charged with overcoming the 50% unemployment from which West Cumberland was suffering at the time, Sekers, who was Jewish, arrived in Britain from Hungary in 1937 with his cousin, Tomi de Gara, to establish West Cumberland Silk Mills at Richmond Hill, Hensingham, West Cumberland, in 1938. During World War II West Cumberland Silk Mills was required to make parachute silk. When supplies of silk ran low, and the new experimental product nylon was introduced as a replacement, Sekers began experimenting with the new synthetic fabric, seeing its potential for dressmaking. An introduction to Christian Dior led to Sekers producing fabrics for him and many others in the field of Dior's ready-to-wear. In the 1960s, Sekers began to design and produce furnishing fabrics. In 1962 he was awarded the Duke of Edinburgh's Award for Elegant Design (now known as the Prince Philip Designers Prize).

== Patron of the Arts ==
He sat on the boards of Glyndeborne, the Royal Opera House, London Philharmonic Orchestra, the London Mozart Players and the Royal Shakespeare Company, and was an early supporter of the painter Percy Kelly. He was an early patron of the portrait painter Judy Cassab and commissioned work by Oliver Messel, Graham Sutherland, John Piper and Suzanne Balkanyi. Sekers established and endowed a trust to convert a barn at his home at Rosehill, Whitehaven, into the Rosehill Theatre.

== Personal life ==
He was married to Agota Anna Balkanyi. In 2008, an "extremely rare costume by Christian Dior", entitled Zemire, and the centrepiece of the Dior 1954 autumn/winter collection was spotted in a Paris auction. It was discovered to have been commissioned by Agota Sekers.

They had three children: Christine, born 1942, who married Jean Baudrand, the son of a textile manufacturer in Lyons; David Sekers born 1943, who married Simone Caplat, daughter of Moran Caplat, the general manager of Glyndebourne; and Alan, born 1947, who worked in film production.

He appeared as a castaway on the BBC Radio programme Desert Island Discs on 22 April 1968.

He was made a Member of the Order of the British Empire (MBE) in the 1955 New Year Honours for services to the fashion industry, and was knighted in the 1965 New Year Honours for services to the arts.

Sekers died on 23 June 1972, in Yugoslavia, following a heart attack while on holiday there.

== Legacy ==
His portrait, a 1969 photograph by Godfrey Argent is in the National Portrait Gallery.
