= Şeker =

Şeker is a Turkish surname. Notable people with the surname include:

== Given name ==
- Şeker Ahmet Paşa, Turkish painter

== Surname ==
- Alişan Şeker (born 1986), Turkish footballer
- Busem Şeker (born 1998), Turkish-German women's footballer
- Reyhan Şeker (born 1984), Turkish women's footballer
