= David Sekers =

British historian

- Born: David Nicholas Oliver Sekers; 1943 (age 82–83)
- Education: Worcester College, Oxford
- Occupation: Historian
- Spouse: Simone Caplat
- Parent: Nicholas Sekers
- Relatives: Moran Caplat (father-in-law)

David Nicholas Oliver Sekers OBE (born 29 September 1943) is a British historian.

== Early life ==
He was born in 1943, the son of the Hungarian industrialist, Sir Nicholas Sekers, and his wife, Agota.

He attended Eton College, where he was a pupil in the house run by Nigel Wykes, and then Worcester College, Oxford.

== Career ==
For the Channel 4 programme The Mill, he was the historical consultant. Since 2005 he has been an advisor to the Department for Culture, Media and Sport (DCMS) Culture, Media and Sport Committee. He has carried out consultancy work for the Heritage Lottery Fund (HLF).

=== National Trust ===
From 1989-98 he was Director of the Southern Region of the National Trust. From 1998-2001 he was Director of the Regions of the National Trust.

== Personal life ==
In 1965, he married Simone Caplat, daughter of Moran Caplat, the general manager of Glyndebourne. She is a trustee of the Landmark Trust.

Sekers was made an Officer of the Order of the British Empire (OBE) in the 1986 New Year Honours.

He was a director of Quarry Bank Museum.

== See also ==
- English Heritage
- Category:History of the textile industry
- Category:Industrial history of the United Kingdom
