= Hovingham Hall =

Country house in North Yorkshire, England

Coordinates: 54.172318°N 0.980869°W

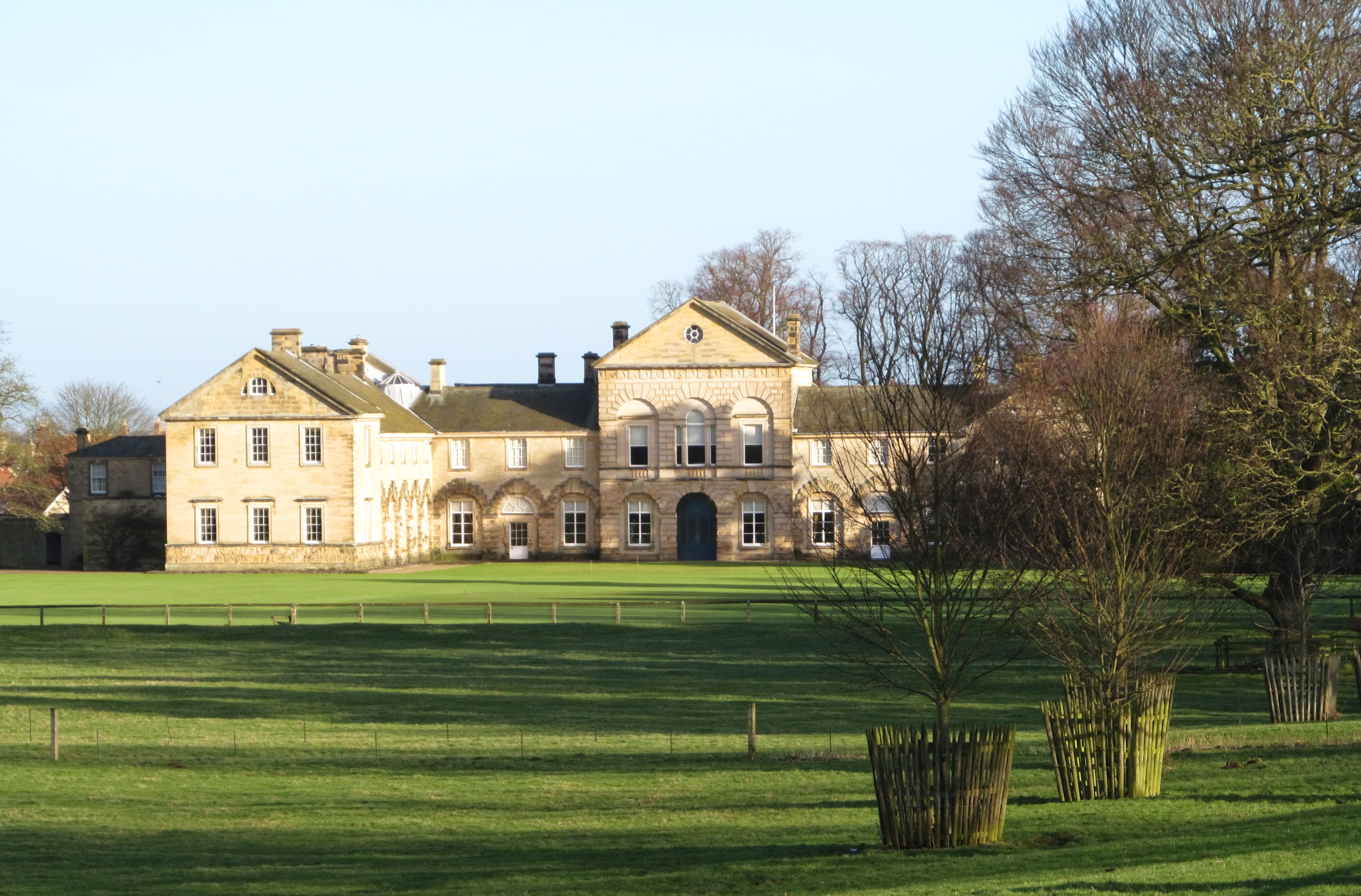
Garden facade

Hovingham Hall is a country house built in the Palladian style in the village of Hovingham, North Yorkshire, England. It has been the seat of the Worsley family and the childhood home of the Duchess of Kent. It was built in the 18th century on a site the Worsleys have occupied since the 16th century.

It is built of limestone ashlar with Westmoreland slate roofs to an L-shaped floor plan. An attached stable wing forms the main entrance. The hall is Grade I listed on the National Heritage List for England. A Tuscan temple and the ornamental bridge over a waterfall in the grounds of the hall are both listed Grade II. The wall to the north and the east of the hall and a pigeoncote to the north are both also Grade II listed.

== History ==
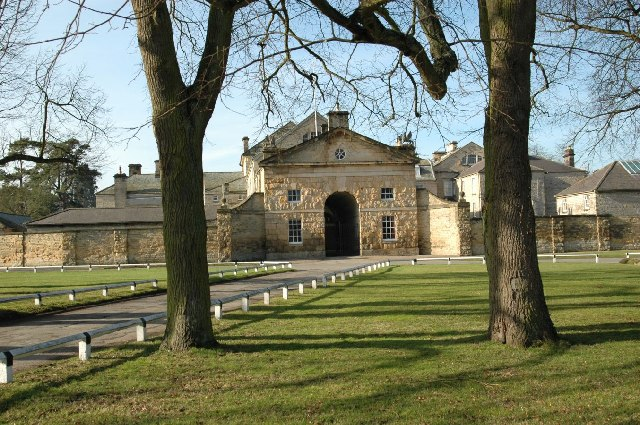
Hovingham Hall, 2006

The Worsley family bought Hovingham manor in 1563. The present house was built between 1750 and 1774 by Thomas Worsley VI (1710–1778), who was Surveyor-General to the Board of Works under George III, and designed the building himself. Unusually, it was developed around the existing stable block, which now forms the main entrance (see picture) and once housed a Riding School where Thomas taught George III to ride. Thomas was Whig MP for Orford from 1761 to 1768 and for Callington from 1768 to 1774. He was succeeded by his son Edward and he in turn in 1830 by his nephew William (1792–1879) who in 1838 was made first Baronet Worsley of Hovingham.

In front of the house is a cricket pitch, possibly the oldest private pitch in England. Colonel Sir William Worsley, 4th Baronet, was the captain of Yorkshire County Cricket Club in 1928 and 1929. He was also Lord Lieutenant of the North Riding of Yorkshire from 1951 to 1965. He was succeeded by his son Sir Marcus Worsley, 5th Baronet (1925–2012), who was MP for Keighley and Chelsea, and Lord Lieutenant of North Yorkshire and High Sheriff of North Yorkshire for 1982–1983. The 5th Baronet's younger sister was Katharine Lucy Mary Worsley, who became The Duchess of Kent.

The Hovingham Festival was founded by Canon Hudson in 1887 and held in the Hovingham Hall riding school. Thirteen festivals were held until 1906. The event was revived after 45 years during the 1950s.

The house is presently occupied by Sir William Worsley, 6th Baronet (eldest son of the 5th Baronet), and his wife Marie-Noëlle. The house and gardens are open to the public for a limited time each year, usually four weeks in June. In June 2026 the Duchess of Kent's eldest granddaughter Lady Marina Macauley and husband Nico Macauley celebrated their wedding reception at Hovingham Hall.

== See also ==
- Grade I listed buildings in North Yorkshire (district)
- Listed buildings in Hovingham
- Worsley baronets
- Sir William Worsley, 4th Baronet
- Sir Marcus Worsley, 5th Baronet
- Sir William Worsley, 6th Baronet
- Giles Worsley
