= Skipton Building Society =

Financial institution in England

- Type: Building society, (mutual)
- Industry: Financial services
- Founded: 1 May 1853 (Skipton); 1845 (Chesham)
- Headquarters: Skipton, England, UK
- Number of locations: 82 (excluding Connells)
- Area served: United Kingdom
- Key people: Gwyn Burr (chair); Stuart Haire (group chief executive)
- Products: Mortgages, savings, investments, insurance
- Revenue: ▼£1,935.7 million (2025)
- Operating income: ▼£275.2 million (2025)
- Net income: ▼£209.0 million (2025)
- Total assets: ▲£40,744.2 million (2025)
- Total equity: ▲£2,528.1 million (2025)
- Number of employees: 2,575 (2025)
- Website: Official website

The Skipton Building Society is a building society established in 1853 in Skipton, England, where it remains headquartered. It has 82 branches and its subsidiary, Connells Group, has over 1,200 branches.

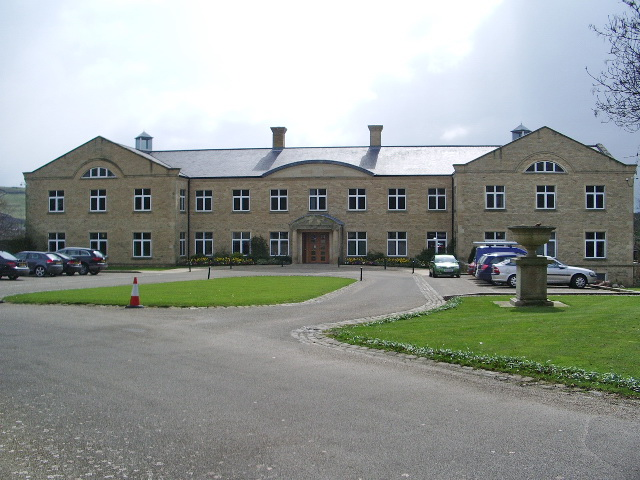
The Bailey, headquarters of the building society.

== History ==
=== The First Hundred Years ===
The inaugural meeting of the Skipton Building Society took place in the Town Hall in May 1853. The initiative came from George Kendall, then a 23-year-old timber merchant, described as “a prominent Skipton townsman”. Kendall's motivation appeared to be the advantage a building society would bring to the district and he sought out other local dignitaries in support. After the first Secretary's short tenure, Samuel Farey was appointed to the position. At the time, Farey was a 30-year-old schoolteacher although in later years he became a substantial mill owner. The Centenary brochure credited Farey with laying “the firm foundation upon which the structure has been built”. Farey was the first of three long-serving Secretaries spanning the Society's first hundred years. The third was Arthur Smith, appointed in 1915 and still in office in 1953; it was he who developed the Skipton into more than a one office, local society.

The Society's foundations may have been firm but the structure remained modest.: fifty years from its foundation, the assets were no more than £82,000. By the time of Arthur Smith's appointment in the early years of WWI the assets stood at £126,000 and this had risen to £273,000 in 1922. The Society was then looking for fresh outlets for its funds and it opened agencies in Nelson, Blackpool and Lytham. The model for the Skipton's regional growth was to be agencies rather than branches and more were appointed; Skipton even began operating in London in 1929, the year in which assets passed £1m. Serving the growing business, a new office was opened in 1928, the ceremony being performed by the then Chancellor of the Exchequer.

The centenary came 25 years after the opening of what had become the head office. In that time, the Society had made one small acquisition, the Barnoldswick & District Permanent in 1942; however, it had substantially increased it agencies. The 1953 brochure listed 35 agencies, primarily in Lancashire and Yorkshire; sitting oddly with that regional concentration were the southern agencies in Hampton-upon-Thames, Wembley and Worthing. There were also four branches but their modest importance was indicated by the fact that only Harrogate was open daily – Cowling was only open once a month. The Skipton's assets were now £11.7m compared with £126,000 when Arthur Smith had been appointed. An indication of the relative size of the Society four years after its centenary, was given by Seymour Price. Of those permanent societies formed in the first decade of their existence (1846–56), the Skipton now ranked number 16.

=== The Modern Era ===
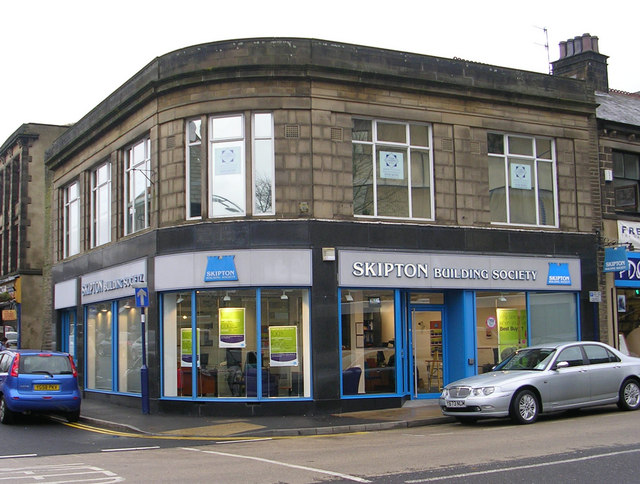
Skipton Building Society, Bingley.

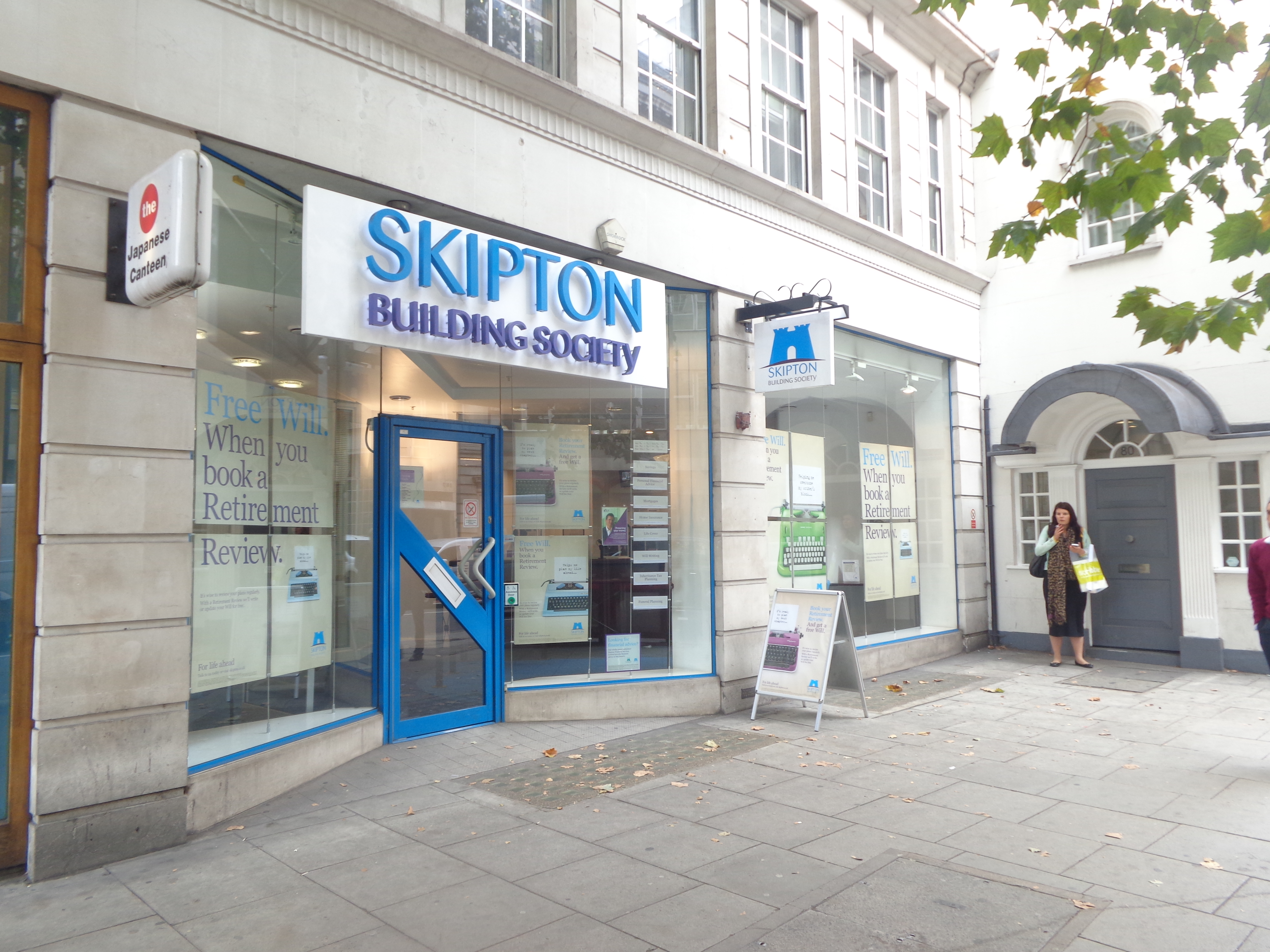
Skipton Building Society, High Holborn, London.

The Skipton gradually changed its emphasis from agencies to branches and, augmented by the acquisition of the Ribblesdale Permanent in 1966 and the Bury in 1974, assets grew substantially. By 1974 they had reached £100m. and then £150m. three years later. In 1978, a five-storey extension to the rear of the High Street Head Office is built, to house over 200 staff. It occupies part of the site where the first office opened in 1853 (in Providence Place). The society now has 88 branches and 75 agencies throughout the UK, holding more than 125,000 accounts. The Bailey, the Society's modern new premises on Harrogate Road, Skipton was built in 1990.

John Goodfellow was appointed chief executive in 1991 and on his retirement in 2008, was described as “the architect of the Society’s diversification which has differentiated Skipton from other societies”. The most successful purchase, and one of the few to survive, was the estate agents Connells Group, bought in 1996. Continued physical expansion of the traditional mortgage business, combined with inflation, took group assets up to £13.6 billion from 85 society branches and 472 estate agency branches.

Coincidentally, Goodfellow's departure in 2008 was the year of the credit crunch. Profits fell from £164m. to £22m. and it was only the strength of Connells’ trading that kept the group total positive. However, Skipton's financial base remained strong and it was able to rescue the Scarborough Building Society in 2009 and the Chesham Building Society (then the oldest society in existence) in 2010; by the following year the Skipton had over 100 branches. By 2014 assets were growing again but strategy had changed. The structure was simplified, subsidiaries were sold and the Skipton was now based on its core mortgage business with support from Connells. Assets grew from £16 billion in 2014 to £28 billion in 2020: Skipton was firmly established as the UK's fourth largest building society.

== Controversies ==
In 2008 the former CEO, John Goodfellow received £781,000 as compensation for loss of office: Skipton waived any early retirement discount factors applicable to his benefits in the scheme, enabling him to access his £2.3 million pension pot from 10 January 2010 with no penalty.

When Skipton announced it was taking over the Scarborough Building Society in November 2008, society chiefs told staff no jobs would be lost compulsorily in the process. But just months later, 30 Scarborough jobs were lost when the societies merged and it announced on 27 January 2010 that a further 90 job losses were in the pipeline.

Skipton reneged on its promise to keep the SVR tracker no more than 3% per annum above base rate, citing an "exceptional circumstances" clause in their agreement, potentially putting thousands of borrowers out of pocket. On 4 March 2009 Skipton CEO reiterated that Skipton had made the 3% pledge and would keep it.

Skipton suffered a serious breach of data security in 2009 when over 3,000 savers received financial details of other customers. When Skipton mailed 108,000 account statements to savers on the weekend of 23–24 January 2010, 3,115 went out with the name, account number, balance and interest earned in the previous year of different customers printed on the reverse of the letters. This followed an Information Commissioner's Office finding, in 2008, that Skipton was in breach of the Data Protection Act, following the theft of an unencrypted laptop left by a third party contractor at a gym. The unprotected information lost included names, dates of birth, National Insurance numbers and investment amounts of 14,000 customers.

Skipton Building Society was featured in the "In The Back" section of Private Eye in June 2005, accused of failing to disclose a £30 million loss at CallCredit PLC, a subsidiary company, and the purchase of a £3.5 million core IT system from a loss-making IT company which it subsequently had to rescue at the cost of £10 million of members' savings.
