= Scarborough Building Society =

- Company type: Building Society (Mutual)
- Industry: Banking; Financial services
- Founded: 1846
- Defunct: 30 March 2009
- Successor: Skipton Building Society
- Headquarters: Scarborough, England, UK
- Key people: John Carrier, Chief Executive
- Products: Savings, Mortgages, Investments, Insurance, Financial Planning
- Net income: £6.5 million GBP (April 2008), 36.7% on 2007
- Total assets: £2.9 billion GBP (April 2008), 24.1% on 2007

Scarborough Building Society was a UK building society, which had its headquarters in Scarborough, North Yorkshire, England. It was a member of the Building Societies Association. On 30 March 2009 the building society merged with the Skipton Building Society and subsequently operated under the Skipton brand.

== History ==
Prospect House (Head Office)

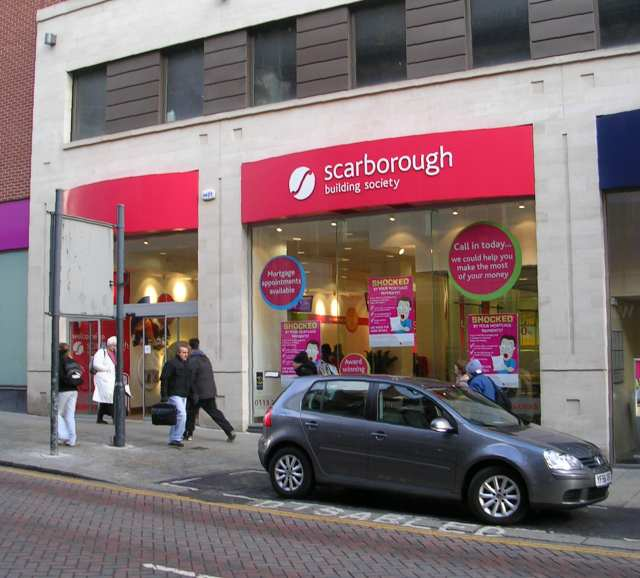
A branch of the Scarborough on Albion Street in Leeds. This branch is now a Skipton.

The Society was founded as The Scarborough and North and East Yorkshire Permanent Building and Investment Society in May 1846.

In November 2008, its assets exceeded £2.8 billion, making it the 17th largest building society in the UK.

Due to "difficult trading conditions", the Scarborough Building Society approached the Skipton Building Society, which agreed to a merger under the Skipton brand, in late 2008.
