= Future Talent =

United Kingdom-based charity

- Formation: 2004; 22 years ago
- Founder: Katharine, Duchess of Kent; Nicholas Robinson
- Type: Charity
- Purpose: Nurturing young musical talent
- Location(s): Chester House CH3.24 Kennington Park 1-3 Brixton Road London SW9 6DE
- Region served: United Kingdom
- Website: www.futuretalent.org

Future Talent is a United Kingdom-based charity launched in 2004 by Katharine, Duchess of Kent and Nicholas Robinson.

== History ==
The Duchess of Kent founded Future Talent in 2004. After stepping back from royal duties in 1996, she spent 13 years teaching music anonymously at a primary school in Kingston upon Hull, using the name "Mrs Kent" so that only the headteacher knew her true identity. It was in this classroom environment that she encountered talented children held back by financial constraints and a lack of support—an experience that in her words profoundly moved her. Inspired by this and her love for music, she co‑founded Future Talent with Nicholas Robinson to give gifted young musicians from low‑income backgrounds a chance through instrumental funding, lessons, masterclasses, mentoring, and performance opportunities.

The charity provides not only financial awards but also mentoring, workshops, masterclasses, and performance opportunities to help talented young musicians thrive, even partnerships with figures like Sting as patrons. A BBC Radio 4 appeal broadcast in early 2024 (presented by ambassador Alexander Armstrong) raised nearly £50,000 for Future Talent, enabling the charity to support 24 young musicians for an entire year. The funding covers mentoring, workshops, performance opportunities, and up to £2,000 per musician for musical costs. Honouring Katharine's 91st birthday in 2024, the charity partnered with the National Children's Choir of Great Britain to launch a scholarship enabling a singer from a low‑income background to attend residential programs, receive mentorship, and gain performance experience.
