= Sir William Worsley, 4th Baronet =

English cricketer and landowner

Colonel Sir William Worsley Bt
- Born: William Arthington Worsley; 5 April 1890; Hovingham Hall, Yorkshire, England
- Died: 4 December 1973 (aged 83); Hovingham Hall, Yorkshire
- Spouse: Joyce Morgan Brunner
- Children: Sir Marcus Worsley, 5th Bt; Oliver Worsley; John Worsley; Katharine, Duchess of Kent
- Parent(s): Sir William Worsley, 3rd Baronet; Augusta Mary Chivers Bower

Col. Sir William Arthington Worsley, 4th Baronet (5 April 1890 – 4 December 1973), was an English landowner and amateur first-class cricketer.

== Biography ==
Worsley was born at Hovingham Hall, Yorkshire, England, the son of Sir William Henry Arthington Worsley of Hovingham, 3rd Baronet, and his wife, Lady Augusta Mary (née Chivers Bower).

Worsley attended Ludgrove School and Eton College. He served as a lieutenant and subsequently captain with the Green Howards (now part of the Yorkshire Regiment) in World War I. He was wounded and taken prisoner.

Worsley was Lord Lieutenant of the North Riding of Yorkshire from 1951 to 1965.

In 1967, Worsley was awarded an honorary LLD by the University of Leeds. The degree was conferred on him by his daughter in her role as Chancellor of the university.

== Marriage and children ==
Worsley married Joyce Morgan Brunner, daughter of Sir John Brunner, 2nd Baronet, and his wife Lucy Marianne Vaughan Morgan, on 20 May 1924 at St. Margaret's, Westminster. They had four children:

- Sir (William) Marcus John Worsley, 5th Baronet (6 April 1925 – 18 December 2012)
- (George) Oliver Worsley (22 February 1927 – 30 November 2010), married Penelope Susanne Fleetwood Fuller (granddaughter of Sir John Fuller, 1st Baronet)
- John Arthington Worsley (15 July 1928 – 2 March 2022), married Hon. Carolyn Mary Wynyard Hardinge (daughter of Caryl Hardinge, 4th Viscount Hardinge)
- Katharine Lucy Mary Worsley (22 February 1933 – 4 September 2025), married Prince Edward, Duke of Kent, thereby becoming Duchess of Kent.

== Cricketer ==
He captained Yorkshire County Cricket Club in 1928 and 1929, his only seasons of first-class cricket. He had been unable to accept the captaincy in 1924 due to business commitments.

Worsley followed Major Arthur Lupton as captain, but only accepted the position after the Yorkshire committee had initially offered Herbert Sutcliffe the captaincy. Sutcliffe refused the offer after controversy broke out over the decision. The county lost only twice whilst Worsley was captain. He was awarded his county cap in 1928.

A right-handed batsman, he scored 722 runs at 15.69, with a highest score of 60 against Hampshire, and took 32 catches in the field. His great-uncle, George Cayley, played four games for the Marylebone Cricket Club (MCC) and Cambridge University.

He was President of Yorkshire County Cricket Club from 1960, until his death in 1973; and was President of the MCC in 1962.

Baronetage of the United Kingdom
Preceded by William Worsley	Baronet of Hovingham Hall; 1936–1973	Succeeded by Marcus Worsley
Honorary titles
Preceded by The Marquess of Zetland	Lord Lieutenant of the North Riding of Yorkshire; 1951–1965	Succeeded by The Marquess of Normanby
