= Lord Lieutenant of the North Riding of Yorkshire =

Civil post in England

The post of Lord Lieutenant of the North Riding of Yorkshire was created in 1660, at the Restoration. It was abolished on 31 March 1974, and replaced with the office of Lord Lieutenant of North Yorkshire. From 1782 until 1974, all Lords Lieutenant were also Custos Rotulorum of the North Riding of Yorkshire.

== Lord Lieutenants of the North Riding of Yorkshire to 1974 ==
- Thomas Belasyse, 2nd Viscount Fauconberg 27 July 1660 – 19 November 1687
- Charles Fairfax, 5th Viscount Fairfax of Emley 19 November 1687 – 5 October 1688
- Henry Cavendish, 2nd Duke of Newcastle-upon-Tyne 5 October 1688 – 28 March 1689
- Thomas Belasyse, 1st Earl Fauconberg 28 March 1689 – 4 April 1692
- Thomas Osborne, 1st Duke of Leeds 4 April 1692 – 23 September 1699
- Arthur Ingram, 3rd Viscount of Irvine 23 September 1699 – 21 June 1702
- John Sheffield, 1st Duke of Buckingham and Normanby 11 June 1702 – 16 April 1705
- John Holles, 1st Duke of Newcastle-upon-Tyne 16 April 1705 – 15 July 1711
- John Sheffield, 1st Duke of Buckingham and Normanby 19 September 1711 – 27 December 1714
- Robert Darcy, 3rd Earl of Holderness 27 December 1714 – 20 January 1721
- Sir Conyers Darcy 7 March 1722 – 31 May 1740
- Robert Darcy, 4th Earl of Holderness 31 May 1740 – 6 February 1778
- Henry Belasyse, 2nd Earl Fauconberg 6 February 1778 – 23 March 1802
- George Osborne, 6th Duke of Leeds 10 April 1802 – 10 July 1838
- Thomas Dundas, 2nd Earl of Zetland 28 July 1838 – 6 May 1873
- George Robinson, 1st Marquess of Ripon 21 March 1873 – 4 May 1906
- Sir Hugh Bell, 2nd Baronet 4 May 1906 – 29 June 1931
- Geoffrey Howard 21 September 1931 – 20 June 1935
- William Orde-Powlett, 5th Baron Bolton 19 July 1935 – 11 December 1944
- Lawrence Dundas, 2nd Marquess of Zetland 28 February 1945 – 12 June 1951
- Sir William Worsley, 4th Baronet 12 June 1951 – 15 June 1965
- Oswald Phipps, 4th Marquess of Normanby 15 June 1965 – 31 March 1974†

†Became Lord Lieutenant of North Yorkshire.

== Deputy lieutenants ==
A deputy lieutenant of the North Riding of Yorkshire was commissioned by the Lord Lieutenant of the North Riding of Yorkshire. Deputy lieutenants support the work of the lord-lieutenant. There can be several deputy lieutenants at any time, depending on the population of the county. Their appointment does not terminate with the changing of the lord-lieutenant, but they usually retire at age 75.

=== 19th century ===
- August 1852: Christopher Cradock
