= Alişan Şeker =

Turkish footballer (born 1986)

Personal information
- Full name: Alişan Şeker
- Date of birth: 4 July 1986 (age 40)
- Place of birth: Bartın, Turkey
- Position: Goalkeeper

Team information
- Current team: Iğdır FK
- Number: 74

Youth career
- 1999–2003: Kemerspor
- 2003–2004: Türk Telekom

Senior career*
Years	Team	Apps	(Gls)
2004–2009	Türk Telekom	70	(0)
2009–2011	Sivasspor	3	(0)
2011–2013	Kırklarelispor	56	(0)
2013–2015	Orduspor	27	(0)
2015	Kırklarelispor	14	(0)
2015–2017	Alanyaspor	1	(0)
2017–2018	Kırklarelispor	32	(0)
2018–2020	Bayburt Özel İdarespor	56	(0)
2020–2021	Sakaryaspor	5	(0)
2021–	Iğdır FK	1	(0)

International career
2006	Turkey U20	1	(0)
- * Club domestic league appearances and goals as of 5 September 2021

Alişan Şeker (born 4 July 1986) is a Turkish professional footballer who plays as a goalkeeper for Iğdır FK. He has also been capped at the U-20 level for Turkey.

== Club career ==
Şeker began his career with Kemerspor in 1999. He was transferred to Türk Telekom Gençlik Spor Kulübü in 2003. Sivasspor transferred him at the beginning of the 2009–10 season.
