= Katharine, Duchess of Kent =

Member of the British royal family (1933–2025)

Katharine
- Duchess of Kent (more)
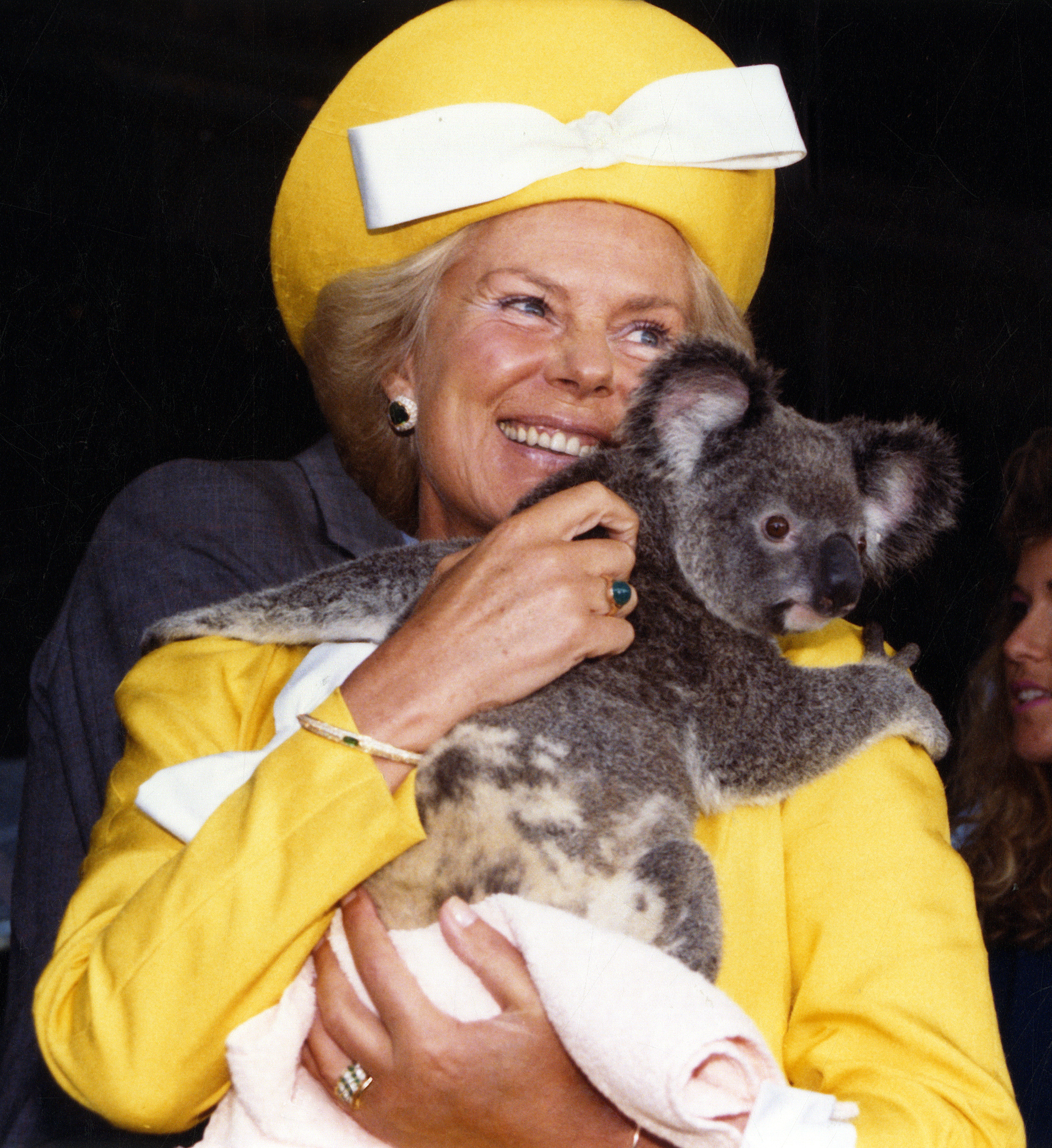
- Katharine with a koala at Expo 88, 1988
- Born: Katharine Lucy Mary Worsley; 22 February 1933; Hovingham Hall, North Riding of Yorkshire, England
- Died: 4 September 2025 (aged 92); Kensington Palace, London, England
- Burial: 16 September 2025; Royal Burial Ground, Frogmore
- Spouse: Prince Edward, Duke of Kent (m. 1961)
- Issue more...: George Windsor, Earl of St Andrews; Lady Helen Taylor; Lord Nicholas Windsor
- House: Worsley (by birth); Windsor (by marriage)
- Father: Sir William Worsley, 4th Baronet
- Mother: Joyce Morgan Brunner
- Religion: Catholic Church (previously Church of England)

Katharine, Duchess of Kent (born Katharine Lucy Mary Worsley; 22 February 1933 – 4 September 2025), was a member of the British royal family. She was the wife of Prince Edward, Duke of Kent, a grandson of King George V.

Katharine converted to Catholicism in 1994, becoming one of the few members of the royal family to convert since the passing of the Act of Settlement 1701. For over three decades, she was a familiar presence at Wimbledon, where she presented the Ladies' Singles Trophy and became known for her warmth and compassion. A lifelong supporter of music, she performed with several choirs and held honorary roles in musical organisations. In later years, she taught music at a primary school in Kingston upon Hull, where she was known simply as "Mrs Kent", and in 2004 co-founded the charity Future Talent to support musically gifted children from disadvantaged backgrounds.

Following the death of Queen Elizabeth II on 8 September 2022, Katharine became the oldest living member of the British royal family, until her own death. Her funeral marked the first royal Catholic funeral in the United Kingdom in modern history.

== Early life and education ==
Katharine Lucy Mary Worsley was born on 22 February 1933 at Hovingham Hall, Yorkshire, the fourth child and only daughter of Sir William Worsley, 4th Baronet (1890−1973), Lord-lieutenant of North Riding, and his wife Joyce Morgan Brunner (1895–1979). Her mother was the only daughter of Sir John Brunner, 2nd Baronet, and granddaughter of Sir John Brunner, 1st Baronet, co-founder of Brunner Mond – one of the four companies that merged in 1926 to form Imperial Chemical Industries. She was a descendant of Oliver Cromwell through his youngest daughter Frances, Lady Russel. Worsley was baptised at All Saints' Church, Hovingham, on 2 April 1933. Her godparents were her maternal uncle Sir Felix Brunner, 3rd Baronet, Major Sir Digby Lawson, 2nd Baronet, her paternal aunt Lady Colegate, and Margaret D'Arcy Fife of Nunnington Hall.

Worsley received no formal education until she was 10. She was educated at Queen Margaret's School, York, and at Runton Hill School in North Norfolk. While in the sixth form there, she took science lessons at Gresham's School. At school, she was introduced to music, and was taught to play the piano, organ and violin. In her final year at Runton Hill, she was formally elected music secretary; in this role, she organised school recitals in Norwich. She left school with a pass in oral French and a "very good" in English literature.

Worsley worked for some time in a children's home in York and at a nursery school in London. She failed to gain admission to the Royal Academy of Music, but followed her brothers to Oxford – where they were at the university – to study at Miss Hubler's Finishing School, 22 Merton Street, devoting much of her time to music. She was one of only eight pupils there and was instructed by three different teachers: The principal, a Miss Hubler, taught French literature, painting, and history; a French woman taught cookery; and a Viennese woman taught music.

== Marriage ==
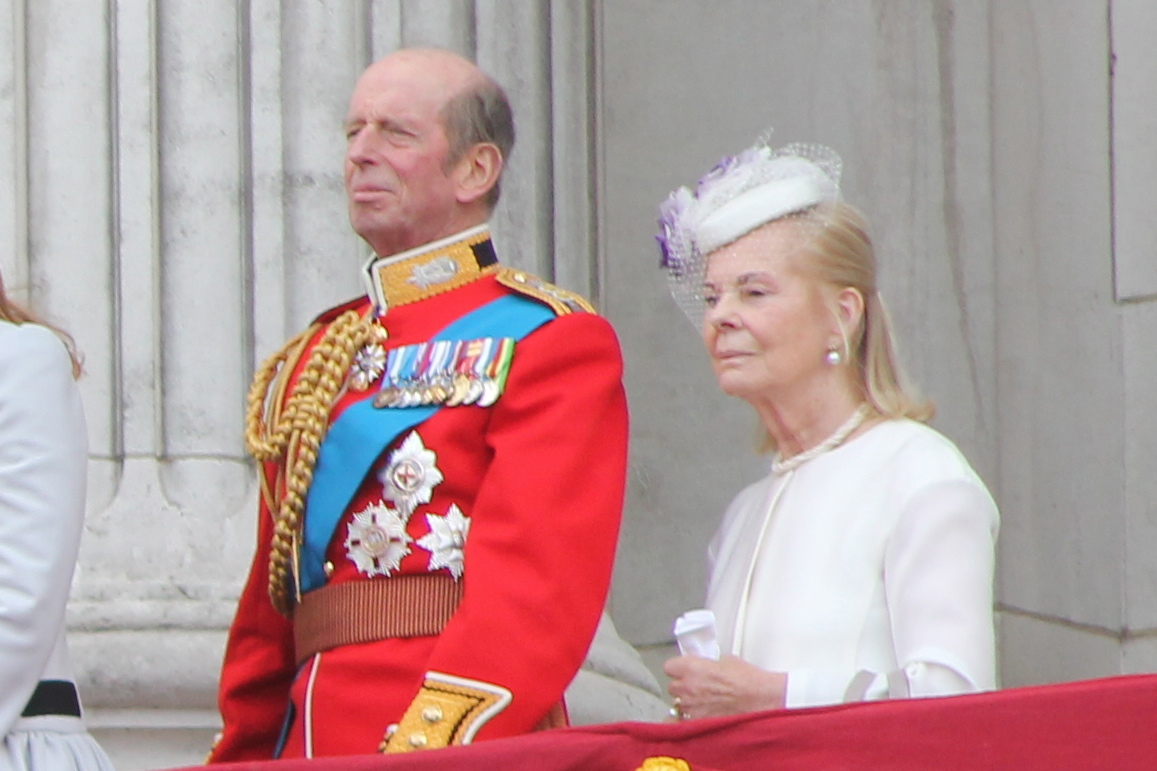
Katharine and Edward at Trooping the Colour, June 2013

Worsley met Prince Edward, Duke of Kent, the eldest son of Prince George, Duke of Kent, and Princess Marina of Greece and Denmark, while he was based at Catterick Garrison. Princess Marina reportedly disapproved of her son's choice of bride and twice forbade the match before agreeing to the marriage in 1961. On 8 June 1961, the couple married at York Minster, the first royal marriage in that location in 633 years (the last one being between Edward III and Philippa of Hainault). The bride's father escorted her, and the best man was Edward's brother Prince Michael of Kent. Princess Anne was one of the bridesmaids. The Archbishop of York, Michael Ramsey, officiated the marriage service. Guests included actors Noël Coward and Douglas Fairbanks Jr. as well as members of the British, Greek, Danish, Norwegian, Yugoslavian, Romanian, and Spanish royal families. Her white silk gauze dress was designed by John Cavanagh, used 273 yards (250 m) of fabric and had "a high neckline and long sleeves and a commanding train". The Kent Diamond and Pearl Fringe Tiara secured her veil.

They had three living children:

- George, Earl of St Andrews, born 26 June 1962 at Coppins; married Sylvana Tomaselli
- Lady Helen Taylor, born 28 April 1964 at Coppins; married Timothy Taylor
- Lord Nicholas Windsor, born 25 July 1970 at King's College Hospital in London; married, 2006, Paola Doimi de Lupis de Frankopan

Katharine had a miscarriage in 1975 owing to rubella and gave birth to a stillborn son, Patrick, in 1977; this loss sent her into a severe depression which she spoke about publicly. "It had the most devastating effect on me", she told The Daily Telegraph in 1997. "I had no idea how devastating such a thing could be to any woman. It has made me extremely understanding of others who suffer a stillbirth."

She moved to the married quarters in Hong Kong and Germany while her husband was serving with the Royal Scots Greys. The couple later took numerous royal engagements on behalf of the Queen, including the Ugandan independence celebrations and the coronation of the King of Tonga.

At the time of her death, Katharine and her husband lived at Wren House, Kensington Palace, in London. After their 1961 wedding, she and Edward moved into Coppins, where they lived until 1972. In the early 1970s, they moved to York House at St James's Palace before moving to Wren House at Kensington Palace in 1997. From 1972 to 1990, they leased Anmer Hall in Norfolk, part of the Sandringham Estate. They subsequently purchased Crocker End House in December 1989 before selling it the early 2000s. In 2002, Katharine purchased the Old Forge in Brightwell Baldwin and sold it in 2017.

== Wimbledon ==
Katharine accepted honorary membership of the All England Lawn Tennis and Croquet Club in 1962, marking the beginning of a decades-long association with Wimbledon. She was a familiar figure at the championships, presenting the Ladies' Singles Trophy from 1976 to 2001, with only three exceptions. She became widely known for her compassion during the 1993 Wimbledon women's singles final, when she comforted runner-up Jana Novotná after a defeat by Steffi Graf. The moment was praised for its sincerity and became emblematic of her public warmth. In 1999, Katharine was refused permission to seat the 12-year-old son of murdered headmaster Philip Lawrence in the Royal Box. Alternative seating outside the box was offered. She later received what The Daily Telegraph reported in a front-page story was a "curt letter" from club chairman John Curry, reminding her that children, other than members of the royal family, were not permitted in the Royal Box. In response, she reportedly threatened to boycott the box altogether. Her final presentation was to Venus Williams in 2001.

== Catholic Church ==
Katharine was formally received into the Catholic Church in January 1994, a move that drew public attention due to its rarity among members of the British royal family since the Act of Settlement 1701. (Note: Earlier royals such as Princess Victoria Eugenie of Battenberg (converted 1906) and Princess Beatrice, Duchess of Galliera (converted 1913) had also entered the Catholic Church. Both were granddaughters of Queen Victoria, but were either about to marry or had married into foreign dynasties at the time of their conversion.) This was a personal decision, and she had received the approval of the reigning monarch, Elizabeth II. As she explained in an interview on BBC:

I do love guidelines and the Catholic Church offers you guidelines. I have always wanted that in my life. I like to know what's expected of me. I like being told: You shall go to church on Sunday and if you don't you're in for it!

Although the Act of Settlement 1701 means a member of the royal family marrying a Catholic relinquishes their right of succession to the British throne, the act does not include marriage to an Anglican who subsequently becomes a Catholic. Therefore, the Duke of Kent did not lose his place in the line of succession to the British throne.

Since then, the couple's younger son, Lord Nicholas, their grandson Lord Downpatrick, and their granddaughter Lady Marina also became Catholics. Their elder son, the Earl of St Andrews, father of Lord Downpatrick, had married a Catholic and thus was barred from succession until the 2013 Succession to the Crown Act revoked his exclusion. The Dukedom of Kent is also not subject to the Act of Settlement, so Downpatrick is in line to become the Duke of Kent.

== Later years and activities ==
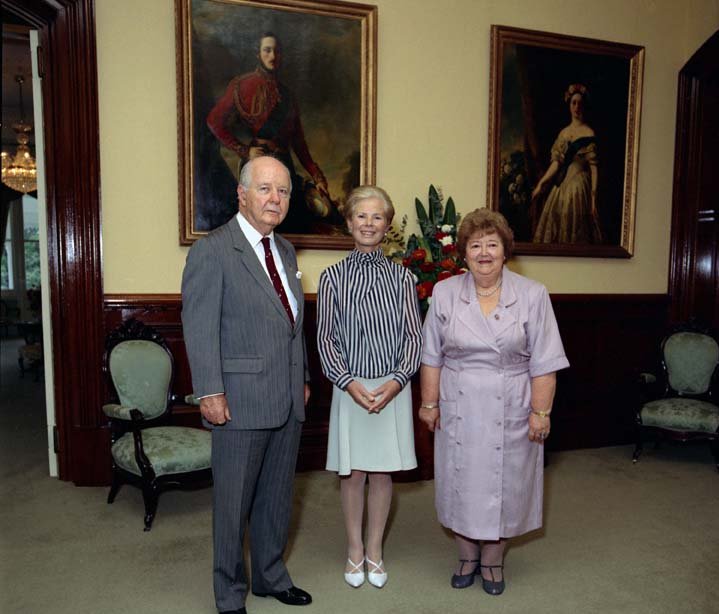
Katharine with Sir Walter Campbell and Lady Campbell in Brisbane, 1992

In 1978, Katharine was hospitalised for several weeks owing to "nervous strain". Reports by the BBC stated that she suffered from coeliac disease and Epstein–Barr virus, whose symptoms resemble those of ME (myalgic encephalomyelitis, also known as "chronic fatigue syndrome").

In December 1989, Katharine was a guest on the BBC Radio 4 programme Desert Island Discs, choosing Mozart's Ave verum corpus (sung by the Swedish Radio Choir with the Berlin Philharmonic), seven other pieces of music, a DIY manual, and a lamp with solar batteries as her favourite song, book and luxury item respectively. In 1996, Katharine took a position as a music teacher at Wansbeck Primary School in Kingston upon Hull. Known to staff and pupils as "Mrs Kent", she taught there for many years, maintaining a low profile and allowing her royal identity to remain largely unrecognised within the school community. She also gave piano lessons in a rented studio flat near her official residence at Kensington Palace. She had served as the president of the Royal Northern College of Music, and was the director of National Foundation for Youth Music from 1999 to 2007. In March 2004, Katharine was the subject of Real Story on BBC One. She talked about her career as a music teacher saying "teaching [the children] is very satisfying. It's a privilege. To me it's one of the most exciting jobs anyone can do." In 2005, Katharine spoke in an interview on BBC Radio 3 of her liking of rap music and of the singer-songwriter Dido, whose song "Thank You" she chose as one of her favourite pieces of music. She was one of the co-founders of Future Talent, a UK-based charity established in 2004 to support gifted young musicians from low-income backgrounds. Inspired by her years teaching music in Hull, she partnered with Nicholas Robinson to provide financial awards, mentoring, masterclasses, and performance opportunities to help children pursue careers in music. She was patron of BBC Young Musician in 2004 and 2006.

She decided in 2002 not to use the style "Her Royal Highness" herself and to reduce her royal duties. From that point onward, she was informally known as Katharine Kent or Katharine, Duchess of Kent, although her formal style (e.g., in the Court Circular) remained HRH The Duchess of Kent. Despite her decision to stay away from public life, Katharine continued to appear at major events including the wedding of Prince William and Catherine Middleton in 2011, the concert at Buckingham Palace and thanksgiving service at St Paul's Cathedral during Queen Elizabeth II's Diamond Jubilee celebrations in 2012, and the wedding of Prince Harry and Meghan Markle in 2018. She did not attend Queen Elizabeth II's funeral in 2022 or the coronation of King Charles III in 2023.

In 2011, close associates of private investigator Jonathan Rees, who was linked to the News International phone hacking scandal, alleged that he had accessed the bank accounts of Katharine and her husband.

In May 2016, she hosted a concert for young children at Buckingham Palace in her capacity as founder of Future Talent. In August 2016, Katharine became an ambassador for Samaritans after a volunteer at the Teesside branch contacted her. She had previously been its royal patron from 1971 until 1999. Katharine was also a supporter of UNICEF. In 2022, she expressed her love and penchant for gangsta rap, typified by Eminem and Ice Cube.

Katharine made her final public appearance on 9 October 2024 to mark her husband's 89th birthday.

== Death and funeral ==
Katharine died at Kensington Palace on 4 September 2025, aged 92; her death was announced by Buckingham Palace the following day. Following the announcement, flags on royal residences and government buildings were lowered to half-mast, and a period of mourning was declared for the Royal Household until the day of her funeral. A book of condolence was opened on the official royal family website for members of the public to leave messages.

Her coffin lay at Kensington Palace Chapel until 15 September, when it was transferred to the Lady Chapel at Westminster Cathedral for the Reception of the Body, a Catholic rite in which the coffin is formally received into the church. A bearer party was provided by the Royal Dragoon Guards, the regiment of which she had been Deputy Colonel-in-Chief. The funeral took place the following day. A piper of the Royal Dragoon Guards played the lament Sleep, Dearie, Sleep. The requiem mass was sung to a Latin setting by Maurice Duruflé, and Mozart's motet Ave verum corpus, a favourite of Katharine's, was also performed. Cardinal Vincent Nichols, the Archbishop of Westminster, presided, and Archbishop Miguel Maury Buendía, Apostolic Nuncio to Great Britain, read a message of condolence to the King from Pope Leo XIV. The King, the Prince and Princess of Wales, and other members of the royal family attended; the Queen was absent due to illness. The funeral was the first royal Catholic funeral in the United Kingdom in modern history. Following the service, she was interred at the Royal Burial Ground, Frogmore.

== Titles, styles, honours and arms ==
=== Titles and styles ===
After her marriage, Katharine was styled "Her Royal Highness The Duchess of Kent".

=== Honours and decorations ===
==== Honours ====
- 1961: Recipient of the Royal Family Order of Elizabeth II
- 9 June 1977: Dame Grand Cross of the Royal Victorian Order (GCVO)

==== Decorations ====
- 6 February 1977: Queen Elizabeth II Silver Jubilee Medal
- 6 February 2002: Queen Elizabeth II Golden Jubilee Medal
- 6 February 2012: Queen Elizabeth II Diamond Jubilee Medal
- 6 February 2022: Queen Elizabeth II Platinum Jubilee Medal
- 6 May 2023: King Charles III Coronation Medal

==== Freedom of the City ====
- 1989: Freeman of the City of York

==== Medals ====
- 25 October 2021: The Pro Tuitio Fidei et Obsequium Pauperum gold medal by the Association of the Polish Knights of Malta

==== Honorary military appointments ====
United Kingdom

- (United Kingdom) Honorary Colonel, Yorkshire Volunteers
- (United Kingdom) Honorary Major-General, Controller Commandant, Women's Royal Army Corps
- (United Kingdom) Colonel-in-Chief, of The Prince of Wales's Own Regiment of Yorkshire
- (United Kingdom) Colonel-in-Chief, of Army Catering Corps
- (United Kingdom) Deputy Colonel-in-Chief, of Adjutant General's Corps
- (United Kingdom) Deputy Colonel-in-Chief, of Royal Dragoon Guards
- (United Kingdom) Deputy Colonel-in-Chief, of Royal Logistic Corps

==== Civilian offices ====
- Chancellor of the University of Leeds (1966–1999)

==== Civic appointments ====
- Freeman of the Worshipful Company of Coachmakers and Coach Harness Makers
- Freeman of the Worshipful Company of Dyers
- Honorary Freeman of the Worshipful Company of Glaziers
- Honorary Freeman of the Worshipful Company of Musicians

==== Honorific eponyms ====
- The Duchess of Kent Children's Hospital at Sandy Bay

=== Arms ===
Coat of arms of the Duchess of Kent
Notes Coat of arms of the Duchess of Kent, depicting her husband's arms impaled with those of her father. Coronet Coronet of a Grandchild of the Sovereign Escutcheon The Duke of Kent's arms impaled with those of the Duchess's father, Sir William Worsley, 4th Baronet. Supporters The Royal Supporters differenced with the like coronet and label. Orders The Royal Victorian Order circlet. VICTORIA Other elements Insignia of GCVO appended

== Issue ==
Name	Birth	Death	Marriage		Children
George Windsor, Earl of St Andrews	26 June 1962		9 January 1988	Sylvana Tomaselli	Edward Windsor, Lord Downpatrick; Lady Marina Windsor; Lady Amelia Windsor
Lady Helen Taylor	28 April 1964		18 July 1992	Timothy Taylor	Columbus Taylor; Cassius Taylor; Eloise Taylor; Estella Taylor
Lord Nicholas Windsor	25 July 1970		4 November 2006	Paola Doimi de Lupis de Frankopan	Albert Windsor; Leopold Windsor; Louis Windsor
Lord Patrick Windsor (stillborn)	5 October 1977		None		

== Bibliography ==
- "Foreword", in: Jackson, Francis (2013). Music for a Long While. York Publishing Services. ISBN 9780957672208.

== See also ==
- The Duchess of Kent Children's Hospital at Sandy Bay, Hong Kong Island
- List of people diagnosed with coeliac disease

== Notes ==
Academic offices
Preceded by Mary, The Princess Royal	Chancellor of the University of Leeds; 1966–1999	Succeeded by Melvyn Bragg
