= List of dignitaries at the state funeral of Elizabeth II =

Countries from which at least one representative attended the state funeral of Elizabeth II on 19 September 2022.

The state funeral of Elizabeth II, Queen of the United Kingdom and the 14 other Commonwealth realms, was attended by a significant number of dignitaries from across the world, with priority given to those from the Commonwealth of Nations, becoming one of the largest gathering of world leaders in history. They attended a service at Westminster Abbey on 19 September 2022. In addition to foreign dignitaries, a small number of the Queen's family, friends, cabinet ministers, religious representatives, courtiers and employees, and volunteers who have supported their communities attended.

To accommodate all countries wishing to be allocated seats, the UK government limited the number of members in each official diplomatic delegation to two. 500 heads of state and foreign dignitaries were present at the funeral ceremony, which was attended by 2,000 people in total.

Representatives from 168 countries, out of 193 UN member states, two UN observer states and Kosovo, (Note: Kosovo's declaration of independence is recognised by the United Kingdom.) confirmed attendance, including 18 monarchs, 55 presidents and 25 prime ministers.

== Royal family and relatives ==
* Present at the committal service at St George's Chapel, Windsor Castle only.

=== House of Windsor ===
- The King and The Queen Consort, (Note: Before her coronation on 6 May 2023, Queen Camilla was initially styled as "Her Majesty The Queen Consort" to distinguish her from the recently deceased Queen Elizabeth II.) the late Queen's son and daughter-in-law
  - The Prince and Princess of Wales, the late Queen's grandson and granddaughter-in-law
    - Prince George of Wales, the late Queen's great-grandson
    - Princess Charlotte of Wales, the late Queen's great-granddaughter
  - The Duke and Duchess of Sussex, the late Queen's grandson and granddaughter-in-law
- The Princess Royal and Vice Admiral Sir Timothy Laurence, the late Queen's daughter and son-in-law
  - Peter Phillips, the late Queen's grandson
    - Savannah Phillips, the late Queen's great-granddaughter*
    - Isla Phillips, the late Queen's great-granddaughter*
  - Zara and Michael Tindall, the late Queen's granddaughter and grandson-in-law
    - Mia Tindall, the late Queen's great-granddaughter*
- The Duke of York and Sarah, Duchess of York, the late Queen's son and ex-daughter-in-law
  - Princess Beatrice and Edoardo Mapelli Mozzi, the late Queen's granddaughter and grandson-in-law
  - Princess Eugenie and Jack Brooksbank, the late Queen's granddaughter and grandson-in-law
- The Earl and Countess of Wessex and Forfar, the late Queen's son and daughter-in-law
  - Lady Louise Mountbatten-Windsor, the late Queen's granddaughter
  - Viscount Severn, the late Queen's grandson
- The Princess Margaret, Countess of Snowdon's family:
  - The Earl of Snowdon, the late Queen's nephew
    - Viscount Linley, the late Queen's great-nephew
    - Lady Margarita Armstrong-Jones, the late Queen's great-niece
  - Lady Sarah and Daniel Chatto, the late Queen's niece and nephew-in-law
    - Samuel Chatto, the late Queen's great-nephew
    - Second Lieutenant Arthur Chatto, the late Queen's great-nephew

Other descendants of the late Queen's paternal grandfather King George V and their families:

- The Duke and Duchess of Gloucester, the late Queen's first cousin and his wife
  - Earl and Countess of Ulster, the late Queen's first cousin once removed and his wife
    - Lord Culloden, the late Queen's first cousin twice removed
    - Lady Cosima Windsor, the late Queen's first cousin twice removed
  - Lady Davina Windsor, the late Queen's first cousin once removed
    - Senna Lewis, the late Queen's first cousin twice removed
  - Lady Rose and George Gilman, the late Queen's first cousin once removed and her husband
    - Lyla Gilman, the late Queen's first cousin twice removed
- The Duke of Kent, the late Queen's first cousin
  - Earl and Countess of St Andrews, the late Queen's first cousin once removed and his wife
    - Lord Downpatrick, the late Queen's first cousin twice removed
    - Lady Marina Windsor, the late Queen's first cousin twice removed
    - Lady Amelia Windsor, the late Queen's first cousin twice removed
  - Lady Helen and Timothy Taylor, the late Queen's first cousin once removed and her husband
    - Columbus Taylor, the late Queen's first cousin twice removed
    - Cassius Taylor, the late Queen's first cousin twice removed
    - Eloise Taylor, the late Queen's first cousin twice removed
    - Estella Taylor, the late Queen's first cousin twice removed
  - Lord Nicholas Windsor, the late Queen's first cousin once removed
    - Albert Windsor, the late Queen's first cousin twice removed
    - Leopold Windsor, the late Queen's first cousin twice removed
- Princess Alexandra, The Hon. Lady Ogilvy, the late Queen's first cousin
  - James and Julia Ogilvy, the late Queen's first cousin once removed and his wife
    - Flora and Timothy Vesterberg, the late Queen's first cousin twice removed and her husband
    - Alexander Ogilvy, the late Queen's first cousin twice removed
  - Marina Ogilvy, the late Queen's first cousin once removed
    - Zenouska Mowatt, the late Queen's first cousin twice removed
    - Christian Mowatt, the late Queen's first cousin twice removed
- Prince and Princess Michael of Kent, the late Queen's first cousin and his wife
  - Lord and Lady Frederick Windsor, the late Queen's first cousin once removed and his wife
  - Lady Gabriella and Thomas Kingston, the late Queen's first cousin once removed and her husband

=== Other descendants of Queen Victoria ===
- The Earl and Countess of Harewood, the late Queen's first cousin once removed and his wife*
- The Duke and Duchess of Fife, the late Queen's second cousin once removed and his wife
- Lady Alexandra and Mark Etherington, the late Queen's second cousin once removed and her husband
- Major Ian Liddell-Grainger (representing the Commonwealth Parliamentary Association), the late Queen's second cousin once removed
- Princess Antonia, Duchess of Wellington, and the Duke of Wellington, the late Queen's third cousin once removed and the late Queen's fifth cousin*
- The Countess Mountbatten of Burma, wife of the late Queen's third cousin once removed
  - Lady Alexandra and Thomas Hooper, the late Queen's third cousin twice removed and her husband
- The Hon. Michael-John Knatchbull, the late Queen's third cousin once removed*
- Lady Joanna Zuckerman, the late Queen's third cousin once removed*
- Lady Amanda Ellingworth, the late Queen's third cousin once removed*
- The Hon. Philip Knatchbull, the late Queen's third cousin once removed*
- The Hon. Timothy Knatchbull, the late Queen's third cousin once removed*
- Lady Pamela Hicks, the late Queen's third cousin
  - Edwina Brudenell, the late Queen's third cousin once removed*
    - Maddison Brudenell, the late Queen's third cousin twice removed*
  - India Hicks, the late Queen's third cousin once removed

=== Bowes-Lyon family ===
Descendants of the late Queen's aunt, Mary Elphinstone, Lady Elphinstone:

- Rosemary and James Leschallas, the late Queen's first cousin once removed and her husband
- Susan and Peregrine Bertie, the late Queen's first cousin once removed and her husband
- Simon and Susan Rhodes, the late Queen's first cousin once removed and his wife
- Michael Rhodes, the late Queen's first cousin once removed
- Annabel Cope, the late Queen's first cousin once removed
- Victoria and John Pryor, the late Queen's first cousin once removed and her husband

Descendants of the late Queen's uncle, Lieutenant The Hon. John Bowes-Lyon:

- Leonora, Countess of Lichfield, former wife of the late Queen's first cousin once removed*

Descendants of the late Queen's aunt, Rose Leveson-Gower, Countess Granville:

- The Earl Granville, the late Queen's first cousin once removed*
- The Hon. Niall Leveson-Gower, the late Queen's first cousin once removed*
- Gilbert and Rosalind Clayton, the late Queen's first cousin once removed and his wife
- Rose and William Stancer, the late Queen's first cousin once removed and her husband

Descendants of the late Queen's uncle, Lt.-Col. The Hon. Michael Bowes-Lyon:

- Lady Elizabeth and Antony Leeming, the late Queen's first cousin once removed and her husband
- Lady Diana and Christopher Godfrey-Faussett, the late Queen's first cousin once removed and her husband
- Sarah and Peter Troughton, the late Queen's first cousin once removed and her husband
- Sabrina and Christopher Penn, the late Queen's first cousin once removed and her husband*
- Matthew and Jane Colman, the late Queen's first cousin once removed and his wife
- The Hon. Albemarle Bowes-Lyon, the late Queen's first cousin

Descendants of the late Queen's uncle, The Hon. Sir David Bowes-Lyon:

- Sir Simon Bowes-Lyon and Lady (Caroline) Bowes-Lyon, the late Queen's first cousin and his wife

Descendants of the late Queen's great-uncle, the Hon. Francis Bowes-Lyon:

- Captain David and Harriet Bowes-Lyon, the late Queen's second cousin once removed and his wife

=== Phillips family ===
- Captain Mark Phillips, former husband of the Princess Royal*

=== Spencer family ===
- The Lady and Lord Fellowes, former sister-in-law of the King, and her husband, a former private secretary to the late Queen
- The Earl and Countess Spencer*, the late Queen's Godson, former brother-in-law to the King and his wife

=== Parker Bowles and Shand families ===
- Andrew Parker Bowles, former husband of the Queen Consort*
  - Tom Parker Bowles, Godson of the King and son of the Queen Consort
    - Lola Parker Bowles, granddaughter of the Queen Consort
    - Frederick Parker Bowles, grandson of the Queen Consort
  - Laura and Harry Lopes, daughter and son-in-law of the Queen Consort
    - Eliza Lopes, granddaughter of the Queen Consort
    - Gus Lopes, grandson of the Queen Consort
    - Louis Lopes, grandson of the Queen Consort
- Annabel and Simon Elliot, sister and brother-in-law of the Queen Consort

=== Middleton family ===
- Michael and Carole Middleton, parents of the Princess of Wales

== United Kingdom ==
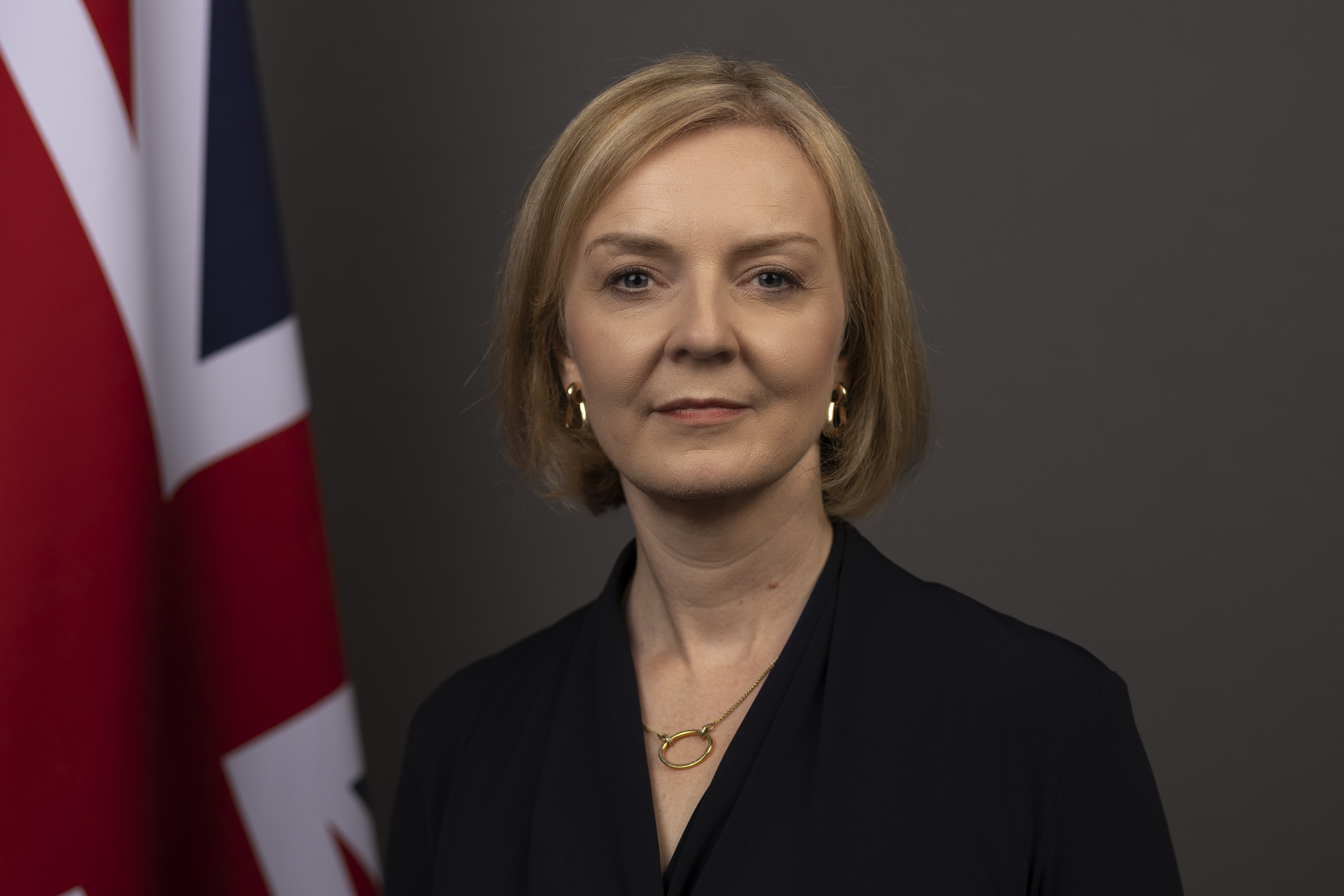
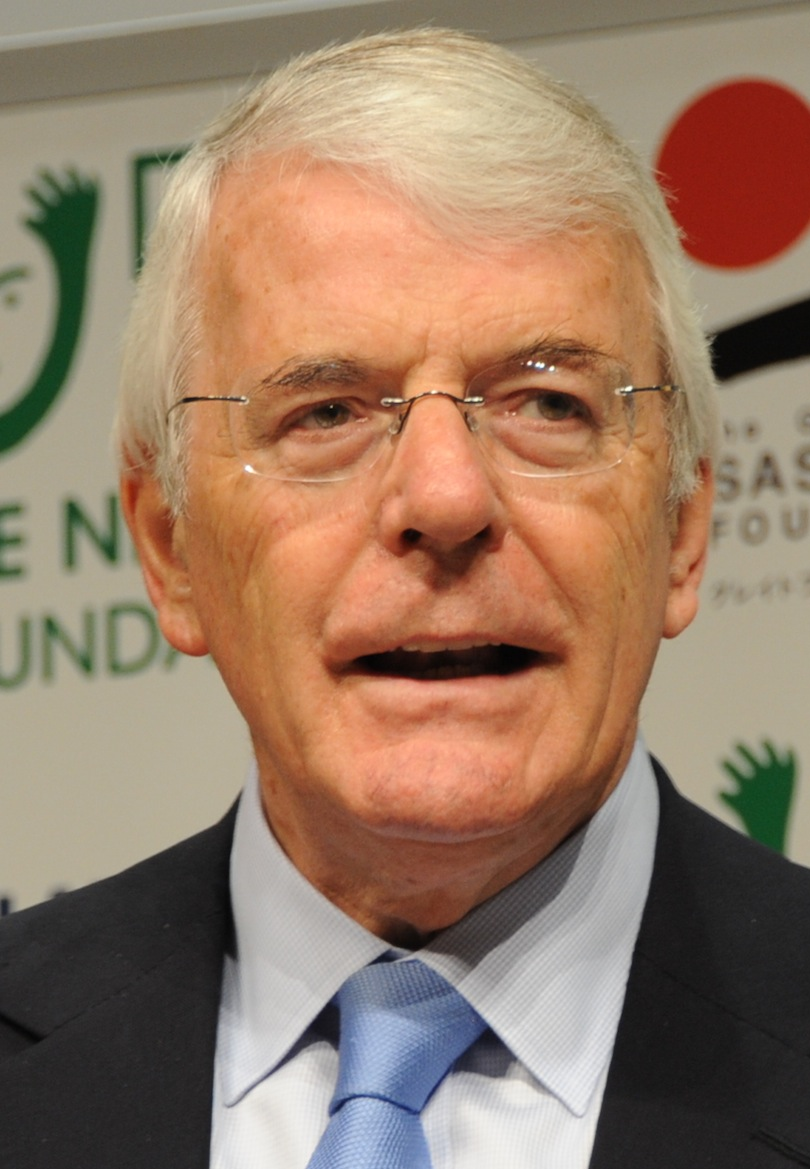
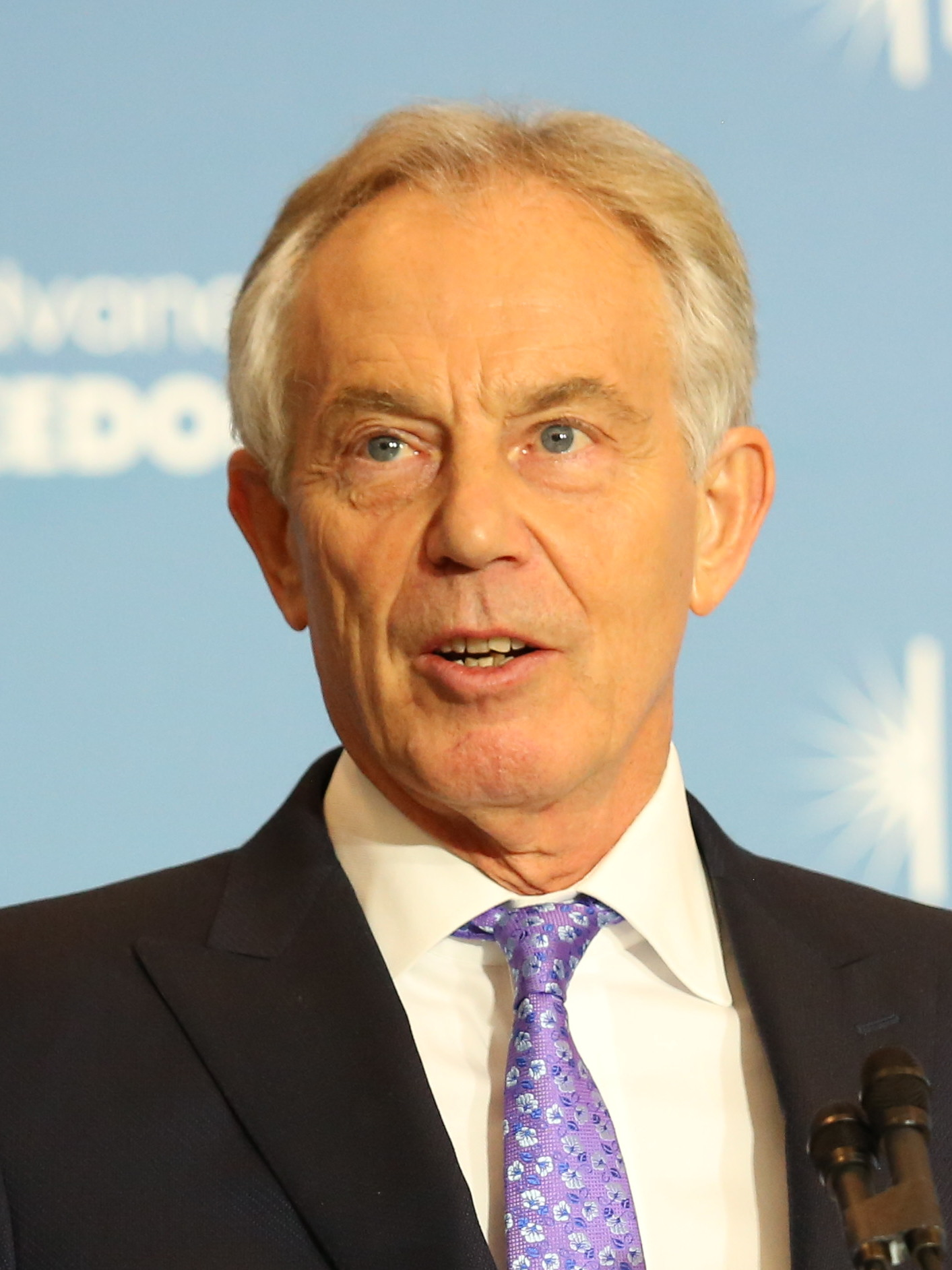
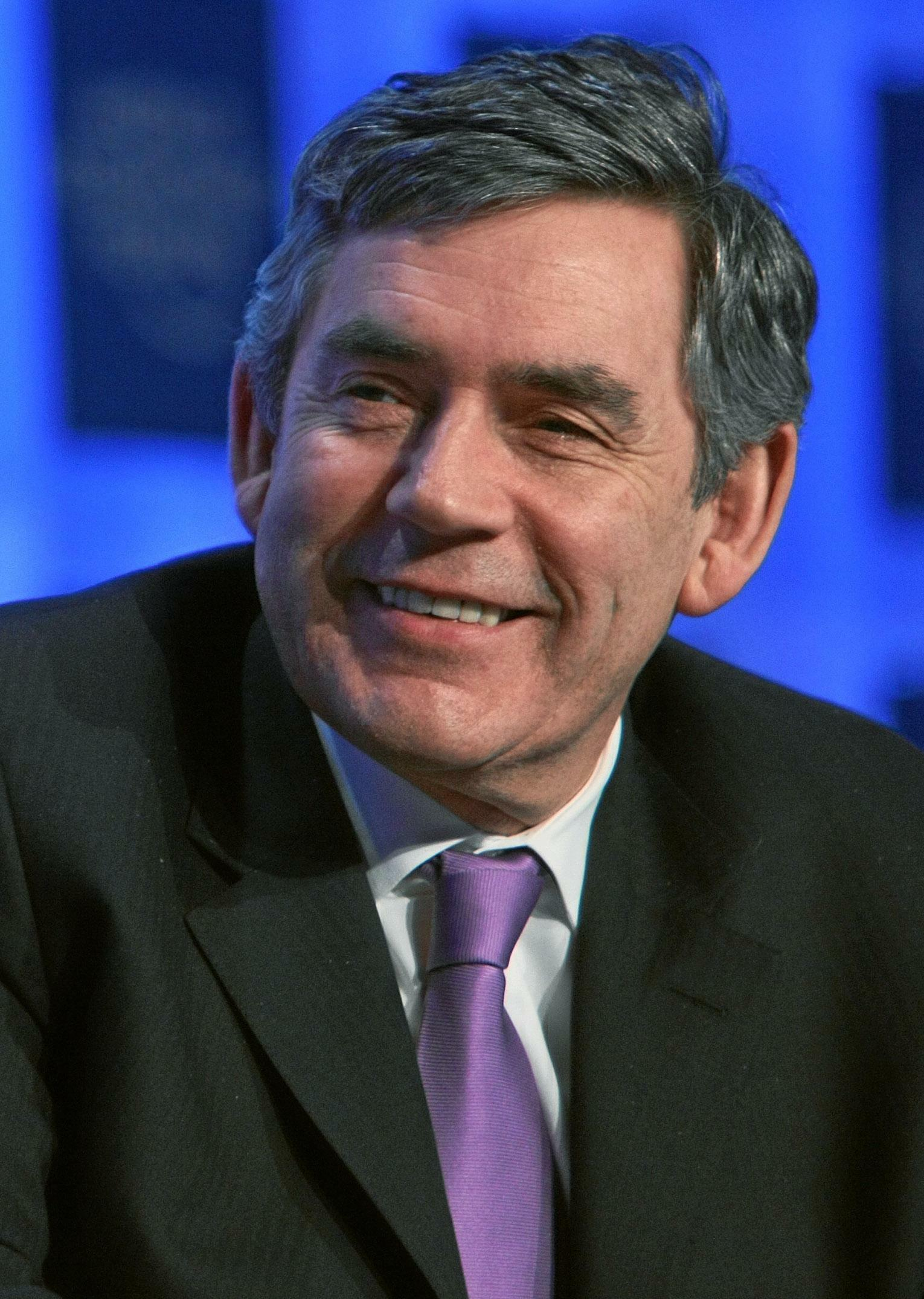
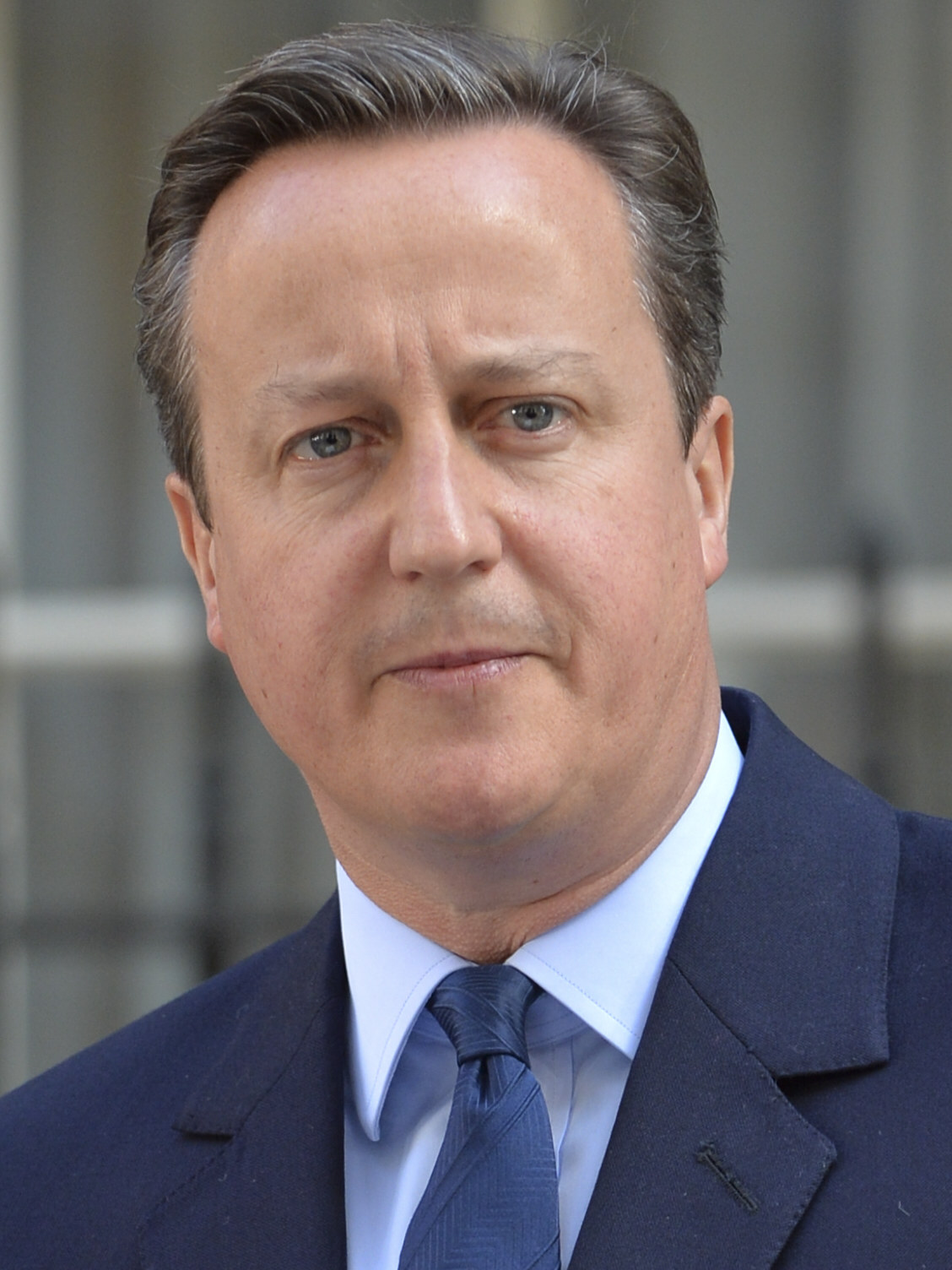
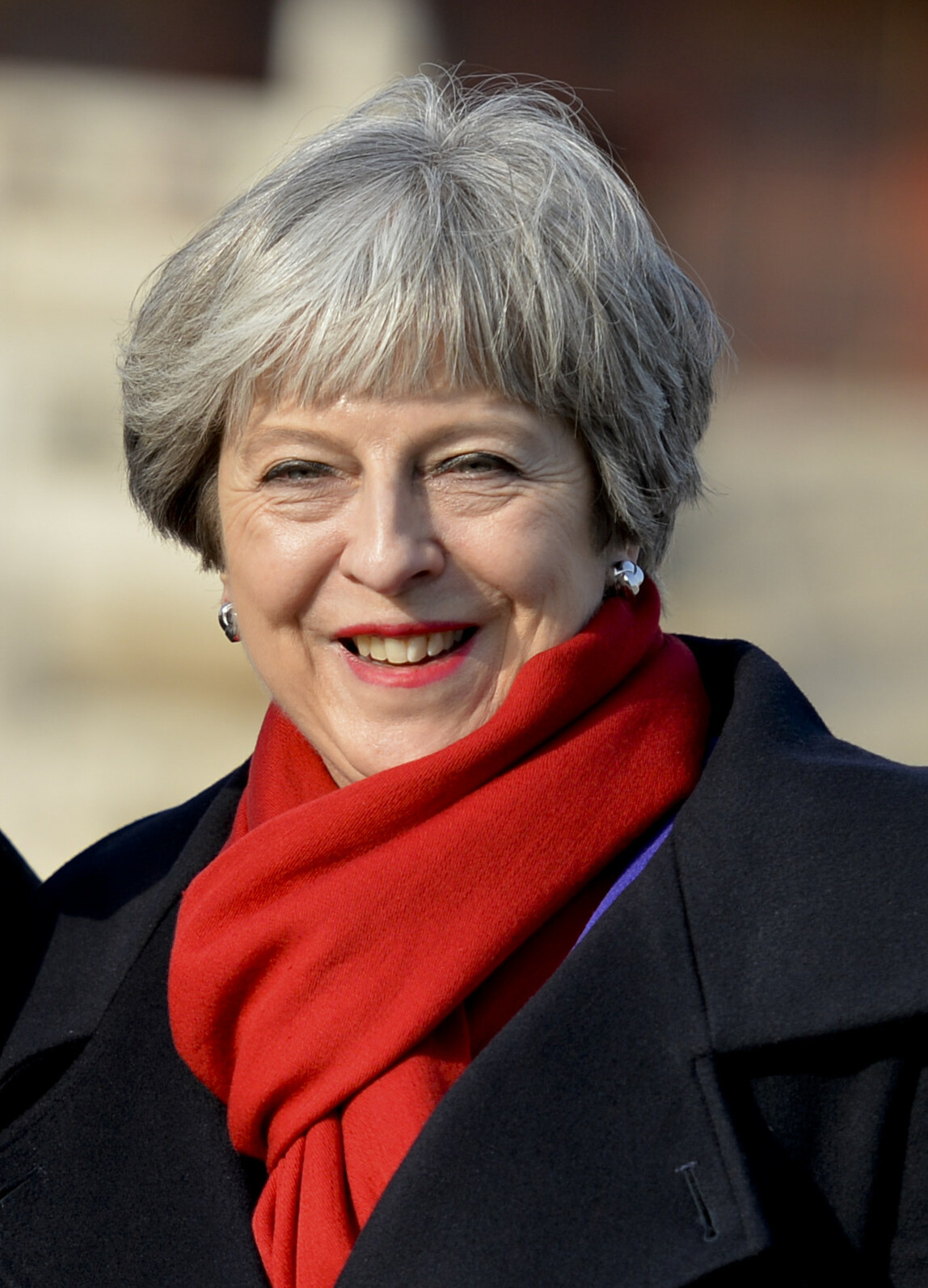
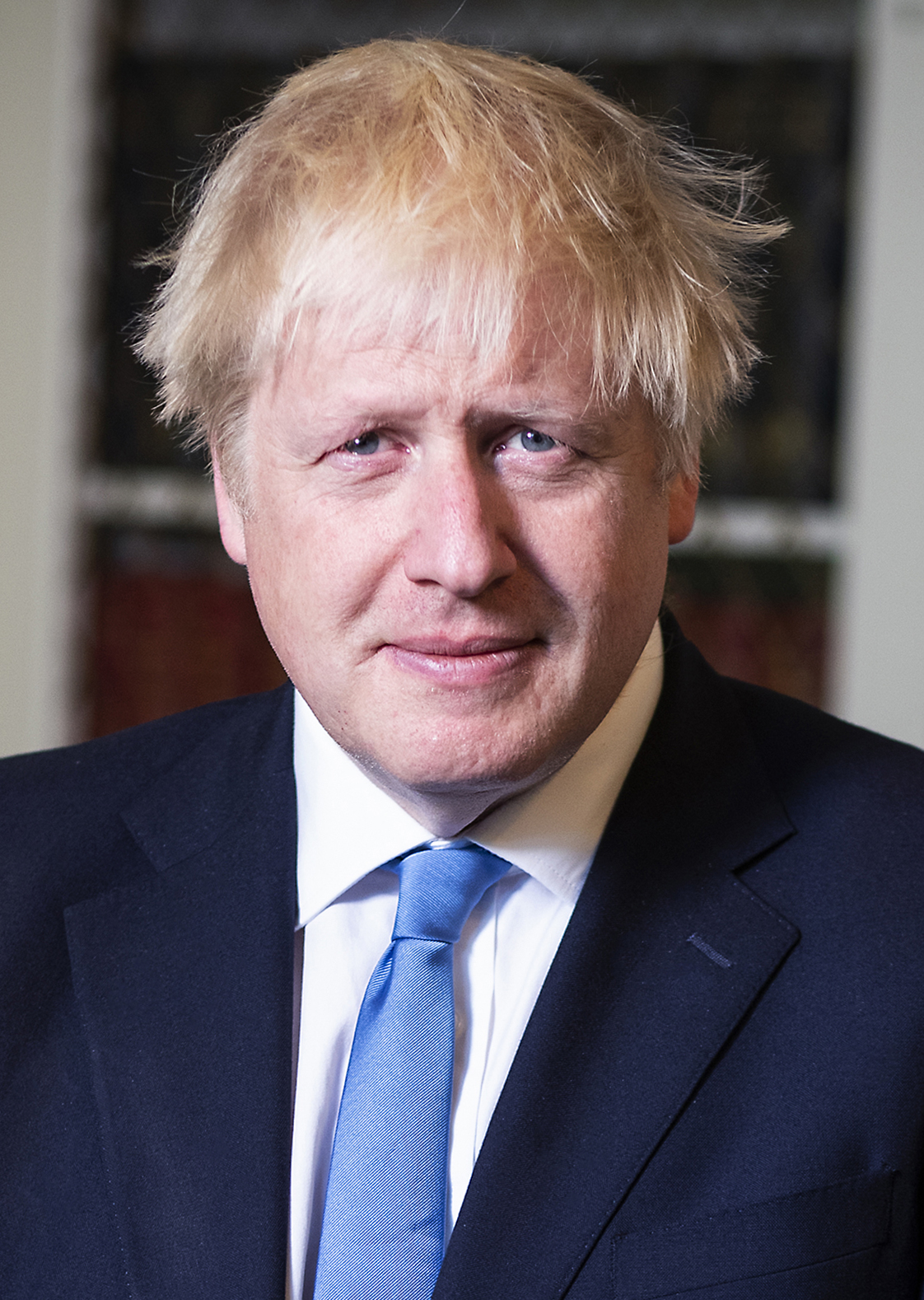
The incumbent British Prime Minister, Liz Truss (top), along with six former British Prime Ministers, attended the late Queen's state funeral.

All living prime ministers were present at both the state funeral and the committal service.

- Liz Truss, Prime Minister of the United Kingdom, and her husband Hugh O'Leary
  - Sir John Major, Prime Minister of the United Kingdom (1990–1997), and Dame Norma, Lady Major
  - Sir Tony Blair, Prime Minister of the United Kingdom (1997–2007), and Lady (Cherie) Blair
  - Gordon Brown, Prime Minister of the United Kingdom (2007–2010), and Sarah Brown
  - David Cameron, Prime Minister of the United Kingdom (2010–2016), and Samantha Cameron
  - Lady (Theresa) May, Prime Minister of the United Kingdom (2016–2019), and Sir Philip May
  - Boris Johnson, Prime Minister of the United Kingdom (2019–2022), and Carrie Johnson
- Sir Lindsay Hoyle, Speaker of the House of Commons, and Lady (Catherine) Hoyle
- The Lord McFall of Alcluith, Lord Speaker, and Lady McFall of Alcluith

=== Great Officers of State ===
- The Duke of Norfolk, Earl Marshal
- The Lord and Lady Carrington, Lord Great Chamberlain and his wife
- The Marquess and Marchioness of Cholmondeley, former Lord Great Chamberlain and his wife
- The Earl of Erroll, Lord High Constable of Scotland

=== Sovereign's Bodyguard ===
- The Baroness Williams of Trafford, Chief Whip of the House of Lords, Captain of the Honourable Corps of Gentlemen-at-Arms
- The Earl of Courtown, Captain of the Yeomen of the Guard
- The Duke and Duchess of Buccleuch and Queensberry, Captain General of the Royal Company of Archers and his wife

=== Pallbearers ===
- Lieutenant-Colonel Sir Alexander Matheson of Matheson, Coldstream Guards (Extra Equerry; Secretary, Central Chancery of the Orders of Knighthood, 2005–2014)
- Air Marshal Sir David Walker, RAF (Extra Equerry; Master of the Household, 2005–2013)
- Major James Patrick, Irish Guards (Equerry, 1992–1995)
- Lieutenant-Commander Toby Williamson, RN (Equerry, 1995–1998)
- Squadron Leader Simon Brailsford, RAF (Equerry,1998–2001)
- Major James Duckworth-Chad, Coldstream Guards (Equerry, 2001–2004)
- Commander Heber Ackland, RN (Equerry, 2004–2007)
- Wing Commander Andrew Calame, RAF (Equerry, 2007–2010)
- Lieutenant-Colonel Dan Rex, Royal Gurkha Rifles (Equerry, 2010–2012)
- Lieutenant Commander Andrew Canale, RN (Equerry, 2012–2015)
- Wing Commander Samuel Fletcher, RAF (Equerry, 2015–2017)
- Lieutenant-Colonel Nana Kofi Twumasi-Ankrah, Blues and Royals (Equerry, 2017–2020)
- Lieutenant-Colonel Charles Richards, Welsh Guards (Equerry; Deputy Master of the Household)
- Lieutenant-Colonel Tom White, RM (Equerry)

=== Royal Household ===
- The Lord Parker of Minsmere, Lord Chamberlain
- The Earl of Dalhousie, Lord Steward
- The Lord de Mauley, Master of the Horse
- Tim Knox, Director of the Royal Collection
- Michael Vernon, Comptroller, Lord Chamberlain's Office
- Sir Tony Johnstone-Burt, Master of the Household
- Major General Eldon Millar, Defence Services Secretary
- Colonel Toby Browne, Crown Equerry
- Craig Whittaker, Treasurer of the Household
- Rebecca Harris, Comptroller of the Household
- Jo Churchill, Vice-Chamberlain of the Household
- Sir Edward Young, Private Secretary to the Sovereign
- Sir Clive Alderton, Principal Private Secretary to the former Prince of Wales
- Mark Leishman, Private Secretary to the former Prince of Wales
- John Sorabji, Deputy Private Secretary to the Sovereign
- David Hogan-Hern, Deputy Private Secretary to the Sovereign
- Sir Michael Stevens, Keeper of the Privy Purse
- The Earl of Rosslyn, Master of the Household to the former Prince of Wales
- The Earl and Countess of Airlie, former Lord Chamberlain and his wife, who was a Lady in Waiting to the late Queen
- The Lord Luce, former Lord Chamberlain
- The Earl and Countess Peel, former Lord Chamberlain and his wife
- The Lord and Lady Janvrin, former Private Secretary and his wife
- The Lord and Lady Geidt, former Private Secretary and his wife
- Paul Whybrew, Page to the late Queen
- Barry Mitford, Page to the late Queen
- The Hon. Mary Morrison, Lady in Waiting to the late Queen
- The Lady Hussey of North Bradley, Lady in Waiting to the late Queen
- The Lady and Lord Elton, Lady in Waiting to the late Queen, and her husband
- The Hon. Dame Annabel Whitehead, Lady in Waiting to the late Queen
- Jennifer Gordon-Lennox, Lady in Waiting to the late Queen
- Angela Kelly, personal assistant and senior dresser to the late Queen
- The Viscount and Viscountess Brookeborough, Personal Lord in Waiting and his wife
- The Viscount Hood, Personal Lord in Waiting
- Lieutenant Colonel Jonathan Thompson, Equerry to the former Prince of Wales
- Lieutenant Commander Rob Dixon RN, Equerry to the Prince of Wales
- Commander Anne Sullivan RN, Deputy Private Secretary to The Princess Royal
- Sarah Clarke, Lady Usher of the Black Rod
- The Duke of Hamilton and Brandon, Hereditary Keeper of the Palace of Holyroodhouse
- The Duke and Duchess of Argyll, Hereditary Master of the Royal Household in Scotland and his wife
- The Earl of Dundee, Hereditary Royal Standard Bearer for Scotland

=== Officers of Arms ===
==== England ====
- David White, Garter Principal King of Arms
- Timothy Duke, Clarenceux King of Arms
- Robert Noel, Norroy and Ulster King of Arms
- Peter O'Donoghue, York Herald
- John Allen-Petrie, Richmond Herald
- John Martin Robinson, Maltravers Herald Extraordinary
- Major David Rankin-Hunt, Norfolk Herald Extraordinary
- Thomas Lloyd, Wales Herald Extraordinary
- Adam Tuck, Rouge Dragon Pursuivant
- Mark Scott, Bluemantle Pursuivant
- Dominic Ingram, Portcullis Pursuivant

==== Scotland ====
- Joseph Morrow, Lord Lyon King of Arms
- Adam Bruce, Marchmont Herald
- Liam Devlin, Rothesay Herald
- George Way of Plean, Carrick Pursuivant
- John Stirling, Ormond Pursuivant
- Roderick Macpherson, Unicorn Pursuivant
- Professor Gillian Black, Linlithgow Pursuivant Extraordinary
- Colin Russell, Falkland Pursuivant Extraordinary
- Philip Tibbetts, March Pursuivant Extraordinary

=== Household Division ===
- Lieutenant General Sir Edward Smyth-Osbourne, Gold Stick-in-Waiting, Colonel of the Life Guards
- Lieutenant General Sir James Bucknall, Colonel of the Coldstream Guards
- Major General Chris Ghika, Major-General commanding the Household Division
- Colonel Mark Berry, Silver Stick-in-Waiting
- Lieutenant Colonel Gareth Light, Field Officer in Brigade Waiting

=== Members of the Cabinet ===
- Thérèse Coffey, Deputy Prime Minister, Secretary of State for Health and Social Care
- Kwasi Kwarteng, Chancellor of the Exchequer
- James Cleverly, Secretary of State for Foreign, Commonwealth and Development Affairs
- Suella Braverman, Secretary of State for the Home Department
- Ben Wallace, Secretary of State for Defence
- Brandon Lewis, Lord High Chancellor of Great Britain, Secretary of State for Justice
- Nadhim Zahawi, Chancellor of the Duchy of Lancaster, Minister for Intergovernmental Relations, Minister for Equalities
- Penny Mordaunt, Leader of the House of Commons, Lord President of the Council
- The Lord True, Leader of the House of Lords, Lord Keeper of the Privy Seal
- Jake Berry, Chairman of the Conservative Party, Minister without Portfolio
- Alok Sharma, President for COP26, Minister of State at the Cabinet Office
- Jacob Rees-Mogg, Secretary of State for Business, Energy and Industrial Strategy
- Kemi Badenoch, Secretary of State for International Trade, President of the Board of Trade
- Chloe Smith, Secretary of State for Work and Pensions
- Kit Malthouse, Secretary of State for Education
- Ranil Jayawardena, Secretary of State for Environment, Food and Rural Affairs
- Anne-Marie Trevelyan, Secretary of State for Transport
- Chris Heaton-Harris, Secretary of State for Northern Ireland
- Michelle Donelan, Secretary of State for Digital, Culture, Media and Sport
- Alister Jack, Secretary of State for Scotland
- Sir Robert Buckland, Secretary of State for Wales

=== Leaders of other UK political parties ===
- Sir Keir Starmer, Leader of His Majesty's Most Loyal Opposition, and Leader of the Labour Party
- Sir Ed Davey, Leader of the Liberal Democrats
- Ian Blackford, Leader of the Scottish National Party in the House of Commons
- Sir Jeffrey Donaldson, Leader of the Democratic Unionist Party
- Liz Saville Roberts, Leader of Plaid Cymru in the House of Commons
- Colum Eastwood, Leader of the Social Democratic and Labour Party

=== First ministers of devolved governments ===
- Nicola Sturgeon, First Minister of Scotland, and Peter Murrell
- Mark Drakeford, First Minister of Wales, and Clare Drakeford
- Michelle O'Neill, First Minister-designate of Northern Ireland

=== Leaders of other political parties in devolved nations ===
- Anas Sarwar, Leader of the Scottish Labour Party
- Douglas Ross, Leader of the Scottish Conservative and Unionist Party
- Alex Cole-Hamilton, Leader of the Scottish Liberal Democrats
- Andrew R. T. Davies, Leader of the Welsh Conservatives
- Jane Dodds, Leader of the Welsh Liberal Democrats
- Naomi Long, Leader of the Alliance Party of Northern Ireland
- Doug Beattie, Leader of Ulster Unionist Party

=== Other politicians ===
- Hamza Taouzzale, Lord Mayor of Westminster, and his mother Soud
- Vincent Keaveny, Lord Mayor of London, and Amanda Keaveny
- Sadiq Khan, Mayor of London, and Saadiya Khan
- The Baroness Smith of Basildon, Leader of the Labour Party in the House of Lords
- Rachel Reeves, Shadow Chancellor of the Exchequer
- David Lammy, Shadow Secretary of State for Foreign, Commonwealth and Development Affairs
- The Lord Judge, Convenor of the Crossbench Peers
- The Lord Hague of Richmond, former Leader of the Conservative Party and Leader of the Opposition
- Sir Iain Duncan Smith, former Leader of the Conservative Party and Leader of the Opposition
- The Lord Forsyth of Drumlean, Chairman of the Association of Conservative Peers
- Sir Graham Brady, Chairman of the 1922 Committee

=== Recipients of orders and decorations ===
- Johnson Beharry, recipient of the Victoria Cross
- Keith Payne, recipient of the Victoria Cross
- Joshua Leakey, recipient of the Victoria Cross
- Jim Beaton, recipient of the George Cross
- Matthew Croucher, recipient of the George Cross
- Christopher Finney, recipient of the George Cross
- Tony Gledhill, recipient of the George Cross
- Kevin Haberfield, recipient of the George Cross
- Kim Hughes, recipient of the George Cross
- Peter Norton, recipient of the George Cross
- Samuel Shephard, recipient of the George Cross
- Dominic Troulan, recipient of the George Cross
- The Baroness Manningham-Buller, Lady Companion of the Order of the Garter
- The Marquess of Salisbury, Knight Companion of the Order of the Garter
- The Baroness Amos, Lady Companion of the Order of the Garter
- The Lord Wilson of Tillyorn, Knight of the Order of the Thistle
- The Lord Patel, Knight of the Order of the Thistle
- Lady Elish Angiolini, Lady of the Order of the Thistle
- Sir Stephen Dalton, Knight Grand Cross of the Order of the Bath
- Sir Patrick Vallance, Knight Commander of the Order of the Bath
- Sir Chris Whitty, Knight Commander of the Order of the Bath
- Susan Ridge, Companion of the Order of the Bath
- Neil MacGregor, Member of the Order of Merit
- The Lord Darzi of Denham, Member of the Order of Merit
- Dame Ann Dowling, Member of the Order of Merit
- Sir David Manning, Knight Grand Cross of the Order of St. Michael and St. George
- The Baroness Ashton of Upholland, Dame Grand Cross of the Order of St. Michael and St. George
- The Lord Sterling of Plaistow, Knight Grand Cross of the Royal Victorian Order
- Sir Christopher Greenwood, Knight Grand Cross of the Order of the British Empire
- Dame Amelia Fawcett, Dame Commander of the Order of the British Empire
- Sir Richard Eyre, Member of the Order of the Companions of Honour
- Sir Paul Nurse, Member of the Order of the Companions of Honour
- Dame Marina Warner, Member of the Order of the Companions of Honour
- The Lord Lingfield, Knight Bachelor
- Sir Colin Berry, Knight Bachelor
- Sir Gary Hickinbottom, Knight Bachelor

=== Crown Dependencies ===
- Richard Cripwell, Lieutenant Governor of Guernsey
- Sir Timothy Le Cocq, Bailiff of Jersey
- Sir John Lorimer, Lieutenant Governor of the Isle of Man

=== British Overseas Territories ===
- Dileeni Daniel-Selvaratnam, Governor of Anguilla
  - Ellis Webster, Premier of Anguilla
- Paul Candler, Commissioner for the British Antarctic Territory and the British Indian Ocean Territory
- Rena Lalgie, Governor of Bermuda
  - Edward David Burt, Premier of Bermuda
- Martyn Roper, Governor of the Cayman Islands
  - Wayne Panton, Premier of the Cayman Islands
- Alison Blake, Governor of the Falkland Islands and Commissioner for South Georgia and the South Sandwich Islands
  - Roger Spink, Member of the Legislative Assembly of the Falkland Islands
- Sir David Steel, Governor of Gibraltar
  - Fabian Picardo, Chief Minister of Gibraltar
- Sarah Tucker, Governor of Montserrat
  - Easton Taylor-Farrell, Premier of Montserrat
- Iona Thomas, Governor of Pitcairn, British high commissioner to New Zealand
- Nigel Phillips, Governor of Saint Helena, Ascension and Tristan da Cunha
  - Julie Thomas, Chief Minister of Saint Helena
- Nigel Dakin, Governor of the Turks and Caicos Islands
  - Charles Washington Misick, Premier of the Turks and Caicos Islands
- John Rankin, Governor of the British Virgin Islands
  - Natalio Wheatley, Premier of the British Virgin Islands

=== Service Chiefs ===
- Admiral Sir Tony Radakin, Chief of the Defence Staff
  - Marshal of the Royal Air Force The Lord Craig of Radley, Chief of the Defence Staff (1988–1991)
  - Field Marshal The Lord Guthrie of Craigiebank, Chief of the Defence Staff (1997–2001)
  - Field Marshal The Lord Walker of Aldringham, Chief of the Defence Staff (2003–2006)
  - Marshal of the Royal Air Force The Lord Stirrup, Chief of the Defence Staff (2006–2010)
  - General The Lord Richards of Herstmonceux, Chief of the Defence Staff (2010–2013)
  - General The Lord Houghton of Richmond, Chief of the Defence Staff (2013–2016)
  - Air Chief Marshal The Lord Peach, Chief of the Defence Staff (2016–2018)
  - General Sir Nicholas Carter, Chief of the Defence Staff (2018–2021)
- General Gwyn Jenkins, Vice Chief of the Defence Staff
- Admiral Sir Ben Key, First Sea Lord and Chief of the Naval Staff
  - Admiral of the Fleet Sir Benjamin Bathurst, First Sea Lord and Chief of the Naval Staff (1993–1995)
- General Sir Patrick Sanders, Chief of the General Staff
  - General The Lord Dannatt, Chief of the General Staff (2006–2009)
- Air Chief Marshal Sir Michael Wigston, Chief of the Air Staff
- General Sir James Hockenhull, Commander Strategic Command

== Other realms ==
Prime ministers and governors-general were in attendance at both the state funeral and the committal service.

=== Canada ===
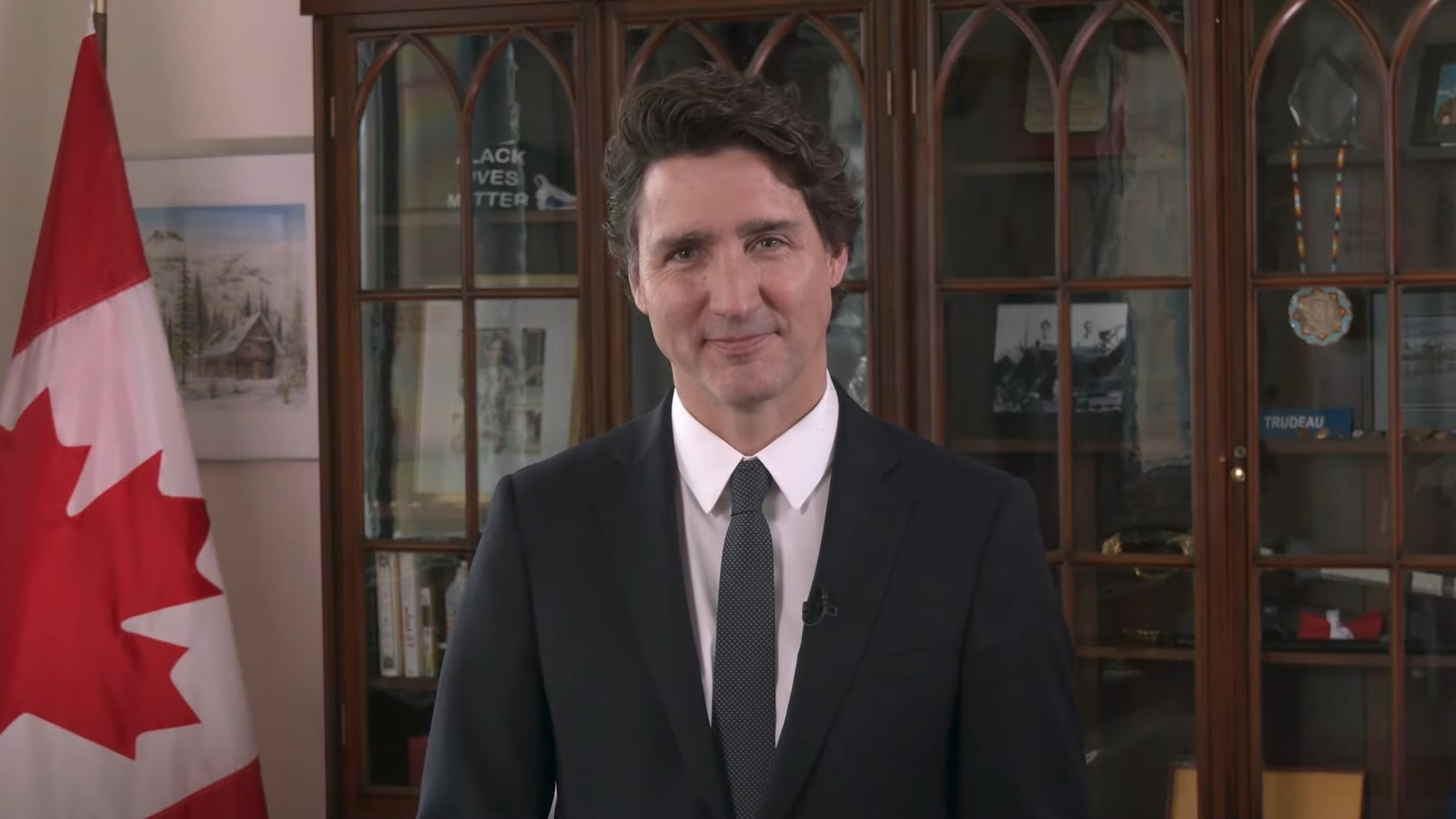
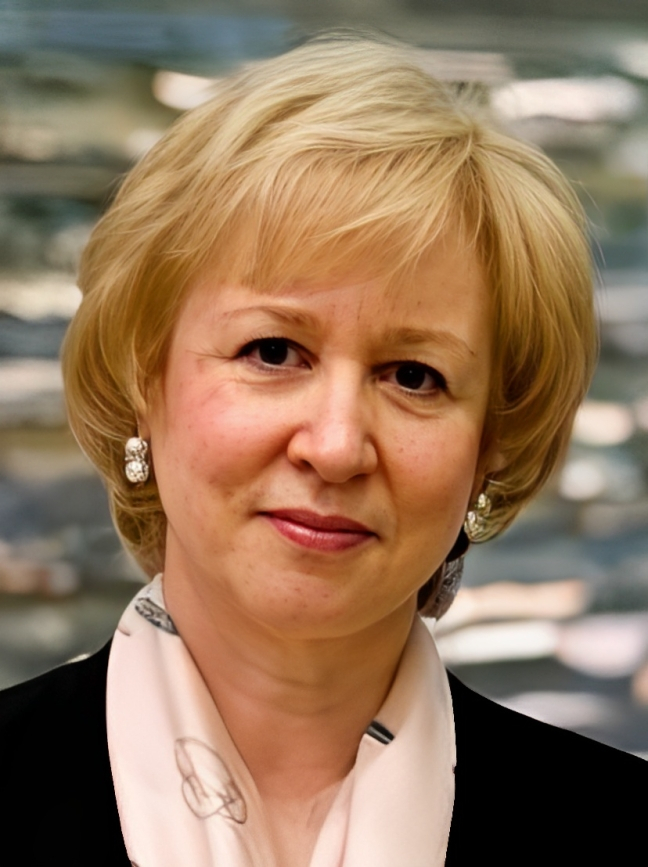
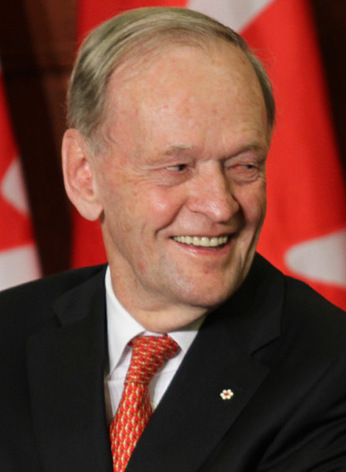
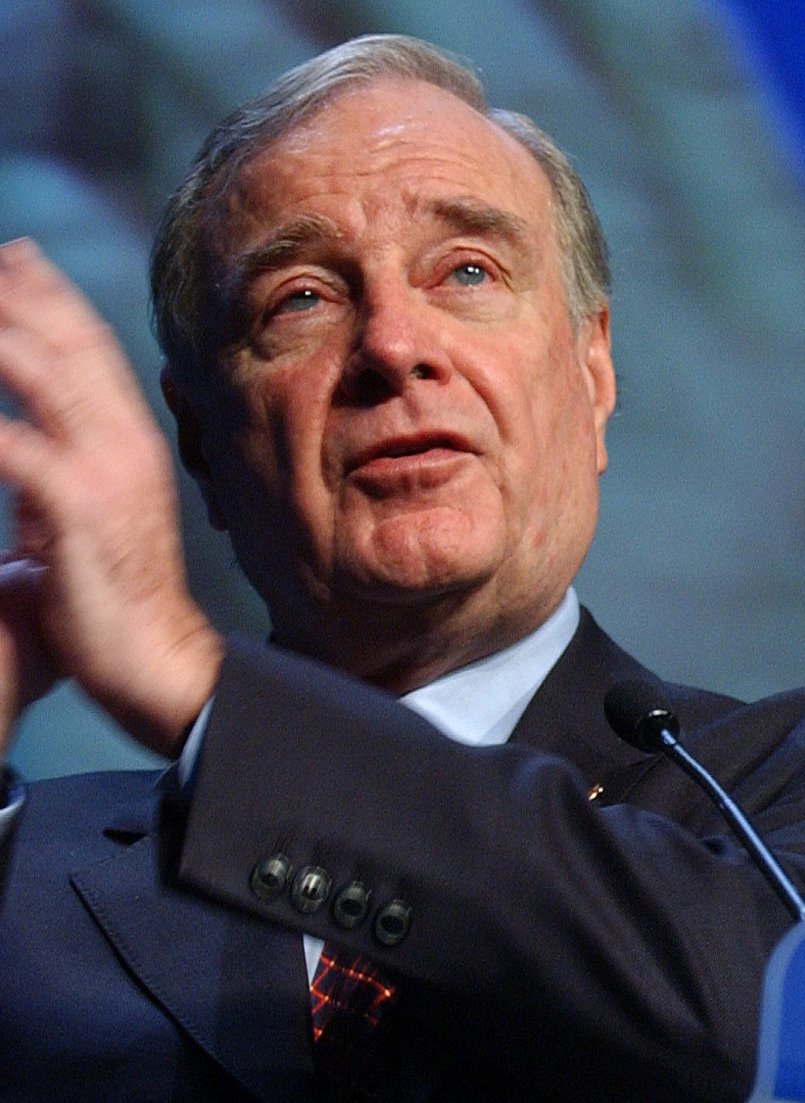
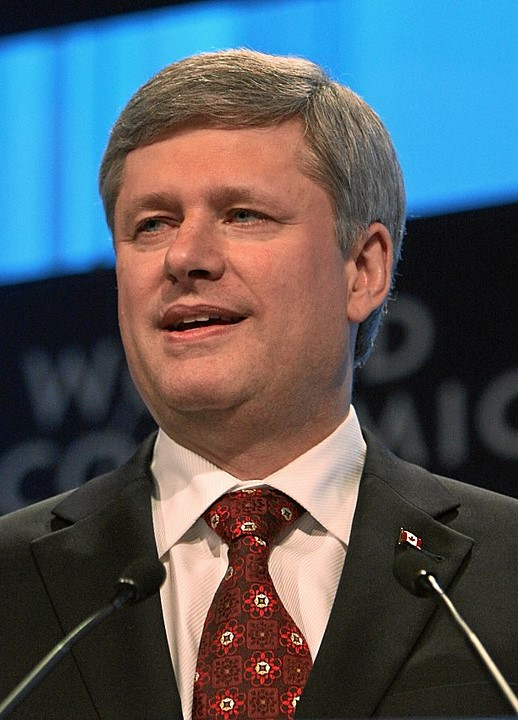
The concurrent Canadian Prime Minister, Justin Trudeau (top), along with four former Canadian Prime Ministers, attended the state funeral of Canada's late Queen.
- Mary Simon, Governor General of Canada, and Whit Fraser
  - Michaëlle Jean, Governor General of Canada (2005–2010)
  - David Johnston, Governor General of Canada (2010–2017)
- Justin Trudeau, Prime Minister of Canada, and Sophie Grégoire Trudeau
  - Kim Campbell, Prime Minister of Canada (1993)
  - Jean Chrétien, Prime Minister of Canada (1993–2003)
  - Paul Martin, Prime Minister of Canada (2003–2006)
  - Stephen Harper, Prime Minister of Canada (2006–2015)
- Ralph Goodale, Canadian high commissioner to the United Kingdom
  - Janice Charette, Clerk of the Privy Council and Secretary to the Cabinet, former Canadian high commissioner to the United Kingdom
- RoseAnne Archibald, National Chief of the Assembly of First Nations
- Cassidy Caron, President of the Métis National Council
- Natan Obed, President of the Inuit Tapiriit Kanatami
- Gregory Charles, radio and television presenter and Officer of the Order of Canada
- Sandra Oh, actress and Officer of the Order of Canada
- Mark Tewksbury, former competitive swimmer and Companion of the Order of Canada
- Leslie Arthur Palmer, recipient of the Cross of Valour

=== Australia ===
- David Hurley, Governor-General of Australia, and Linda Hurley
- Anthony Albanese, Prime Minister of Australia, and Jodie Haydon
- Lynette Wood, acting Australian high commissioner and chargé d'affaires to the United Kingdom
- Keith Payne, recipient of the Victoria Cross
- Mark Donaldson, recipient of the Victoria Cross for Australia
- Daniel Keighran, recipient of the Victoria Cross for Australia
- Ben Roberts-Smith, recipient of the Victoria Cross for Australia
- Michael Pratt, recipient of the George Cross
- Allan Sparkes, recipient of the Cross of Valour
- Mark Dodgson, Officer of the Order of Australia
- Dylan Alcott, 2022 Australian of the Year
- Valmai Dempsey, 2022 Senior Australian of the Year
- Dr Miriam-Rose Ungunmerr-Baumann, 2021 Senior Australian of the Year
- Shanna Whan, 2022 Australian of the Year Local Hero
- Saba Abraham, 2022 Local Hero, Queensland
- Kim Smith APM, 2022 Local Hero, Tasmania
- Trudy Lin, 2022 Young Australian of the Year, South Australia
- Danny Abdallah, Co-Creator of i4give Day and Foundation
- Professor Helen Milroy, 2021 Australian of the Year, Western Australia
- Robbie and Gai Waterhouse, horse-racing personalities

=== New Zealand ===
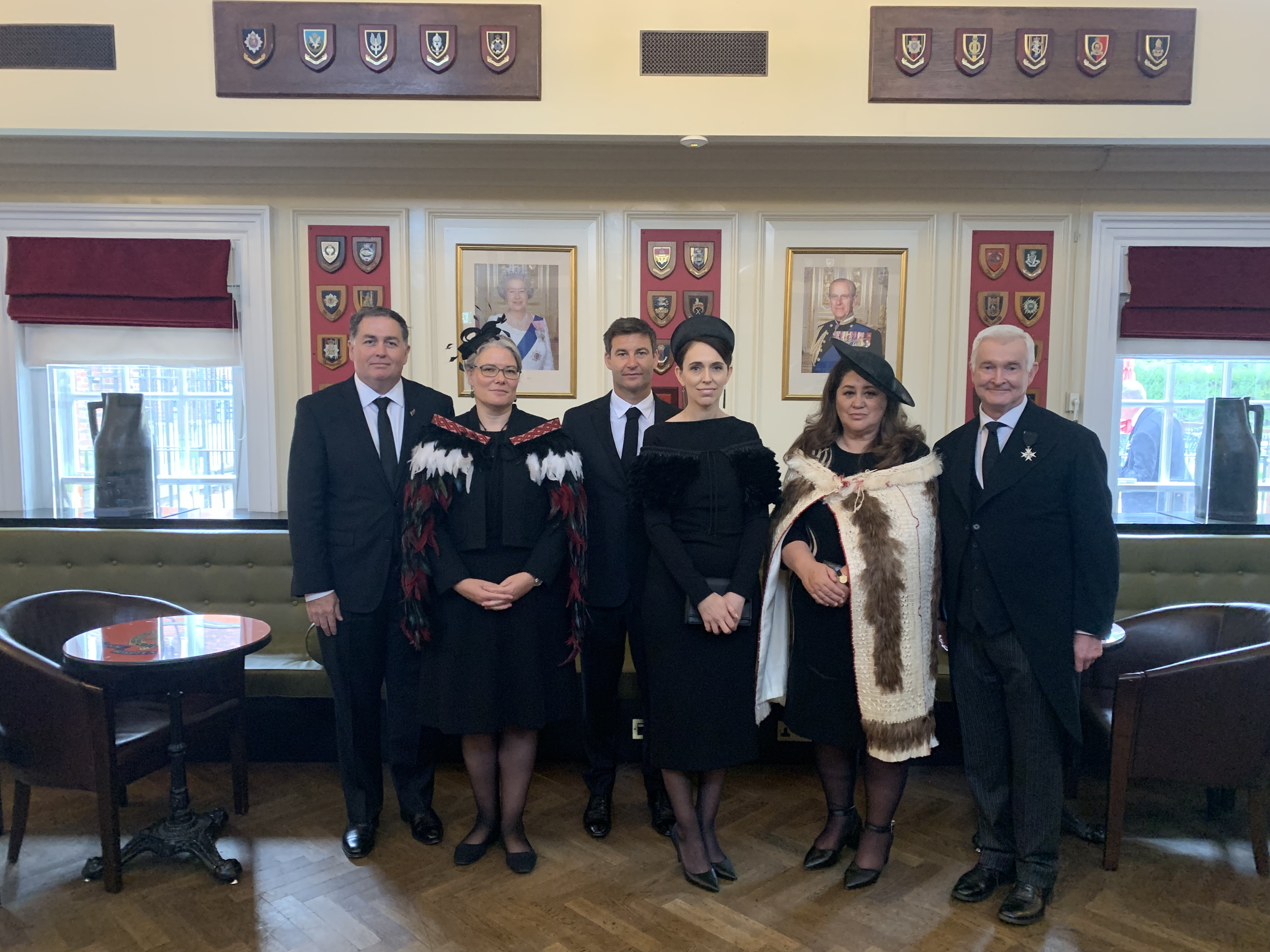
Representatives from New Zealand (Austin's partner and Shannon Austin, Arden's partner Clarke Gayford, Jacinda Ardern, Dame Cindy Kiro and husband Dr Richard Davies) attended the funeral of New Zealand's longest-reigning sovereign.

- Dame Cindy Kiro, Governor-General of New Zealand, and husband Richard Davies
  - Dame Silvia Cartwright, Governor-General of New Zealand (2001–2006)
- Jacinda Ardern, Prime Minister of New Zealand, and partner Clarke Gayford
- Mark Brown, Prime Minister of the Cook Islands
- Dalton Tagelagi, Premier of Niue
- Tūheitia, the Māori King, and spouse Makau Ariki Atawhai
- Shannon Austin, acting New Zealand high commissioner to the United Kingdom, and spouse
- Willie Apiata, former corporal in the New Zealand Special Air Service and recipient of the Victoria Cross for New Zealand
- Jacinda Amey, recipient of the New Zealand Cross
- Aivale Cole, soprano singer
- Esther Jessop, founder of the Ngāti Rānana cultural group
- Sir Tipene O'Regan, academic and company director
- Dame Kiri Te Kanawa, opera singer
- Hana O'Regan, advocate and academic
- Corey Baker, 2022 UK New Zealander of the Year
- Rebecca Smith, former New Zealand footballer
- Jacqueline Gilbert, entrepreneur and Cambridge University MBA graduate
- Ngaire Woods, Dean of the Blavatnik School of Government at Oxford University

=== Jamaica ===
- Sir Patrick Allen, Governor-General of Jamaica
- Andrew Holness, Prime Minister of Jamaica

=== The Bahamas ===
- Sir Cornelius A. Smith, Governor-General of the Bahamas, and Lady (Clara) Smith
- Philip Davis, Prime Minister of the Bahamas
- Ellison Greenslade, Bahamian high commissioner to the United Kingdom, and Mrs Greenslade

=== Grenada ===
- Dame Cécile La Grenade, Governor-General of Grenada
- Kisha Abba Grant, Grenadian high commissioner to the United Kingdom

=== Papua New Guinea ===
- Sir Bob Dadae, Governor-General of Papua New Guinea
- James Marape, Prime Minister of Papua New Guinea

=== Solomon Islands ===
- Sir David Vunagi, Governor-General of Solomon Islands

=== Tuvalu ===
- Sir Tofiga Vaevalu Falani, Governor-General of Tuvalu
- Kausea Natano, Prime Minister of Tuvalu

=== Saint Lucia ===
- Errol Charles, Acting Governor-General of Saint Lucia
- Ernest Hilaire, Deputy Prime Minister and Minister for Tourism, Investment, Creative Industries, Culture and Information of Saint Lucia
- Anthony Severin, High Commissioner for Saint Lucia to the United Kingdom

=== Saint Vincent and the Grenadines ===
- Dame Susan Dougan, Governor-General of Saint Vincent and the Grenadines

=== Belize ===
- Dame Froyla Tzalam, Governor-General of Belize, and Daniel Mendez

=== Antigua and Barbuda ===
- Sir Rodney Williams, Governor-General of Antigua and Barbuda, and Lady (Sandra) Williams
- Gaston Browne, Prime Minister of Antigua and Barbuda

=== Saint Kitts and Nevis ===
- Denzil Douglas, minister of foreign affairs and former prime minister of Saint Kitts and Nevis

== Other Commonwealth countries ==
=== Royalty ===
- The Sultan of Brunei
  - Prince Abdul Mateen of Brunei
- The King of Lesotho
- The Yang di-Pertuan Agong and Raja Permaisuri Agong of Malaysia
- The King of Tonga
  - Titilupe Fanetupouvava'u Tuita-Tupou Tu'ivakano, Tongan High Commissioner to the United Kingdom

=== Heads of state and government ===
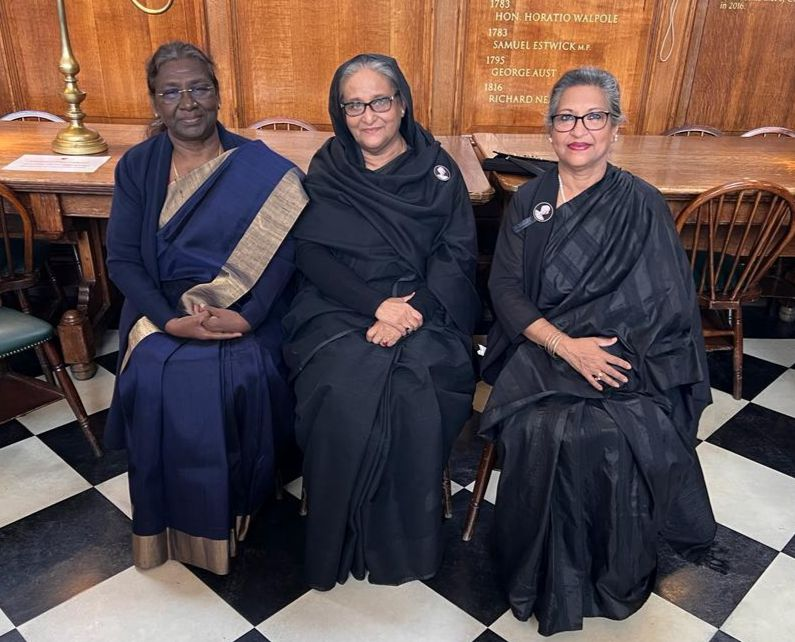
President Droupadi Murmu of India, Prime Minister Sheikh Hasina of Bangladesh, and Hasina's sister Sheikh Rehana, attended the Queen's state funeral

The following Commonwealth heads of state and government attended the funeral:

- Sheikh Hasina, Prime Minister of Bangladesh, and her sister Sheikh Rehana
- Dame Sandra Mason, President and former Governor-General of Barbados
- Joseph Ngute, Prime Minister of Cameroon
- Nicos Anastasiades, President of Cyprus, and First Lady Andri Moustakoudes
- Frank Bainimarama, Prime Minister of Fiji
- Ali Bongo, President of Gabon, and First Lady Sylvia Bongo Ondimba
- Nana Akufo-Addo, President of Ghana, and First Lady Rebecca Akufo-Addo
- Droupadi Murmu, President of India
- William Ruto, President of Kenya, and First Lady Rachel Ruto
- Ibrahim Mohamed Solih, President of the Maldives, and First Lady Fazna Ahmed
- George Vella, President of Malta, and First Lady Miriam Vella
- Pravind Jugnauth, Prime Minister of Mauritius, and Kobita Jugnauth
- Hage Geingob, President of Namibia
- Shehbaz Sharif, Prime Minister of Pakistan
- Paul Kagame, President of Rwanda (Note: Kagame was also the concurrent Commonwealth Chair-in-Office.)
- Tuimalealiʻifano Vaʻaletoʻa Sualauvi II, O le Ao o le Malo of Samoa, and Masiofo Faʻamausili Leinafo
- Wavel Ramkalawan, President of Seychelles, and First Lady Linda Ramkalawan
- Halimah Yacob, President of Singapore, and First Gentleman Mohammed Abdullah Alhabshee
- Cyril Ramaphosa, President of South Africa
- Ranil Wickremesinghe, President of Sri Lanka and First Lady Maithree Wickremesinghe
- Samia Suluhu Hassan, President of Tanzania
- Faure Gnassingbé, President of Togo
- Paula-Mae Weekes, President of Trinidad and Tobago

=== Other national representatives ===
- Joseph Isaac, Speaker of the House of Assembly of Dominica
- Themba Masuku, deputy prime minister and former acting prime minister of Eswatini
- Jitoko Tikolevu, Fijian high commissioner to the United Kingdom
- Hamat Bah, Minister of Tourism and Culture of The Gambia
- Gail Teixeira, Minister of Parliamentary Affairs and Governance of Guyana
- Vinay Mohan Kwatra, Foreign Secretary of India
- Joyce Banda, former president of Malawi
  - Gospel Kazako, Minister for Information and Digitisation of Malawi
- Joaquim Chissano, former president of Mozambique
- Yemi Osinbajo, Vice President of Nigeria
  - Sarafa Tunji Ishola, Nigerian high commissioner to the United Kingdom
- Fatima Bio, First Lady of Sierra Leone
- General Jeje Odongo, Minister of Foreign Affairs of Uganda
- James Harris, Honorary Consul of Vanuatu
- Mulambo Haimbe, Justice Minister of Zambia

=== Commonwealth Secretariat ===
- The Baroness Scotland of Asthal, Secretary-General of the Commonwealth of Nations
- Sir Don McKinnon, former secretary-general of the Commonwealth of Nations

== International ==
=== Royalty ===
- * Present at the committal service at St George's Chapel, Windsor Castle, only
- ** Present at both the state funeral and the committal service
- *** Present at the Buckingham Palace reception on 18 September but not at either the state funeral nor the committal service

==== Members of reigning royal houses ====
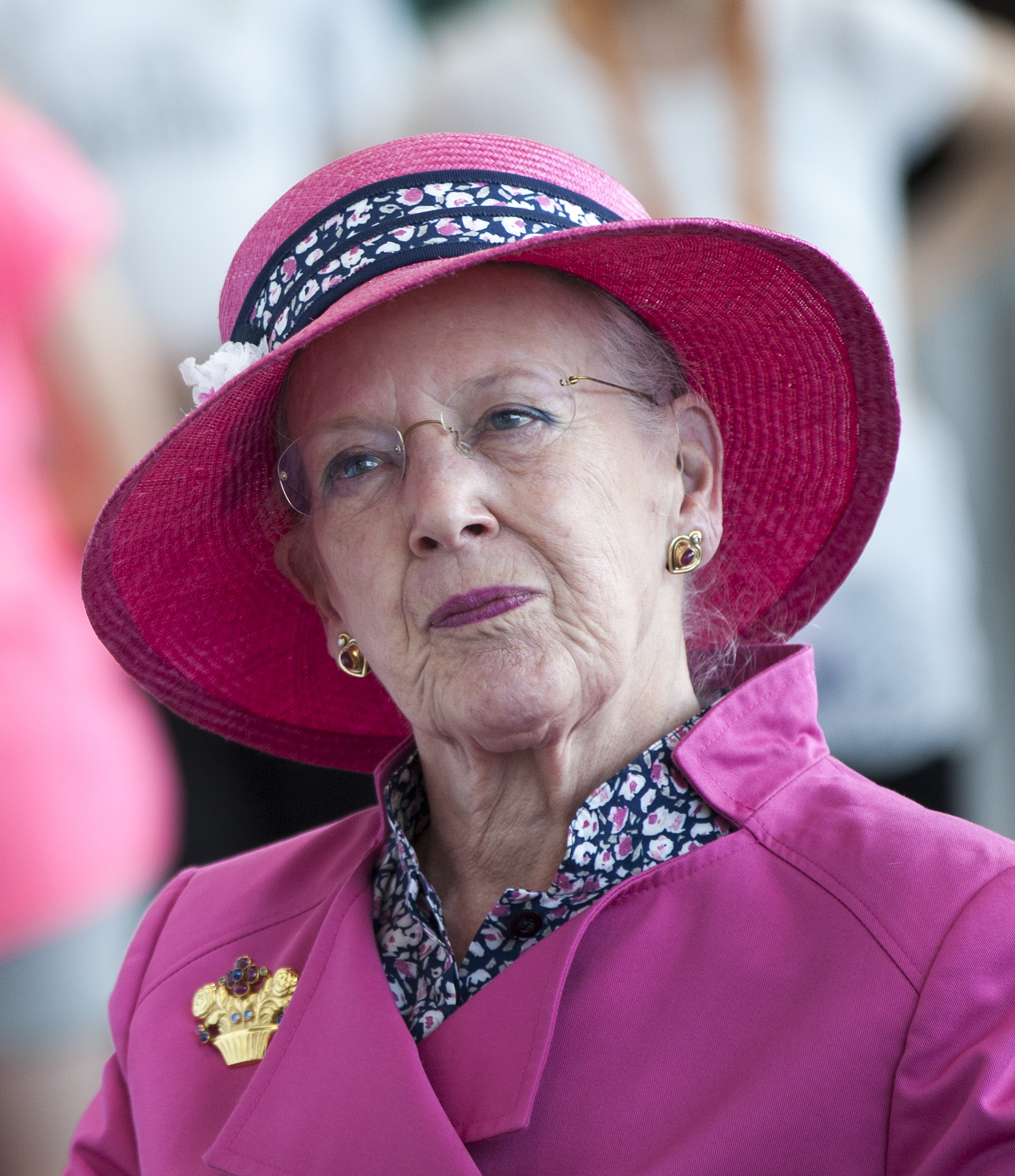
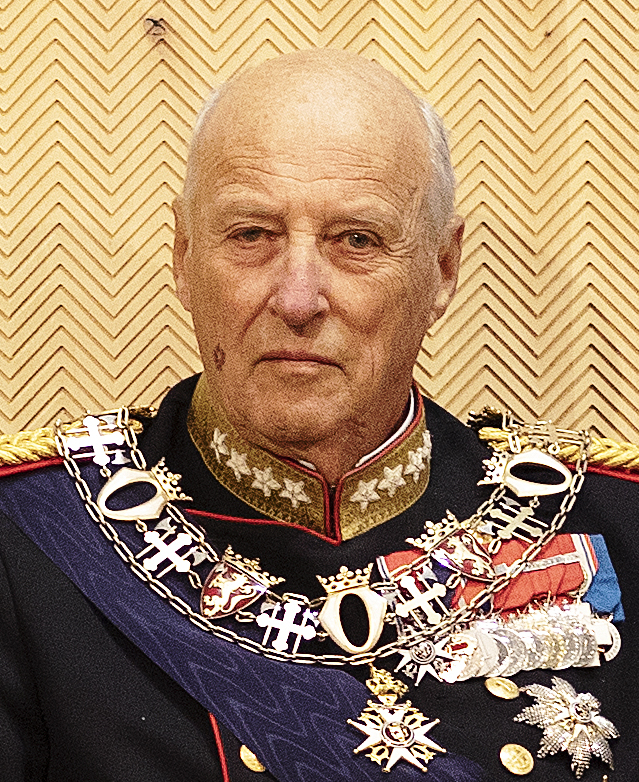
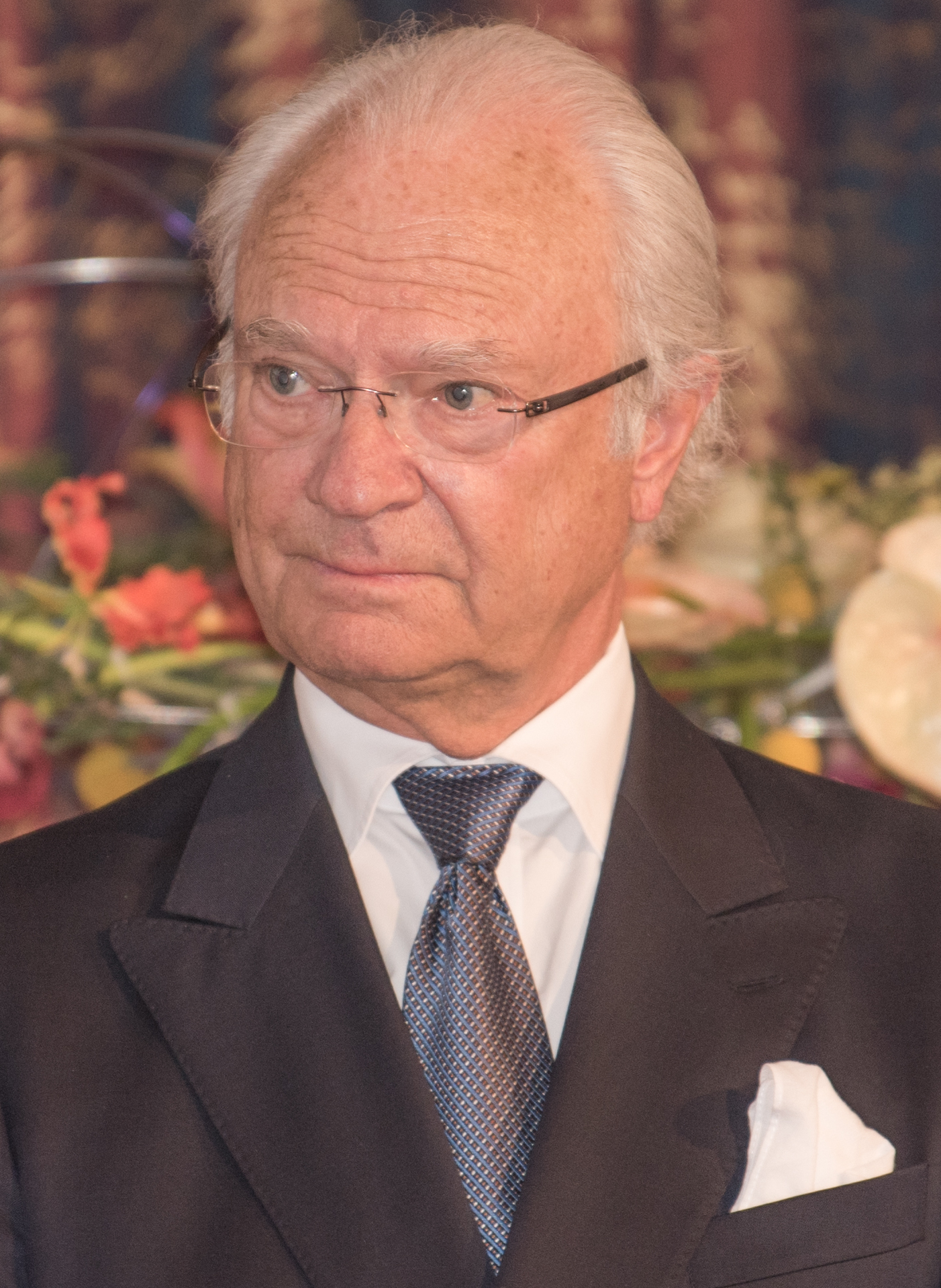
The late Queen's second cousin Harald V of Norway (middle) and third cousins, Margrethe II of Denmark (left) and Carl XVI Gustaf of Sweden (right), attended her funeral.
- The King of Bahrain***
  - The Crown Prince of Bahrain
- The King and Queen of the Belgians, the late Queen's third cousin once removed and his wife**
- The King and Queen of Bhutan
- The Queen of Denmark, the late Queen's third cousin**
  - The Crown Prince of Denmark, the late Queen's third cousin once removed
- The Emperor and Empress of Japan
- The King and Queen of Jordan
  - The Crown Prince of Jordan***
- Princess Haya bint Hussein of Jordan*
- Prince Hassan bin Talal and Princess Sarvath al-Hassan of Jordan*
- The Emir of Kuwait
- The Hereditary Prince and Hereditary Princess of Liechtenstein (representing the Prince of Liechtenstein), the late Queen's seventh cousin twice removed and the late Queen's fourth cousin twice removed
- The Grand Duke and Grand Duchess of Luxembourg, the late Queen's third cousin once removed and his wife
- The Prince and Princess of Monaco, the late Queen's seventh cousin twice removed and his wife
- Prince Moulay Rachid of Morocco (representing the King of Morocco)
- Princess Beatrix of the Netherlands, the late Queen's fifth cousin**
  - The King and Queen of the Netherlands, the late Queen's fifth cousin once removed and his wife**
- The King and Queen of Norway, the late Queen's second cousin and his wife**
- The Sultan of Oman***
- The Emir*** and Sheikha Jawaher bint Hamad of Qatar***
  - Sheikha Amna bint Mohammed of Qatar*
  - Sheikh Hamad bin Abdullah of Qatar*
- Prince Turki bin Mohammed Al Saud of Saudi Arabia (representing the King of Saudi Arabia)
- King Juan Carlos I and Queen Sofía of Spain, the late Queen's third cousins**
  - The King** and Queen of Spain, the late Queen's third cousin once removed and his wife
- The King and Queen of Sweden, the late Queen's third cousin and his wife**
- The Emir of Dubai*** (representing the President of the United Arab Emirates)

==== Members of non-reigning royal houses ====
- The Margravine of Baden, the late Queen's fourth cousin once removed (also wife of the late Queen's nephew by marriage)
  - The Hereditary Prince and Hereditary Princess of Baden, the late Queen's third cousin once removed (also great-nephew by marriage) and his wife
- Tsar Simeon II of Bulgaria, former prime minister of Bulgaria, the late Queen's fourth cousin once removed
- Queen Anne-Marie of the Hellenes, the late Queen's third cousin
  - Crown Prince Pavlos and Crown Princess Marie-Chantal of Greece, the late Queen's third cousin once removed and his wife
  - Princess Theodora of Greece and Denmark, the late Queen's third cousin once removed and Goddaughter*
- The Landgrave and Landgravine of Hesse, the late Queen's third cousin once removed and his wife
- The Prince and Princess of Hohenlohe-Langenburg, the late Queen's third cousin once removed (also great-nephew by marriage) and his wife
- Princess Xenia of Hohenlohe-Langenburg, the late Queen's third cousin once removed (also great-niece by marriage)
- The Custodian of the Crown of Romania and Prince Radu of Romania, the late Queen's third cousin once removed and her husband
- Crown Prince Alexander and Crown Princess Katherine of Yugoslavia, the late Queen's third cousin once removed and his wife

=== Heads of state and government ===
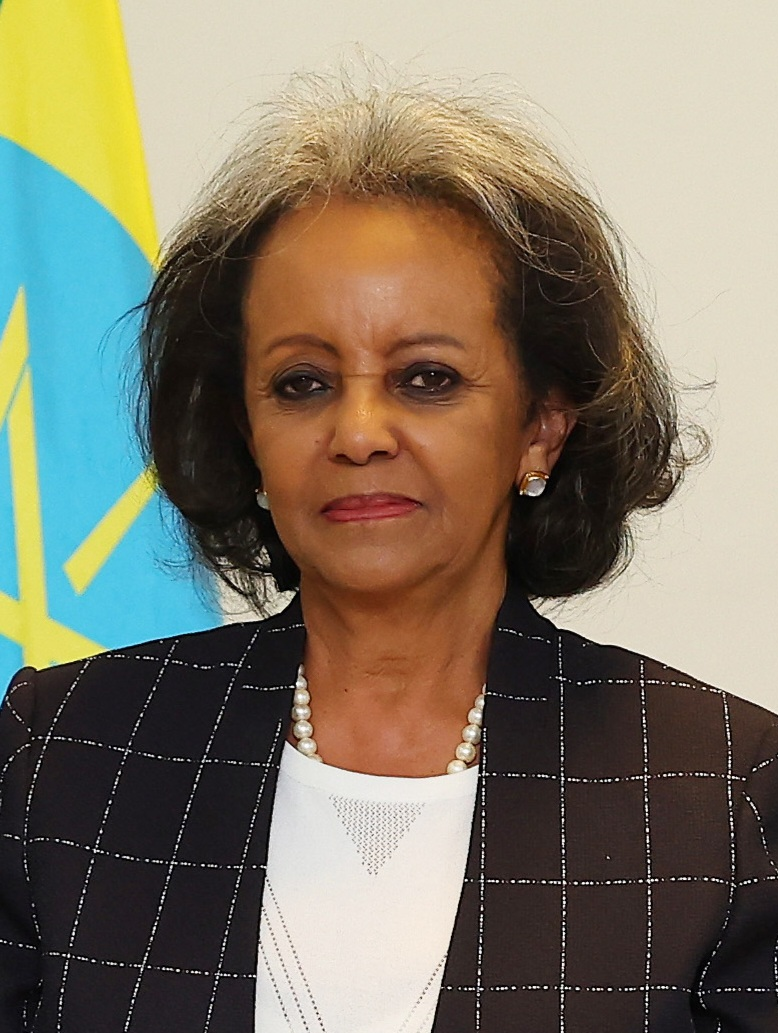
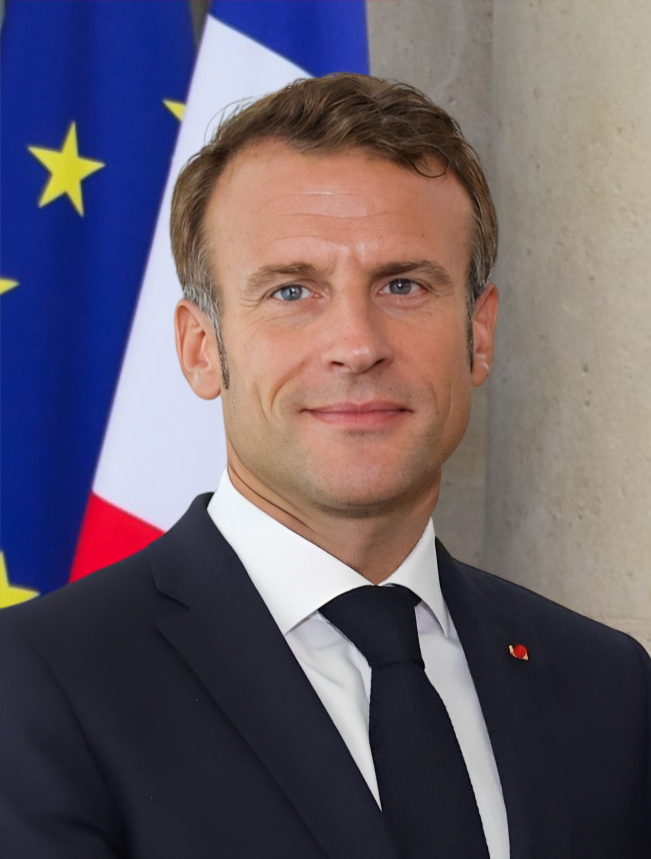
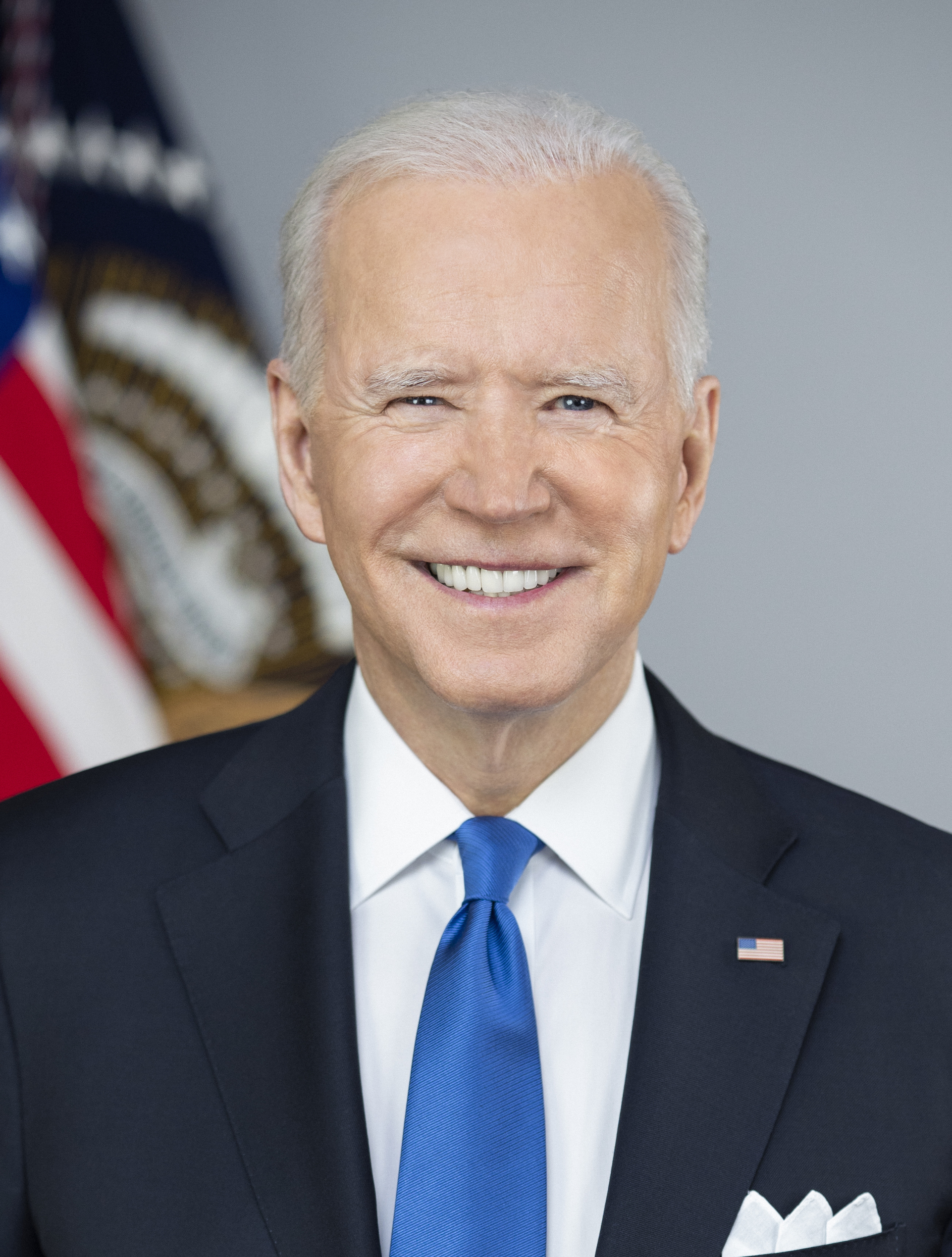
Ethiopian President Sahle-Work Zewde (left), French President and Andorran Co-Prince Emmanuel Macron (middle) and US President Joe Biden (right) attended the funeral.
- Bajram Begaj, President of Albania, and First Lady Armanda Begaj
- Aïmene Benabderrahmane, Prime Minister of Algeria
- Archbishop Joan Enric Vives i Sicília, Co-Prince of Andorra
- Vahagn Khachaturyan, President of Armenia
- Alexander Van der Bellen, President of Austria, and First Lady Doris Schmidauer
- Jair Bolsonaro, President of Brazil, and First Lady Michelle Bolsonaro
- Rumen Radev, President of Bulgaria, and First Lady Desislava Radeva
- Azali Assoumani, President of Comoros, and First Lady Ambari Assoumani
- Denis Sassou Nguesso, President of the Republic of the Congo
- Zoran Milanović, President of Croatia, and First Lady Sanja Musić Milanović
- Petr Fiala, Prime Minister of the Czech Republic
- Mostafa Madbouly, Prime Minister of Egypt
- Alar Karis, President of Estonia, and First Lady Sirje Karis
- Sahle-Work Zewde, President of Ethiopia
- Sauli Niinistö, President of Finland, and First Lady Jenni Haukio
- Emmanuel Macron, President of France and Co-Prince of Andorra, and First Lady Brigitte Macron
- Salome Zourabichvili, President of Georgia
- Frank-Walter Steinmeier, President of Germany, and First Lady Elke Büdenbender
- Katerina Sakellaropoulou, President of Greece
- Nuno Gomes Nabiam, Prime Minister of Guinea-Bissau
- Katalin Novák, President of Hungary, and First Gentleman István Attila Veres
- Guðni Th. Jóhannesson, President of Iceland, and First Lady Eliza Reid
- Michael D. Higgins, President of Ireland, and his spouse Sabina Higgins
  - Micheál Martin, Taoiseach of Ireland, and Mary O'Shea
- Isaac Herzog, President of Israel, and First Lady Michal Herzog
- Sergio Mattarella, President of Italy, and de facto First Lady Laura Mattarella
- Yoon Suk Yeol, President of South Korea, and First Lady Kim Keon-hee
- Vjosa Osmani, President of Kosovo, and First Gentleman Prindon Sadriu
- Egils Levits, President of Latvia, and First Lady Andra Levite
- Najib Mikati, Prime Minister of Lebanon, and May Mikati
- Gitanas Nausėda, President of Lithuania, and First Lady Diana Nausėdienė
- Maia Sandu, President of Moldova
- Luvsannamsrain Oyun-Erdene, Prime Minister of Mongolia
- Milo Đukanović, President of Montenegro, and First Lady Lidija Đukanović
- Ouhoumoudou Mahamadou, Prime Minister of Niger
- Stevo Pendarovski, President of North Macedonia, and First Lady Elizabeta Gjorgievska
- Mohammad Shtayyeh, Prime Minister of Palestine
- Andrzej Duda, President of Poland, and First Lady Agata Kornhauser-Duda
- Marcelo Rebelo de Sousa, President of Portugal
- Klaus Iohannis, President of Romania, and First Lady Carmen Iohannis
- Oscar Mina and Paolo Rondelli, Captains Regent of San Marino
- Macky Sall, President of Senegal (Note: Sall was also the concurrent Chairperson of the African Union.)
- Ana Brnabić, Prime Minister of Serbia, and her partner Milica Đurđić
- Zuzana Čaputová, President of Slovakia
- Borut Pahor, President of Slovenia
- Hassan Sheikh Mohamud, President of Somalia
- Abdel Fattah al-Burhan, Chairman of the Transitional Sovereignty Council of Sudan
- Ignazio Cassis, President and Head of the Federal Department of Foreign Affairs of Switzerland
- Denys Shmyhal, Prime Minister of Ukraine
- Joe Biden, President of the United States, and First Lady Jill Biden

=== Foreign ministers ===
- Bisera Turković, Minister of Foreign Affairs of Bosnia and Herzegovina
- Antonia Urrejola, Minister of Foreign Affairs of Chile
- Álvaro Leyva, Minister of Foreign Affairs of Colombia
- Richard Randriamandrato, Minister of Foreign Affairs of Madagascar
- Marcelo Ebrard, Minister of Foreign Affairs of Mexico, and his spouse Rosalinda Bueso
- Narayan Khadka, Minister of Foreign Affairs of Nepal
- Badr bin Hamad Al Busaidi, Minister of Foreign Affairs of Oman
- José Manuel Albares, Minister of Foreign Affairs of Spain
- Mevlüt Çavuşoğlu, Minister of Foreign Affairs of Turkey
- Reem Al Hashimi, Minister of State for International Cooperation of the United Arab Emirates
- Francisco Bustillo, Minister of Foreign Affairs of Uruguay
- Archbishop Paul R. Gallagher, Secretary for Relations with States and International Organizations of the Holy See
- Bùi Thanh Sơn, Minister of Foreign Affairs of Vietnam
- Frederick Shava, Minister of Foreign Affairs and International Trade of Zimbabwe

=== Ambassadors ===
- Carles Jordana, Andorran Ambassador to the United Kingdom
- Geraldo Nunda, Angolan Ambassador to the United Kingdom
- Javier Esteban Figueroa, Argentine Ambassador to the United Kingdom
- Vanja Filipović, Bosnian Ambassador to the United Kingdom
- Kan Pharidh, Cambodian Ambassador to the United Kingdom
- Rafael Ortiz Fábrega, Costa Rican Ambassador to the United Kingdom
- Igor Pokaz, Croatian Ambassador to the United Kingdom
- Ayeid Mousseid Yahya, Djiboutian Ambassador to the United Kingdom
- Antonito de Araújo, Timorese Chargé d'affaires to the United Kingdom
- Sebastián Corral, Ecuadorian Ambassador to the United Kingdom
- Vanessa Interiano, Salvadoran Ambassador to the United Kingdom
- Estifanos Habtemariam Ghebreyesus, Eritrean Ambassador to the United Kingdom
- José Alberto Briz Gutiérrez, Guatemalan Ambassador to the United Kingdom
- Euvrard Saint Amand, Haitian Ambassador to the United Kingdom
- Iván Romero-Martínez, Honduran Ambassador to the United Kingdom
- Desra Percaya, Indonesian Ambassador to the United Kingdom
- Mehdi Hosseini Matin, Iranian Chargé d'affaires to the United Kingdom (Note: The governments of Iran, North Korea, and Nicaragua were permitted to be represented only at the ambassadorial level, and to not send their respective heads of state.)
- Mohammad Jaafar Al-Sadr, Iraqi Ambassador to the United Kingdom
- Choe Il, North Korean Ambassador to the United Kingdom
- Edil Baisalov, Kyrgyzstani Ambassador to the United Kingdom
- Phongsavanh Sisoulath, Laotian Ambassador to the United Kingdom
- Gurly Gibson-Schwarz, Liberian Ambassador to the United Kingdom
- Angela Ponomariov, Moldovan Ambassador to the United Kingdom
- Hakim Hajoui, Moroccan Ambassador to the United Kingdom
- Gyan Chandra Acharya, Nepali Ambassador to the United Kingdom
- Guisell Morales Echaverry, Nicaraguan Ambassador to the United Kingdom
- Hussein Mohammed Muqaibel, Omani Chargé d'affaires to the United Kingdom
- Husam Zomlot, Palestinian Ambassador to the United Kingdom
- Natalia Royo de Hagerman, Panamanian Ambassador to the United Kingdom
- Genaro Pappalardo, Paraguayan Ambassador to the United Kingdom
- Juan Carlos Gamarra Skeels, Peruvian Ambassador to the United Kingdom
- Pisanu Suvanajata, Thai Ambassador to the United Kingdom
- César Rodríguez-Zavalla, Uruguayan Ambassador to the United Kingdom

=== Other national representatives ===
- Sahiba Gafarova, Chairman of the National Assembly of Azerbaijan
- Djerassem Le Bemadjiel, Minister of Petroleum and Energy of Chad
- Wang Qishan, Vice President of the People's Republic of China
  - Liu Xiaoming, Special Representative of the Chinese Government on Korean Peninsula Affairs (former PRC ambassador to the UK)
- Verónica Alcocer, First Lady of Colombia
- Christophe Mboso N'Kodia Pwanga, President of the National Assembly of the Democratic Republic of the Congo
- Salvador Valdés Mesa, Vice President of Cuba
- Eduardo Estrella, President of the Senate of the Dominican Republic
- Kabele Soumah, Secretary General for the Ministry of Foreign Affairs of Guinea
- Abdourahmane Cissé, Secretary General of the Presidency of the Ivory Coast
- Mäulen Äşimbaev, Chair of the Senate of Kazakhstan
- Adylbek Kasymaliev, First Deputy Chairman of the Cabinet of Ministers of Kyrgyzstan
- Musa Al-Koni, Deputy Chairman of the Presidential Council of Libya
- Diéminatou Sangaré, Minister for Health of Mali
- Arístides Royo, Minister for Canal Affairs and former president of Panama
- Irene Marcos, sister of President Bongbong Marcos of the Philippines
- Barnaba Marial Benjamin, Minister of Presidential Affairs of South Sudan
- Mustapha Ferjani, minister councillor to the president of Tunisia
- Olena Zelenska, First Lady of Ukraine
- Sodiq Safoyev, First Deputy Chairperson of the Senate of Uzbekistan
- Ahmed Albably, Consul at the Yemeni Embassy in the United Kingdom

=== Other subnational representatives ===
- Nechirvan Barzani, President of Kurdistan Region (Iraq)

== Faith representatives ==
Information in this section taken from the official order of service.

=== Christian ===
==== England ====
- Agu Irukwu, Senior Pastor of Jesus House UK
- Glyn Barrett, National Leader of Assemblies of God
- Helen Cameron, Moderator of the Free Churches Group
- Shermara Fletcher, Principal Officer for Pentecostal and Charismatic Relations of Churches Together in England
- Brian Peddle, General of the Salvation Army
- Graham Thompson, President of the Methodist Conference
- Archbishop Angaelos of the Coptic Orthodox Church in Great Britain
- Vincent Nichols, Roman Catholic Cardinal and Archbishop of Westminster
- Archbishop Nikitas, Greek Orthodox Archbishop of Thyateira and Great Britain

==== Scotland ====
- Iain Greenshields, Moderator of the General Assembly of the Church of Scotland
- Leo Cushley, Roman Catholic Archbishop of St Andrews and Edinburgh
- Mark Strange, Primus of the Scottish Episcopal Church

==== Wales ====
- Simon Walkling, President of the Free Church Council of Wales
- Andrew John, Archbishop of Wales
- Mark O'Toole, Roman Catholic Archbishop of Cardiff

==== Northern Ireland ====
- David Nixon, President of the Methodist Church in Ireland
- Ian Brown, Lead Minister of Martyrs Memorial Free Presbyterian Church
- John Kirkpatrick, Moderator of the Presbyterian Church in Ireland
- Eamon Martin, Roman Catholic Archbishop of Armagh and Primate of All Ireland
- John McDowell, Anglican Archbishop of Armagh and Primate of All Ireland and Metropolitan

==== Royal Household ====
- David Fergusson, Dean of the Thistle and of the Chapel Royal in Scotland
- Canon Paul Wright, Sub-Dean of His Majesty's Chapels Royal
- Dame Sarah Mullally, Bishop of London and Dean of His Majesty's Chapels Royal
- David Conner, Dean of Windsor
- James Newcome, Clerk of the Closet
- John Inge, Bishop of Worcester and Lord High Almoner

==== Westminster Abbey and others ====
- Justin Welby, Archbishop of Canterbury, Primate of All England and Metropolitan
  - The Lord Williams of Oystermouth, former Archbishop of Canterbury
- Stephen Cottrell, Archbishop of York, Primate of England and Metropolitan
  - The Lord and Lady Sentamu, former Archbishop of York and his wife
- David Hoyle, Dean of Westminster
- David Stanton, Sub-Dean and Canon Treasurer
- Tricia Hillas, Canon Steward and Archdeacon of Westminster
- James Hawkey, Canon Theologian and Almoner
- Anthony Ball, Canon of Westminster and Rector of St. Margaret's Church
- Mark Birch, Minor Canon and Precentor
- Robert Latham, Minor Canon and Sacrist

=== Other religions ===
- Bogoda Seelawimala Thera, Representative of the Buddhist community
- The Lord Singh of Wimbledon, Representative of the Sikh community
- Rajnish Kashyap, General Secretary of Hindu Council UK
- Shirin Fozdar-Faroudi, Representative of the Bahá'í community
- Nemu Chandaria, Representative of the Jain community
- Malcolm Deboo, Representative of the Zoroastrian community
- Aliya Azam, Interfaith Co-ordinator of the Al-Khoei Foundation
- Shaykh Asim Yusuf, Muslim Scholar, representing the Sunni Muslim community
- Imam Sayed Ali Abbas Razawi, director-general and chief imam, Scottish Ahlul Bayt Society, representing the Shia Muslim community
- Ephraim Mirvis, Chief Rabbi of the United Hebrew Congregations of the Commonwealth
- Charley Baginsky, chief executive officer of Liberal Judaism
- Marie van der Zyl, President of the Board of Deputies of British Jews

== International organisations ==
- Charles Michel, President of the European Council
- Ursula von der Leyen, President of the European Commission
- Kitack Lim, secretary general of the International Maritime Organisation
- Earle Courtenay Rattray, Chief of Staff to the secretary general of the United Nations
- Jens Stoltenberg, Secretary General of NATO
- Thomas Bach, President of the International Olympic Committee

== Other dignitaries ==
- Bear Grylls, Chief Scout of The Scout Association
- Amanda Medler, Chief Guide of Girlguiding
- David Morgan-Hewitt, managing director of The Goring Hotel
- Prince Rahim Aga Khan* (representing the Aga Khan)
- The Duchess of Westminster, the late Queen's fifth cousin once removed*
- The Duke and Duchess of Devonshire, former Representative at Ascot and his wife*
- The Duke and Duchess of Richmond, Lennox, and Gordon*
- The Earl and Countess of Derby*
- Sir Nicholas Soames*
- Sir Jackie Stewart*
- John Warren, racing manager, and Lady Carolyn Warren
- Sir Francis Brooke Bt., His Majesty's Representative at Ascot, and Lady (Katherine) Brooke*
- Sandy Dudgeon, Senior Steward at The Jockey Club
- Simon Brooks-Ward, director of the Royal Windsor Horse Show and other equestrian events*
- Nicky Henderson, racehorse trainer, and Diana Henderson*
- Andrew Balding, racehorse trainer, and Anna Lisa Balding*
- William Haggas, racehorse trainer, and Maureen Haggas*
- John Gosden, racehorse trainer, and Rachel Hood*
- Sir Michael Stoute, racehorse trainer*
- Richard Hannon Jr., racehorse trainer*
- Roger Charlton, racehorse trainer*
- Michael Bell, racehorse trainer*
- Ryan Moore, jockey
- Sue Magnier, thoroughbred owner and breeder, and her daughter Kate Wachman*
- David Hayes, Australian racehorse trainer, and Prue Hayes
- Monty Roberts, American horse trainer, and Pat Roberts*
- Sarah Rowland Jones, Dean of St Davids Cathedral
- Natalie Queiroz, campaigner against knife crime
- Hsien Chew, founder of Proud Voices, an LGBT choir network
- Pranav Bhanot, lawyer who provided assistance and free meal delivery during the COVID-19 pandemic

== Absences ==
- Otumfuo Nana Osei Tutu II, Asantehene of Asante and Kumasehene of Kumasi, was invited but was unable to attend.
- Lech Wałęsa, former president of Poland and a Nobel Peace Prize laureate, was invited but did not attend due to his poor health.
- Recep Tayyip Erdoğan, President of Turkey, was invited but declined to attend due to security concerns, instead being in New York City for the 77th session of the United Nations General Assembly on the day of the funeral.

=== Invitations rescinded ===
- The Crown Princess of Denmark was uninvited after initially being invited. The original invitation was later reported to be issued in error.
- The Crown Prince of Saudi Arabia was initially invited to deliver his condolences in person to the royal family. The invitation was later withdrawn by the government of Saudi Arabia.

=== Uninvited states ===
Six UN member states were not invited to be represented at the funeral due to poor or non-existing diplomatic relations between their respective governments and that of the United Kingdom. Belarus and Russia were both excluded due to their involvement in the Russian invasion of Ukraine. The de facto governments of Taliban-led Afghanistan, Myanmar, Syria under the Assad regime and Venezuela were also not invited as they did not maintain any official relations with the UK government.

The Republic of China (Taiwan) was not invited officially to the funeral because the UK has inactive official diplomatic relations with the ROC. However, Kelly Hsieh, Taiwan's representative to the UK, was "specially invited" by the British government to add Taiwan's condolences at Lancaster House in London. The Ministry of Foreign Affairs described it as "... the same courtesies as those afforded to heads of state, representatives, and members of royal households from other countries ..."
