= Kelly Hsieh =

Taiwanese politician

- 謝武樵
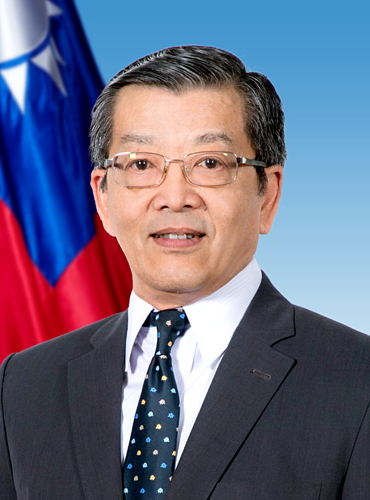

ROC Representative to the United Kingdom
- Incumbent
- Assumed office July 2020
- Preceded by: David Lin

Deputy Minister of Foreign Affairs of the Republic of China
- In office April 2018 – July 2020 Serving with Hsu Szu-chien
- Minister: Joseph Wu
- Vice: Miguel Tsao
- Succeeded by: Tseng Hou-jen

ROC Representative to Russia
- In office 2017–2018

ROC Representative to Thailand
- In office 2015–2017
- Succeeded by: Tung Chen-yuan

Personal details
- Education: National Chengchi University (BA)

Hsieh Wu-ch'iao (Chinese: 謝武樵; pinyin: Xiè Wǔqiáo), also known as Kelly Hsieh, is a Taiwanese politician and diplomat who has served as the Representative to the United Kingdom for Taiwan since 24 July 2020.

== Education ==
Hsieh obtained his bachelor's degree in diplomacy from National Chengchi University.

== Representative to the United Kingdom ==
Hsieh succeeded David Lin as Taiwan's representative to the United Kingdom on the 24th of July 2020 after Lin's retirement announcement from the position the month prior in June.

=== Invitation to the state funeral of Elizabeth II ===
Despite Taiwan not having any official diplomatic relations with the United Kingdom, Hsieh, as the ROC's representative to the United Kingdom was "specially invited" by the British government to add Taiwan's condolences to the condolence book of Elizabeth II at Lancaster House in London on the 18th of September 2022.
