= Shen Lyu-shun =

Taiwanese diplomat (1949–2023)

- 沈呂巡
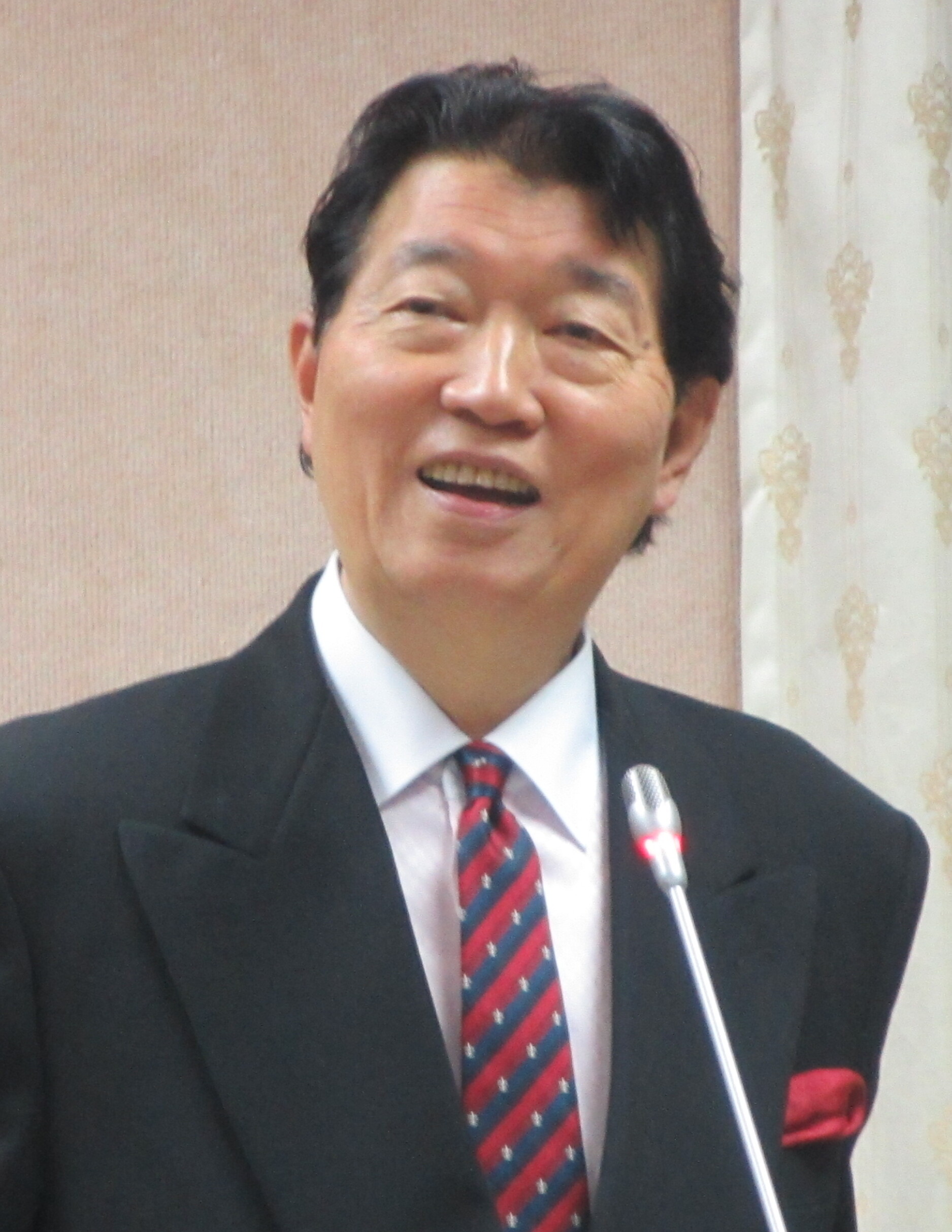
- Shen in 2013

ROC Representative to the United States
- In office 1 April 2014 – 5 June 2016
- Preceded by: King Pu-tsung
- Succeeded by: Stanley Kao

ROC Representative to the United Kingdom
- In office 15 December 2011 – 31 March 2014
- Preceded by: Katharine Chang
- Succeeded by: Liu Chih-kung

Deputy Minister of Foreign Affairs
- In office 21 October 2009 – 15 December 2011
- Minister: Timothy Yang

ROC Representative to the European Union and Belgium
- In office 2008–2009
- Preceded by: Michael Kau
- Succeeded by: David Lin

ROC Deputy Representative to the United States
- In office 1999–2003 Serving with Lee Ying-yuan
- Representative: Stephen S. F. Chen; Chen Chien-jen
- Succeeded by: Michael Tsai

Personal details
- Born: 12 November 1949 Taipei, Taiwan
- Died: 6 January 2023 (aged 73) Taipei, Taiwan
- Party: Kuomintang
- Spouse: Christine Shen
- Relations: Shen Baozhen (ancestor)
- Education: National Chung Hsing University (BA) University of Pennsylvania (MA, PhD)

Chinese name
- Traditional Chinese: 沈呂巡
- Simplified Chinese: 沈吕巡
Transcriptions
Standard Mandarin
- Hanyu Pinyin: Shěn Lǚxún
- IPA: [ʂə̀n lỳ.ɕwə̌n]
Southern Min
- Hokkien POJ: Sím Lū-sûn

Shen Lyu-shun (Chinese: 沈呂巡; pinyin: Shěn Lǚxún; 12 November 1949 – 6 January 2023) was a Taiwanese diplomat who served at posts in the United States and Europe. He also served in the Department of North American Affairs in the Taiwanese Ministry of Foreign Affairs. He was best known as serving as the representative of the Republic of China to the United States from 2014 to 2016.

== Early life and education ==
Shen was born on 12 November 1949 in Taipei, Taiwan. He was a sixth generation descendant of the famous Qing official Shen Baozhen. He also had other relatives who served in Taiwanese diplomatic posts in several countries, including in Brazil, Japan, Iran, Niger, and Rwanda.

After high school, Shen graduated from National Chung Hsing University with an LL.B. in 1972. He then was awarded the KMT's Sun Yat-sen Scholarship and completed advanced studies in international relations in the United States. He earned a Master of Arts (M.A.) in 1979 and his Ph.D. in international relations in 1981 from the University of Pennsylvania. His doctoral dissertation was titled, "Peking's Policy Toward Taiwan in the 1970s: A Study from the Strategic Perspective".

== Early diplomatic career ==
After receiving his PhD, Shen stayed in the U.S., serving as a staff consultant at the Coordination Council for North American Affairs (CCNAA) from 1982 to 1988. In 1988, he began working in the Taiwanese Ministry of Foreign Affairs (MOFA), where he worked in the Department of North American Affairs until 1990. Subsequently, Shen returned to the U.S., where he became Director General at the CCNAA in Kansas City from 1991 through 1993, followed by serving as the Divisional Director, Secretariat & Public Affairs at Taipei Economic and Cultural Representative Office in the United States from 1993 to 1996. He then returned to Taiwan, where he became Director General in the Department of North American Affairs at MOFA from 1996 to 1999.

== Diplomatic career in Europe ==
Shen served as Director-General of the Taipei Economic and Cultural Office in Geneva, Switzerland from 2003 to 2008. During Shen's time there, the office filed a lawsuit against the International Organization for Standardization, based in Geneva, regarding ISO 3166-2:CN code, which listed Taiwan as a province of China. He also advocated for Taiwan's representation at the World Health Assembly, also based in Geneva. Between 2008 and 2009, Shen also served as Representative at the Taipei Representative Office in the EU and Belgium. Subsequently, from 2009 and 2011, Shen was Deputy Minister of Foreign Affairs at the Taiwanese MOFA.

Shen was subsequently Representative at the Taipei Representative Office in the United Kingdom from December 2011 until 2014, where he worked to expand investment in developing nations, bilateral economic agreements, and promoting Taiwan Academy language and cultural initiatives in the UK.

== Representative to the United States ==
Shen was named the ROC representative to the United States in March 2014, and made his first official trip there on 1 April. Speaking at the United States Capitol in Washington, D.C., on 7 May 2014, Shen lauded Taiwan's ability in playing a greater role in the American pivot to Asia and helping maintain regional peace for the benefit for all. He added that closer Taiwan–United States relations and improved cross-strait relations would create a win-win outcome for Taiwan, the United States, and Mainland China. Shen made the address during an event organised by the Atlantic Council as part of the celebration of the 35th anniversary of the Taiwan Relations Act.

On 4 December 2014, on behalf of the Government of the Republic of China, Shen donated US$1 million to the Centers for Disease Control and Prevention Foundation to fight Ebola virus disease in West Africa. According to the Ministry of Foreign Affairs, Taiwan also donated medical protective gear, coveralls and surgical masks through a cooperation program with the United States.

On 1 January 2015, the flag of the Republic of China was raised at Twin Oaks in Washington, D.C. reportedly for the first time since the end of diplomatic relations in 1979. Shen attended the ceremony, and later stated that the United States was not told in advance that it would occur. The People's Republic of China lodged a protest with the United States over the incident, but Shen defended the flag-raising as having occurred due to "precedent," as the flag was raised during Double Ten Day celebrations in 2014. It was later reported that American government officials asked President Ma Ying-jeou to replace Shen. Shen submitted his resignation to Ma on 15 April 2016, but it was not approved until 26 May, after Tsai Ing-wen had taken office.

Shen died in New Taipei, Taiwan, on 6 January 2023, at age 73.
