= David Lin =

Taiwanese politician

David Lin Lin Yung-lo
- 林永樂
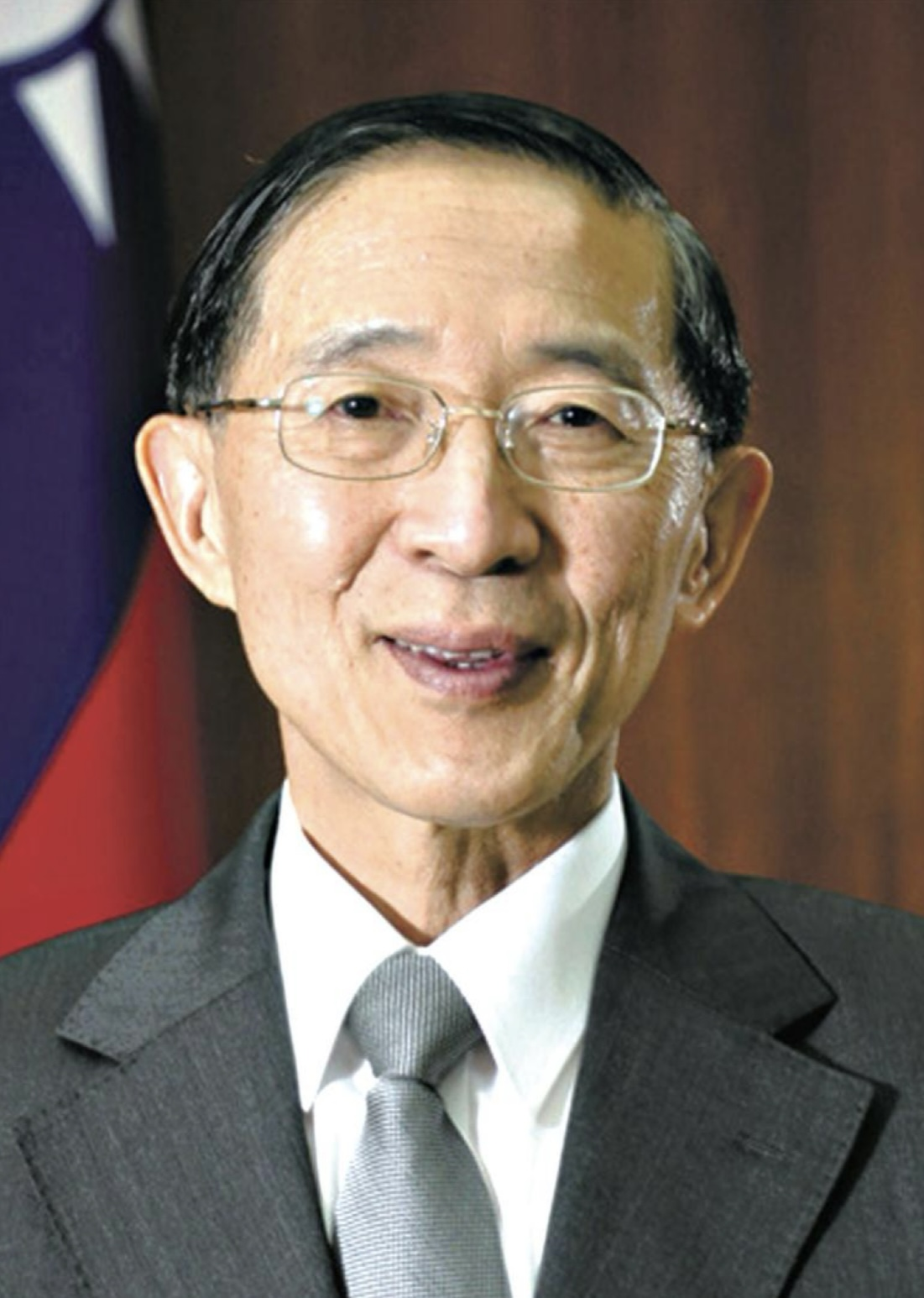
- Official portrait, 2012

21st Minister of Foreign Affairs
- In office 27 September 2012 – 20 May 2016
- Premier: Chen Chun; Jiang Yi-huah; Mao Chi-kuo; Chang San-cheng
- Deputy: Simon Ko; Joseph Shih; Andrew Kao; Bruce Linghu
- Vice Minister: Vanessa Shih
- Preceded by: Timothy Yang
- Succeeded by: David Lee

Taiwanese Representative to European Union and Belgium
- In office May 2010 - September 2012
- Preceded by: Shen Lyu-shun
- Succeeded by: Tung Kuo-yu

Vice Minister of Foreign Affairs
- In office 2008–2010
- Minister: Francisco Ou; Timothy Yang

Taiwanese Representative to Indonesia
- In office 2003 - 2007
- Succeeded by: Timothy Yang

Taiwanese Ambassador to Grenada
- In office 1997 - 2001

Personal details
- Born: 10 March 1950 (age 76) Taiwan
- Education: National Chengchi University (BA, MA); Georgetown University (MS)

Lin Yung-lo (Chinese: 林永樂; pinyin: Lín Yǒnglè; born 10 March 1950), also known as David Lin, is a Taiwanese politician who was the Minister of Foreign Affairs of Taiwan. Since 2023, he has been serving as the chairman of the Association of Foreign Relations (AFR) since his election in late 2022.

== Early life and education ==
Lin graduated with a B.A. and an M.A. in commerce from National Chengchi University. He then earned a Master of Science (M.S.) in foreign service from Georgetown University at the Walsh School of Foreign Service in 1990.

He was also a member of the Taipei Toastmasters club.

== ROC Foreign Ministry ==
Lin was appointed to be the Minister of Foreign Affairs of the Republic of China on 27 September 2012 replacing the incumbent Minister Timothy Yang after the ROC cabinet reshuffle.

Regarding the refusal of Republic of China delegates to attend the Jakarta International Defense Dialogue in March 2013, Lin said the Ministry of Foreign Affairs (MOFA) needed to seek clarification from Indonesia on the withdrawal of the invitation, noting it may have followed verbal objections from Beijing.

After the signing of a fisheries agreement between Taiwan and Japan on April 10, 2013, Lin stated that the agreement did not address competing sovereignty claims over the Diaoyutai Islands, as both sides had set aside the dispute at that time.

In response to the establishment of a mainland Chinese trade mission in São Tomé and Príncipe in November 2013, Lin said the move was unlikely to affect Taiwan’s diplomatic relations with the country, while noting that MOFA would review its assistance programs as needed.

=== Taiwanese fisherman shooting incident ===
After a May 2013 shooting involving a Taiwanese fisherman and a Philippine government vessel, Lin demanded an apology, compensation, and accountability, and said the incident violated international law.

On May 11, 2013, Lin met with President Ma Ying-jeou and Defense Minister Kao Hua-chu, announcing a 72-hour deadline for the Philippines to apologize and prosecute those responsible, with potential retaliatory measures if demands were not met.

== Representative to the United Kingdom ==
Lin was appointed as Taiwan's representative to the United Kingdom, a post then held by Liu Chih-kung, shortly after stepping down as foreign minister. He retired from the position in June 2020, and was succeeded by Kelly Hsieh.
