= Taiwan–United Kingdom relations =

- Taiwan: United Kingdom

Diplomatic mission
- Taipei Representative Office in the U.K.: British Office Taipei

Envoy
- Vincent Chin-Hsiang Yao: Ruth Bradley-Jones

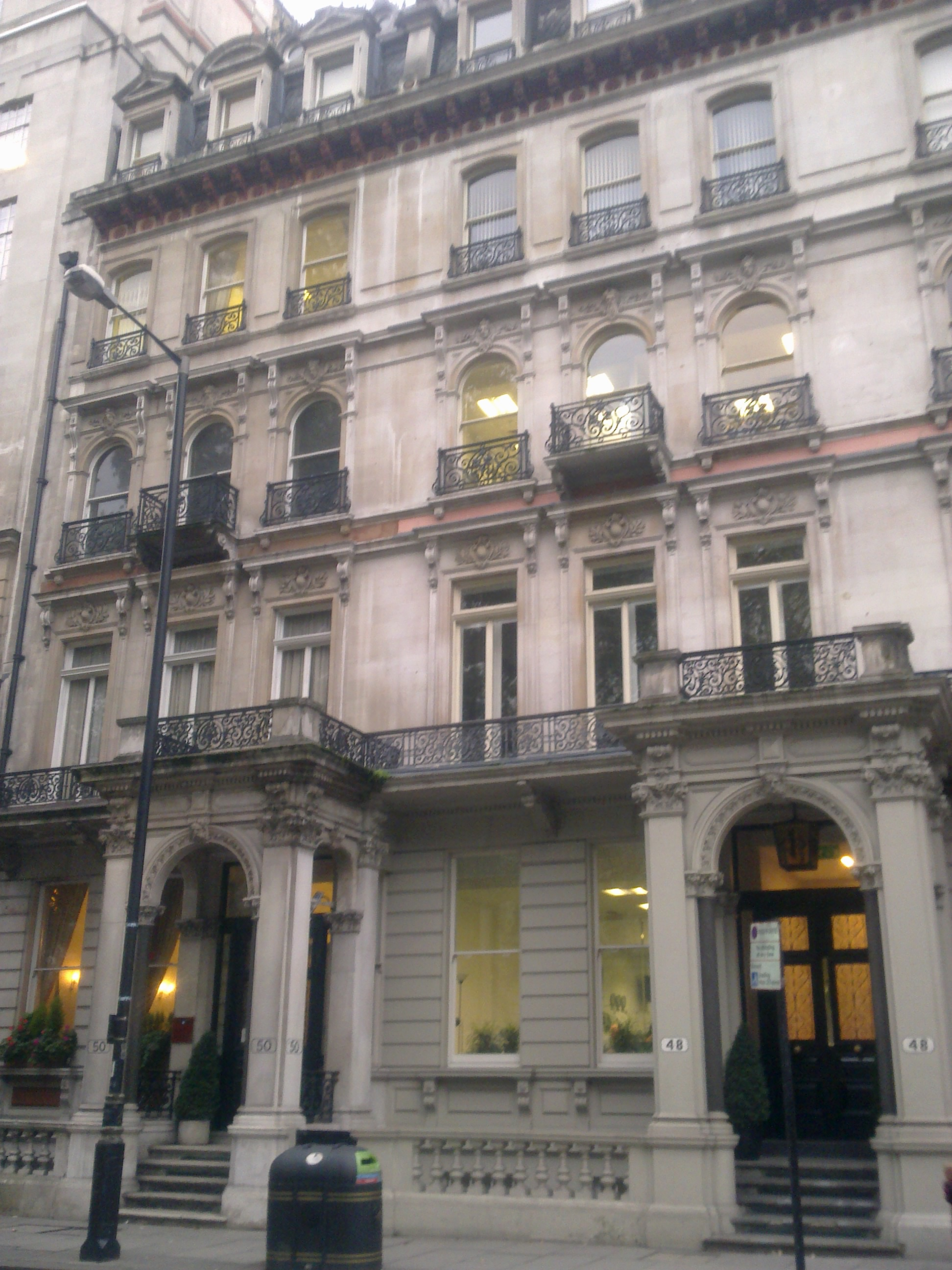
Taipei Representative Office in the U.K.

Taiwan–United Kingdom relations refers to bilateral relations between Taiwan (officially the Republic of China) and the United Kingdom (officially the United Kingdom of Great Britain and Northern Ireland). Due to the One China policy, the United Kingdom's diplomatic recognition of the Government of the Republic of China is currently inactive, and all diplomatic relations between the two countries are conducted on an unofficial basis. Taiwan maintains the Taipei Representative Office in the U.K. in London with a branch office in Edinburgh, while the United Kingdom maintains the British Office in Taipei.

== History ==
=== Kingdom of Tungning (1661–1683) ===
The East India Company and Zheng Jing, ruler of the Kingdom of Tungning had an agreement on trade.

=== Under Qing and Japanese rule ===
In 1861, a British Consulate opened on Fort Santo Domingo in Tamsui. When the Japanese took control of Taiwan in 1895, Taiwan was divided into two halves for consular services. Joseph Henry Longford was appointed Consul at Tainan on 4 February 1896, and then to Nagasaki on 28 December 1896. Dr. Hsieh Pao, appointed on 4 June 1948, was the last ROC ambassador to the UK.

=== Since 1949 ===
After the defeat of the Nationalist forces in mainland China during the Chinese Civil War and the retreat of the Kuomintang government to Taiwan, the United Kingdom broke off diplomatic relations with the Republic of China (ROC) and recognised the People's Republic of China (PRC) from 6 January 1950. The United Kingdom however maintained a Consulate in Tamsui, Taipei County until 13 March 1972.

In September 1962, Taiwan opened its representative office in London under the name of the Free Chinese Centre which was later renamed the Taipei Representative Office in the U.K. The United Kingdom opened its representative office in 1993 under the name of the British Trade and Cultural Office which was later renamed the British Office in 2015.

Both the ROC and the United Kingdom were Permanent members of the UN Security Council until 1971 when the UN switched recognition to the People's Republic of China.

Margaret Thatcher after leaving office visited Taiwan in 1992 and again in 1996.

After the 1999 Jiji earthquake, which was the second-deadliest earthquake in Taiwan's history, the UK dispatched a disaster rescue team to help search for trapped survivors and condolences were offered to the victims by Elizabeth II.

=== Modern relations and exchanges ===
The United Kingdom supports Taiwan's participation in international organisations where statehood is not a prerequisite, including lobbying for Taiwan's participation in the World Health Organization. Taiwan has been referred to as a country by several UK Members of Parliament.

In 2020, Taiwan donated medical masks to the United Kingdom to help fight the COVID-19 pandemic. Donated masks were transferred to the NHS for distribution. The masks were among 7 million donated to European countries.

On 22 October 2020, the Ministry of Foreign Affairs of Taiwan (MOFA) brokered a deal with the UK to get 100 UK students to study at local Taiwanese universities. The students will be on scholarships and they will be learning Mandarin. The deal is part of President Tsai Ing-wen's vision to turn Taiwan into a bilingual country by 2030.

In 2022, a delegation of British parliamentarians led by Alicia Kearns visited Taiwan. The visit prompted protests by the Chinese embassy in London. Former prime minister Liz Truss visited Taiwan in May 2023. In August 2023, the Foreign Affairs Select Committee referred to Taiwan as an "independent country."

In May 2025, former president Tsai Ing-wen visited London as part of her second European tour since leaving office in May 2024. She was received by the British-Taiwanese All-Party Parliamentary Group of the UK Parliament and made a speech calling for more collaboration between the two countries and stressing the importance of maintaining peace and stability in the Taiwan Strait.

== Trade ==
In 2023, bilateral trade between United Kingdom and Taiwan totaled more than $8 billion, with the United Kingdom exporting around $2.47 billion in goods to Taiwan and importing roughly $5.61 billion from Taiwan. Over the last decades the volume of bilateral trade has increased.

UK's primary exports to Taiwan included hard liquor ($653M), gas turbines ($380M), and cars ($206M). Conversely, Taiwan mainly exported broadcasting equipment ($1.04B), integrated circuits ($624M), and office machine parts ($438M) to the UK.
