= Liu Chih-kung =

Taiwanese political scientist and diplomat

- 劉志攻

ROC Representative to the United Kingdom
- In office July 2014 – May 2016
- Preceded by: Shen Lyu-shun
- Succeeded by: David Lee

ROC Representative to Canada
- In office 2012 – June 2014
- Preceded by: David Lee
- Succeeded by: Bruce Linghu

Deputy Secretary-General of National Security Council
- In office 2010–2012
- Secretary-General: Hu Wei-jen

ROC Representative to Czech Republic
- In office 2008–2010

ROC Representative to Mongolia
- In office 2007–2008

Personal details
- Born: Taiwan
- Education: National Chengchi University (BA, MA, PhD)

Liu Chih-kung (Chinese: 劉志攻; pinyin: Liú Zhìgōng) is a Taiwanese political scientist and diplomat.

== Education ==
Liu graduated from National Chengchi University with a bachelor's degree in diplomacy in 1972 and a master's degree in political science in 1975, writing his master's thesis (季辛吉外交理論及實際：世界穩定秩序建立之探討) on American statesman Henry Kissinger. He then earned his Ph.D. in political science from the university in 1983. His doctoral dissertation was titled, "The Republic of China in the United Nations General Assembly" (中華民國在聯合國大會的參與 : 著重分析國際環境變遷對參與行為之影響).

== Career ==
Liu was Taiwanese representative to Mongolia until 2008, when he was moved to the Czech Republic. By May 2010, Liu became the deputy secretary-general of the National Security Council. In 2012, Liu was named representative of the Republic of China to Canada. He was the ROC representative to the United Kingdom from July 2014 to May 2016.

== See also ==
- Ministry of Foreign Affairs (Republic of China)
