= Taipei Representative Office, London =

Diplomatic mission of the Republic of China (Taiwan) in the United Kingdom

Coordinates: 51.49626°N 0.145969°W

Taipei Representative Office in the United Kingdom
- (Taiwan) 駐英國台北代表處
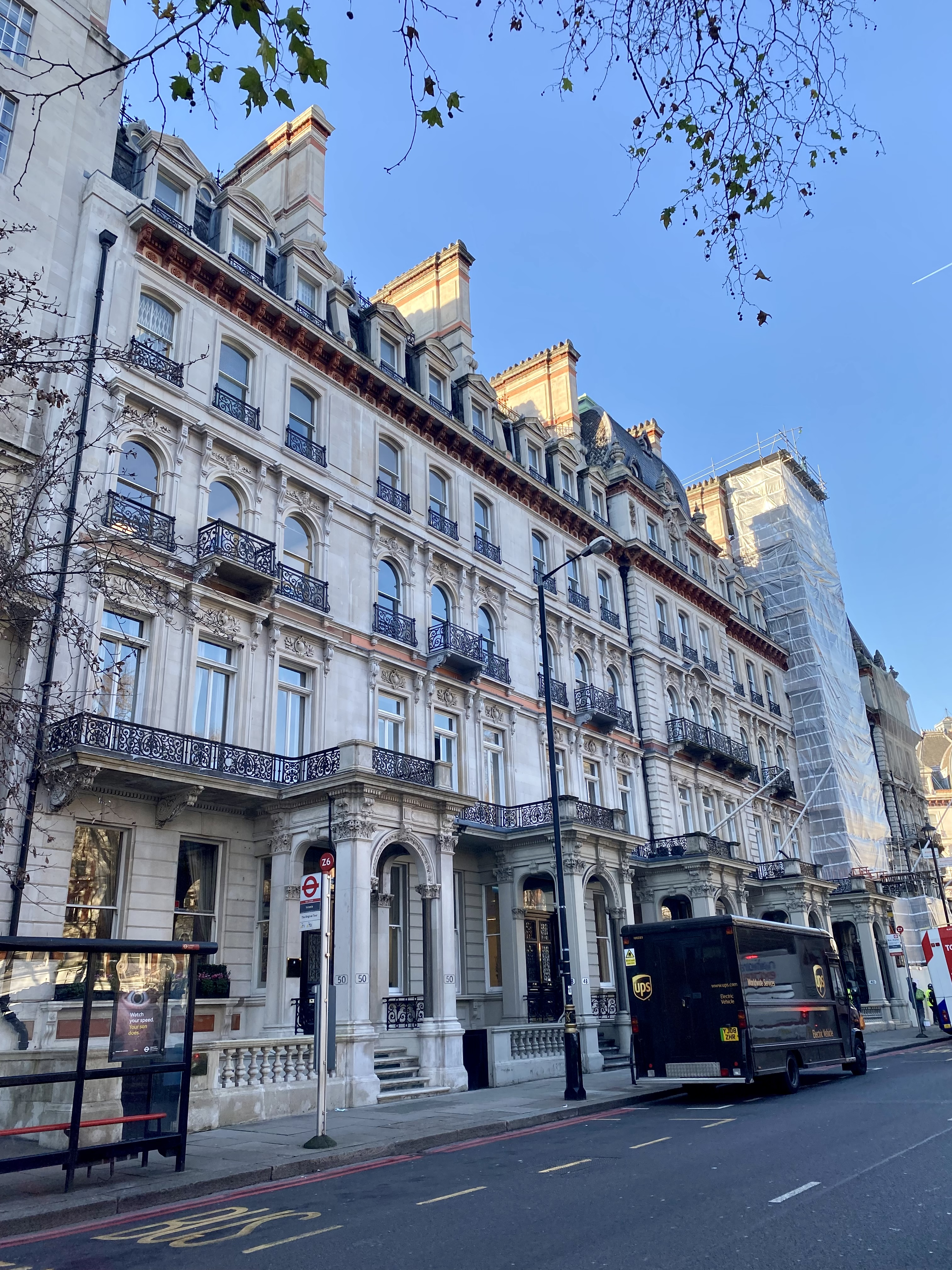

Agency overview
- Jurisdiction: United Kingdom; Seychelles; Sierra Leone
- Headquarters: 46-48 Grosvenor Gardens, London, SW1W 0EB, Victoria, London
- Agency executive: Vincent Yao, Representative
- Parent agency: Ministry of Foreign Affairs
- Website: Taipei Representative Office in the U.K.

The Taipei Representative Office in the United Kingdom (TRO; Chinese: 駐英國台北代表處; pinyin: Zhù Yīngguó Táiběi Dàibiǎo Chù) is a liaison office of Taiwan in the United Kingdom. It is not a fully-fledged diplomatic mission owing to the ongoing Taiwan dispute and the United Kingdom's One-China policy. However, it is the highest-level representation of the Taiwan authority in the United Kingdom. It manages cultural, economic and political cooperation between the UK and Taiwan, as well as offering consular services. Its counterpart body in Taiwan is the British Office Taipei.

== History ==
The Qing dynasty established an embassy to the United Kingdom, which was inherited by Republic of China. After the Chinese Civil War ended in 1949, for a short time the UK continued to recognise the government of Republic of China as the sole legitimate government of China, before switching recognition to the People's Republic of China (PRC) in 1950, while maintaining the British consulate in Tamsui, through which the United Kingdom continued to carry out consular and trade-related activities. Taiwan's office in London was first established in September 1963 as the Free Chinese Centre (自由中國中心). The British consulate was closed after the UK and the PRC upgraded relations to ambassadorial level in March 1972, and in June 1980 the building and land of the consulate in Tamsui were returned to the Taiwanese government. In 1992, the Free Chinese Centre was revised to become the Taipei Representative Office in the United Kingdom.

== Organizational structure ==
- Consular Division
- Culture Division
- Economic Division
- Education Division
- Financial Division
- Overseas Compatriots Division
- Press Division
- Science and Technology Division

== Representatives ==
- Eugene Chien (1993–1997)
- Tzen Wen-hua
- Tien Hung-mao (2002–2004)
- Edgar Lin (2004–2007)
- Katharine Chang (2007–2011)
- Shen Lyu-shun (15 December 2011 to 31 March 2014)
- Liu Chih-kung (July 2014 to 2016)
- David Lin (July 2016 to July 2020)
- Kelly Hsieh (since July 2020)
- Vincent Yao (since January 2024)

== Transportation ==
The nearest station to the representative office is London Victoria station.

== Branch offices ==
- Edinburgh

== Consular districts ==
Representative Office	Consular district
Taipei Representative Office in the United Kingdom	England (excluding County Durham and Cumbria), Northern Ireland, Wales, Guernsey, Jersey; Also serving Seychelles, Sierra Leone, Falkland Islands, British Virgin Islands, Cayman Islands
Taipei Representative Office in the United Kingdom, Edinburgh Office	Northern England (County Durham and Cumbria), Scotland, Isle of Man

== See also ==
- List of diplomatic missions in the United Kingdom
- Taipei Economic and Cultural Representative Office
- List of diplomatic missions of Taiwan
- British Office Taipei
