= List of members of the House of Windsor =

The House of Windsor, the royal house of the United Kingdom and 14 other Commonwealth realms, includes the male-line descendants of Queen Victoria who are subjects of the Crown (1917 Order-in-Council) and the male-line descendants of Queen Elizabeth II (1952 Order-in-Council). According to these two Orders-in-Council, male-line female descendants lose the name Windsor upon marriage.

The line of Prince Arthur, Duke of Connaught and Strathearn, the third son of Victoria, died out in 1974, with the death of Princess Patricia of Connaught, later Lady Patricia Ramsay.

The line of Prince Leopold, Duke of Albany, the youngest son of Victoria, were not considered members of the House of Windsor, as they had fought on the German side during World War I as Dukes of Saxe-Coburg and Gotha (except for the Duke's daughter, Princess Alice, Countess of Athlone, who was considered a member of the House of Windsor as she remained in the United Kingdom). However, Alice's brother, Charles Edward, Duke of Saxe-Coburg and Gotha and his children, remained British dynasts for life, keeping their birth rights to the throne. Until he was deprived of this in 1919, he was also a British prince as a male-line grandson of Queen Victoria.

At the time of the royal family name change in 1917, there were living members of an older branch of British royals from the House of Hanover, descended from Ernest Augustus, King of Hanover, King George III's son and Queen Victoria's paternal uncle. Holding the Dukedom of Cumberland and Teviotdale in the British peerage, as male-line descendants of a sovereign they were not only considered dynasts but also held formally recognised titles and dignities of British princes and princesses.

Three of the current members of the House of Windsor are Catholic (labelled "CA" in the table) and are thus excluded from the line of succession to the British throne. The remaining 49 are in the line of succession, though not consecutively. Two of those 49 were previously excluded from the line of succession due to having married Catholics, but they were restored in 2015 when the Succession to the Crown Act 2013 came into effect.

== House of Windsor: Table of male line descendants of George V ==
Members

- Descendants of George V in male line
- Descendants of Elizabeth II in male line

Generations from George V	Place in the line of succession	Title	Birth (& age)	Image
Descendants of King George VI
3	The Sovereign	The King	14 November 1948 (age 77)	
4	1	The Prince of Wales	21 June 1982 (age 44)	
5	2	Prince George of Wales	22 July 2013 (age 13)	
5	3	Princess Charlotte of Wales	2 May 2015 (age 11)	
5	4	Prince Louis of Wales	23 April 2018 (age 8)	
4	5	The Duke of Sussex	15 September 1984 (age 41)	
5	6	Prince Archie of Sussex	6 May 2019 (age 7)	
5	7	Princess Lilibet of Sussex	4 June 2021 (age 5)	
3	8	Andrew Mountbatten-Windsor	19 February 1960 (age 66)	
4	9	Princess Beatrice, Mrs Edoardo Mapelli Mozzi	8 August 1988 (age 38)	
4	12	Princess Eugenie, Mrs Jack Brooksbank	23 March 1990 (age 36)	
3	16	The Duke of Edinburgh	10 March 1964 (age 62)	
4	17	Earl of Wessex	17 December 2007 (age 18)	
4	18	Lady Louise Mountbatten-Windsor	8 November 2003 (age 22)	
3	19	The Princess Royal (Note: Princess Anne is not 8th in line, as could be expected by her birth order, but 18th. This is a result of the rule of male-preference primogeniture under the law of the Succession to the British throne prior to 2015.)	15 August 1950 (age 76)	
Descendants of Prince Henry, Duke of Gloucester
2	33	The Duke of Gloucester	26 August 1944 (age 82)	
3	34	Earl of Ulster	24 October 1974 (age 51)	
4	35	Lord Culloden	12 March 2007 (age 19)	
4	36	Lady Cosima Windsor	20 May 2010 (age 16)	
3	37	Lady Davina Windsor	19 November 1977 (age 48)	
3	40	Lady Rose Gilman	1 March 1980 (age 46)	
Descendants of Prince George, Duke of Kent
2	43	The Duke of Kent	9 October 1935 (age 90)	
3	44	Earl of St Andrews	26 May 1962 (age 64)	
4	CA	Lord Downpatrick	2 December 1988 (age 37)	
4	CA	Lady Marina Windsor	30 September 1992 (age 33)	
4	45	Lady Amelia Windsor	24 August 1995 (age 31)	
3	CA	Lord Nicholas Windsor	25 July 1970 (age 56)	
4	46	Albert Windsor	22 September 2007 (age 18)	
4	47	Leopold Windsor	8 September 2009 (age 16)	
4	48	Louis Windsor	27 May 2014 (age 12)	
3	49	Lady Helen Taylor	28 April 1964 (age 62)	
2	54	Prince Michael of Kent	4 July 1942 (age 84)	
3	55	Lord Frederick Windsor	6 April 1979 (age 47)	
4	56	Maud Windsor	15 August 2013 (age 13)	
4	57	Isabella Windsor	16 January 2016 (age 10)	
3	58	Lady Gabriella Kingston	23 April 1981 (age 45)	
2	59	Princess Alexandra, The Honourable Lady Ogilvy	25 December 1936 (age 89)	

== See also ==
- British royal family
- British prince
- British princess
- Mountbatten-Windsor
- Descendants of George V
- Windsor, Berkshire
- Windsor Castle
