= Lady Amelia Windsor =

British fashion model and noblewoman

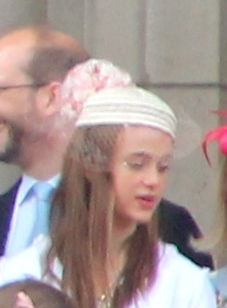
- Lady Amelia at Buckingham Palace in 2012
- Born: Lady Amelia Sophia Theodora Mary Margaret Windsor; 24 August 1995 (age 31); Cambridge, England
- Education: University of Edinburgh
- Occupation: Model
- Partner: Ollie Lewis
- Parents: George Windsor, Earl of St Andrews (father); Sylvana Tomaselli (mother)
- Family: House of Windsor

Lady Amelia Sophia Theodora Mary Margaret Windsor (born 24 August 1995) is a British fashion model and a member of the extended British royal family. As of 2026, she is 45th in the line of succession to the British throne. She is a granddaughter of Prince Edward, Duke of Kent, and therefore a great-great-granddaughter of George V and Queen Mary. She is also a second cousin once removed of King Charles III.

== Early life and family ==
Lady Amelia Sophia Theodora Mary Margaret Windsor was born on 24 August 1995 at the Rosie Hospital in Cambridge. She was christened in December that year at the Chapel Royal, St James's Palace. She is the youngest child of George Windsor, Earl of St Andrews, and his wife, Sylvana Tomaselli. Her paternal grandfather, Prince Edward, Duke of Kent, is a first cousin of Elizabeth II and her father is a second cousin of Charles III. Her paternal great grandparents were Prince George, Duke of Kent, and Princess Marina of Greece and Denmark, a granddaughter of George I of Greece and first cousin of Prince Philip, Duke of Edinburgh. Her paternal great-great grandparents were George V and Mary of Teck. Her paternal grandmother, Katharine, Duchess of Kent, was the daughter of Sir William Worsley, 4th Baronet. Amelia descends maternally from the Austrian Tomaselli family. She is the younger sister of Edward Windsor, Lord Downpatrick, and Lady Marina Windsor. She is a third cousin of William, Prince of Wales, and Prince Harry, Duke of Sussex. In 2013, she was presented to society at le Bal des débutantes.

== Career ==
Amelia is signed with Storm Model Management. In 2016, she was the cover girl for Tatler. In February 2017, she walked the runway for Dolce & Gabbana at Milan Fashion Week. She also walked in Dolce & Gabbana's 2019 Spring collection. She was featured on the August 2017 cover of Vogue Japan. In 2018, Amelia released a collaboration with Penelope Chilvers for a line of shoes, and modelled for the line in a video campaign in Spain. Twenty percent of the proceeds from her shoe collection were donated to War Child, a charity that aids children in conflict areas.

Amelia has worked for Chanel, Azzedine Alaia, and interned at BVLGARI. She is a contributing fashion editor at Tatler.com. In October 2018 Amelia became the spokesmodel for British make-up brand Illamasqua.

In 2020, Amelia began contributing to a new environmental platform called Talia Collective, writing about eco-travel and lifestyle.

== Succession rights ==
Amelia's father, the Earl of St Andrews, lost his succession rights to the British throne according to the Act of Settlement 1701 as a consequence of marrying a Catholic. Although her grandmother, the Duchess of Kent, had converted to Catholicism in 1994, it did not remove her grandfather, Prince Edward, from the line of succession as the duchess was Anglican at the time of their wedding in 1961 and the Act of Settlement 1701 did not take into consideration a person married to someone in the line of succession converting to Catholicism. Her uncle, Lord Nicholas Windsor, converted to Catholicism in 2001, which removed him from the line of succession. In 2013, the Succession to the Crown Act was passed, giving Amelia's father succession rights once again. Amelia's two older siblings were confirmed in the Catholic faith and therefore lost their succession rights. She is therefore the only one among her siblings to maintain a place in the line of succession.

== Personal life ==
After graduating from St Mary's School, Ascot, Amelia spent a gap year in India and Thailand before studying French and Italian at the University of Edinburgh.

Amelia was named in the Vanity Fair International Best Dressed List in 2017. Further stylish looks were photographed in 2017.

In January 2021, she became the patron of Cross River Gorilla Project, an initiative that helps save the critically endangered Cross River gorillas from extinction.

Amelia lives in Notting Hill, West London.

In September 2026, it was reported that she was engaged to property developer Ollie Lewis.

| Preceded by The Earl of St Andrews | Succession to the British throne great-granddaughter of George, Duke of Kent great-great-granddaughter of George V | Followed by Albert Windsor |
