= Lady Marina Macauley =

British noblewoman

- Born: Lady Marina Charlotte Alexandra Katharine Helen Windsor; 30 September 1992 (age 34); Cambridge, England
- Education: St Mary's School Ascot; University of Edinburgh
- Occupation: Philanthropist
- Spouse: Nico Macauley (m. 2026)
- Parents: George Windsor, Earl of St Andrews (father); Sylvana Tomaselli (mother)
- Family: House of Windsor

Lady Marina Charlotte Alexandra Katharine Helen Macauley (née Windsor; born 30 September 1992) is a British philanthropic executive and relative of the British royal family. Although she is a great-great-granddaughter of King George V, and a second cousin once removed of King Charles III, she was removed from the line of succession to the British throne in 2008 after being confirmed into the Roman Catholic Church. She works as a philanthropic executive at The Big Give.

== Early life, family, and education ==
Lady Marina Charlotte Alexandra Katharine Helen Windsor was born on 30 September 1992 at the Rosie Hospital in Cambridge, Cambridgeshire, the second child of George Windsor, Earl of St Andrews, a diplomat and member of the House of Windsor, and Sylvana Tomaselli, a Canadian historian and member of the Austrian-Italian Tomaselli family. Her older brother is Edward Windsor, Lord Downpatrick, and her younger sister is Lady Amelia Windsor. She is a paternal granddaughter of Prince Edward, Duke of Kent, who is a first cousin of Elizabeth II, and Katharine, Duchess of Kent, the only daughter of Sir William Worsley, 4th Baronet. Windsor is named after her great-grandmother Princess Marina of Greece and Denmark.

Windsor was christened on 21 January 1993 in a Church of England ceremony by William Booth, the sub-dean of the Chapel Royal at St James's Palace. Her godparents are Lady Ralph Kerr, Katherine Ruth Panter, William Hanbury-Tenison, and Sasha Poklewski-Koziell.

Windsor attended St Mary's School, Ascot, a Roman Catholic boarding school for girls. She served as deputy head girl at St Mary's. She went on to study French and Portuguese languages at the University of Edinburgh, where she was active in dramatic societies and wrote for the student publication Y-Magazine.

=== Succession rights ===
Until 2008, Windsor was 25th in the line of succession to the British throne. She forfeited her place in the line of succession, under the Act of Settlement 1701, along with her older brother, after being confirmed in the Catholic Church of her mother and paternal grandmother.

== Career ==
In 2010, Windsor modelled for Hardy Amies in Tatler alongside her siblings. She later expressed interest in working in foreign diplomacy and not a modelling career. She has worked on the New Generation festival in Florence. After completing school, she worked for a number of charities including Veterans Aid, Beat Routes Charity, Eco-nnect, and The Big Give, working at the latter as a philanthropic executive.

== Personal life ==
She attended the wedding of her third cousin Prince William, Duke of Cambridge to Catherine Middleton in 2011.

In May 2012, Windsor travelled to Thailand, where she trained in Muay Thai boxing.

She announced her engagement to Nico Macauley, an account executive, on 8 June 2025. Macauley is a great-grandson of William Berry, 1st Viscount Camrose, and a maternal first cousin of the actor Joshua Sasse. The couple were married on 17 June 2026 in a Roman Catholic ceremony at Ampleforth Abbey Church.. They held a further wedding celebration on 20 June at All Saints' Church, Hovingham. For this service, she wore a Larissa Von Planta design and a tiara passed down by Queen Mary to her great-grandmother, Princess Marina.
