= Giuseppe Tomaselli =

Italian actor and singer

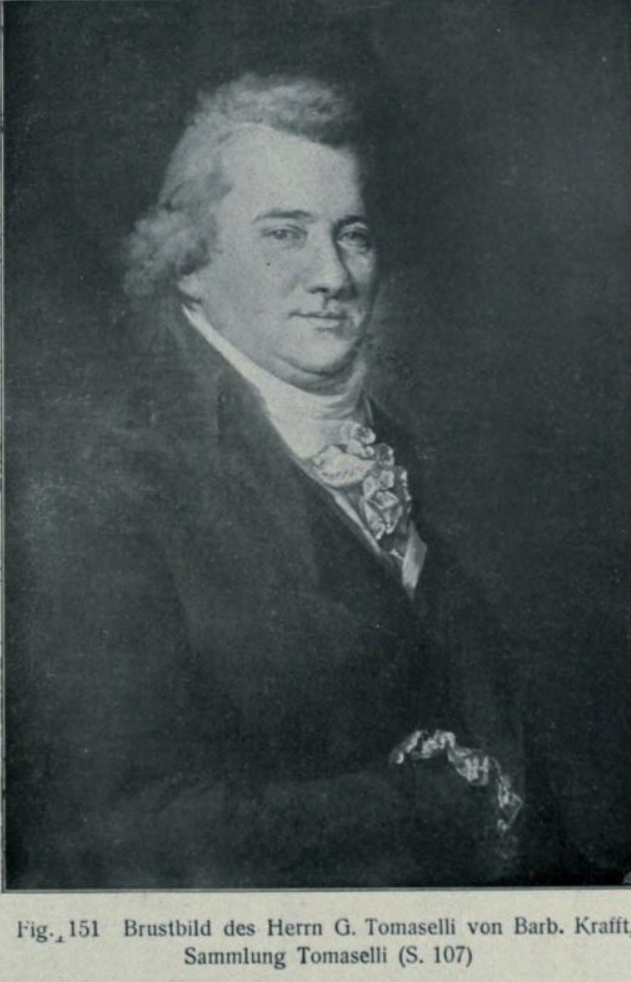
Giuseppe Tomaselli circa 1815

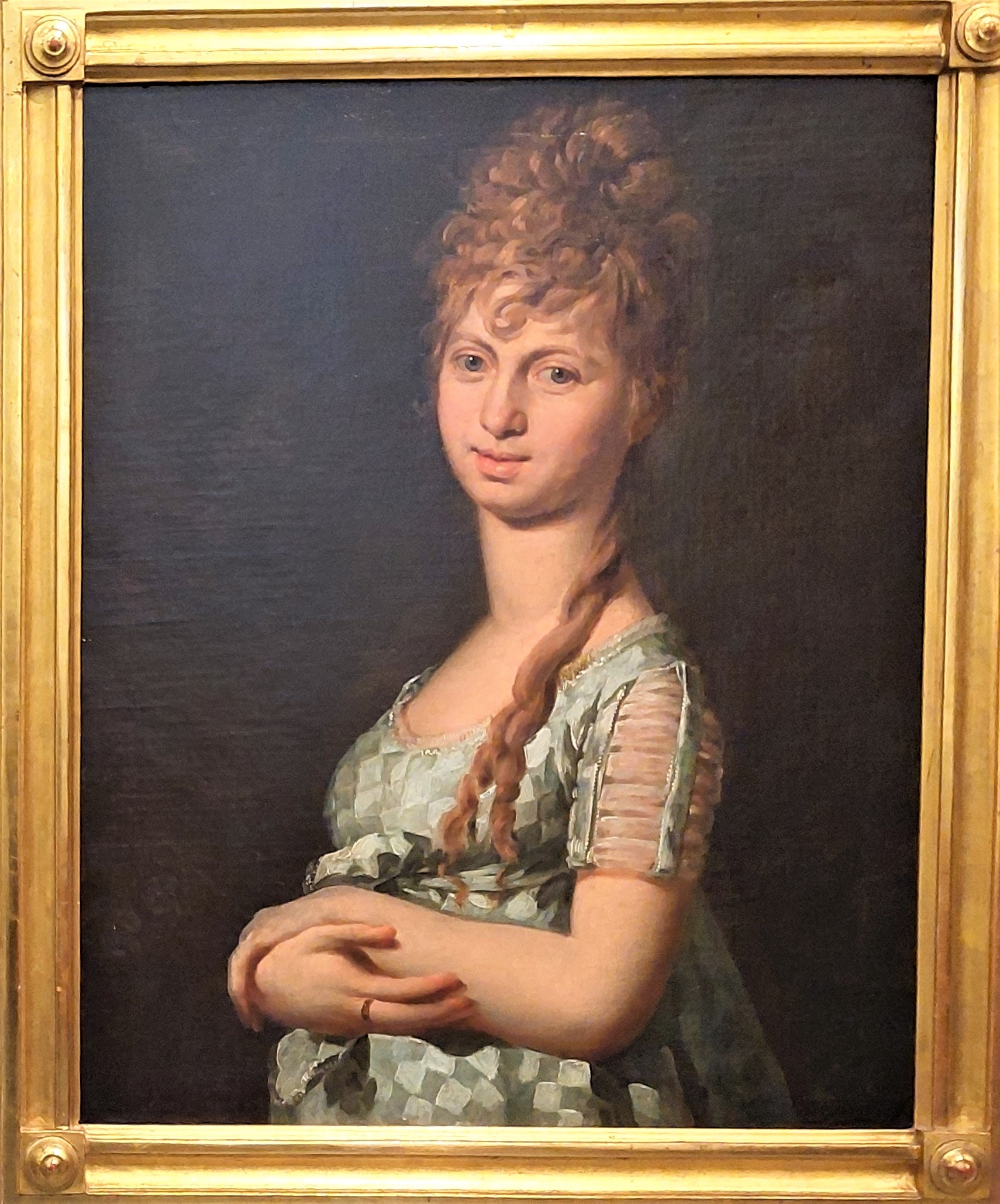
Antonia Tomaselli by Barbara Krafft

Giuseppe Tomaselli (29 January 1758 – 20 March 1836) was an Italian actor and operatic singer (tenor). He is direct ancestor of Sylvana Tomaselli, Countess of St Andrews.

== Life ==
Born in Rovereto, as a member of the prominent Tomaselli family, Giuseppe received a musical education in Milan with a focus on singing. In October 1781, he joined the court chapel of Hieronymus of Colloredo, Prince-Bishop of Salzburg. Soon he became acquainted with Leopold Mozart and his family.

Between 1803 and 1807 he worked as a chamber singer. At the age of 30, Tomaselli married Theresia Gschwendter. After the death of his wife he married Antonia Honikel. With his second wife he had a daughter, Katharina and three sons, Carl, Franz and Ignaz.

Between 1796 and 1798, together with Lorenz Hübner, he directed the Salzburger Landestheater. During this time he not only achieved success as a singer but also as a singing teacher.

After the secularisation of the Salzburg Archbishop's Monastery, the court chapel of the prince archbishop remained in existence for some time. When it was dissolved in February 1806, Tomaselli went to Vienna to the court of Austrian Emperor Francis I. In the autumn of 1833 he retired from private life and left Vienna. For a short time he lived with his family in Salzburg, but then settled in Würzburg. There he died seven weeks after his 78th birthday.

== Interpretations ==
- Armidoro in Piccinni's La buona figliuola, at the Teatro di Cittadella of Bergamo, for the carnaval 1773-1774
- Graf Schönblüh (Il Conte di Belfiore) in Unter zwey Streitenden zieht der dritte den Nutzen (Fra i due litiganti il terzo gode) by Giuseppe Sarti, at the Teatro di Corte of Salisburgo, in 1787.
- Masino in Cimarosa' Giannina e Bernardone, at the Teatro di Corte of Salisburgo, in 1787,
  - and in the same role in the new German version (Hanchen und Bernardon) in 1788

== Bibliography ==
- Gerhard Ammerer: Giuseppe Tomaselli. 1758–1836. Eine biographische Skizze des Salzburger Hoftenors uns Gesangspädagogen aus Anlass seines 250. Geburtstags. In: Mitteilungen der Gesellschaft für Salzburger Landeskunde, volume. 148 (2008), p. 89–104 ISSN 0435-8279
- Ludwig Eisenberg: Großes biographisches Lexikon der deutschen Bühne im 19. Jahrhundert. Paul List, Leipzig, 1903, p. 1045.
