= Sylvana Tomaselli =

Canadian historian and countess (born 1957)

Countess of St Andrews
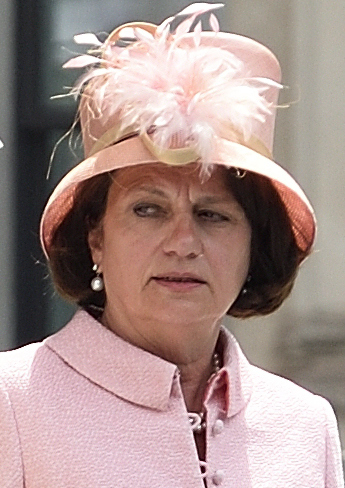
- Countess of St Andrews in 2022
- Born: Sylvana Palma Tomaselli; 28 May 1957 (age 69); Placentia, Newfoundland and Labrador, Canada
- Education: University of British Columbia; York University; Newnham College, Cambridge
- Occupations: Historian; Fellow of St John's College, Cambridge
- Spouses: John Paul Jones (m. 1977; div. 1981); George Windsor, Earl of St Andrews (m. 1988)
- Children: Edward Windsor, Lord Downpatrick; Lady Marina Macauley; Lady Amelia Windsor
- Family: Tomaselli (by birth); Windsor (by marriage)

Sylvana Palma Windsor, Countess of St Andrews (née Tomaselli, previously Jones; born 28 May 1957) is a Canadian-born academic and historian. By virtue of marriage she is a member of the House of Windsor and is related to the British royal family as the wife of George Windsor, Earl of St Andrews, the eldest son of Prince Edward, Duke of Kent, and a second cousin of King Charles III.

She is a devout Roman Catholic. A noted historian and Fellow of St John's College, Cambridge, she is also known professionally as Dr. Sylvana Tomaselli.

== Early life and ancestry ==
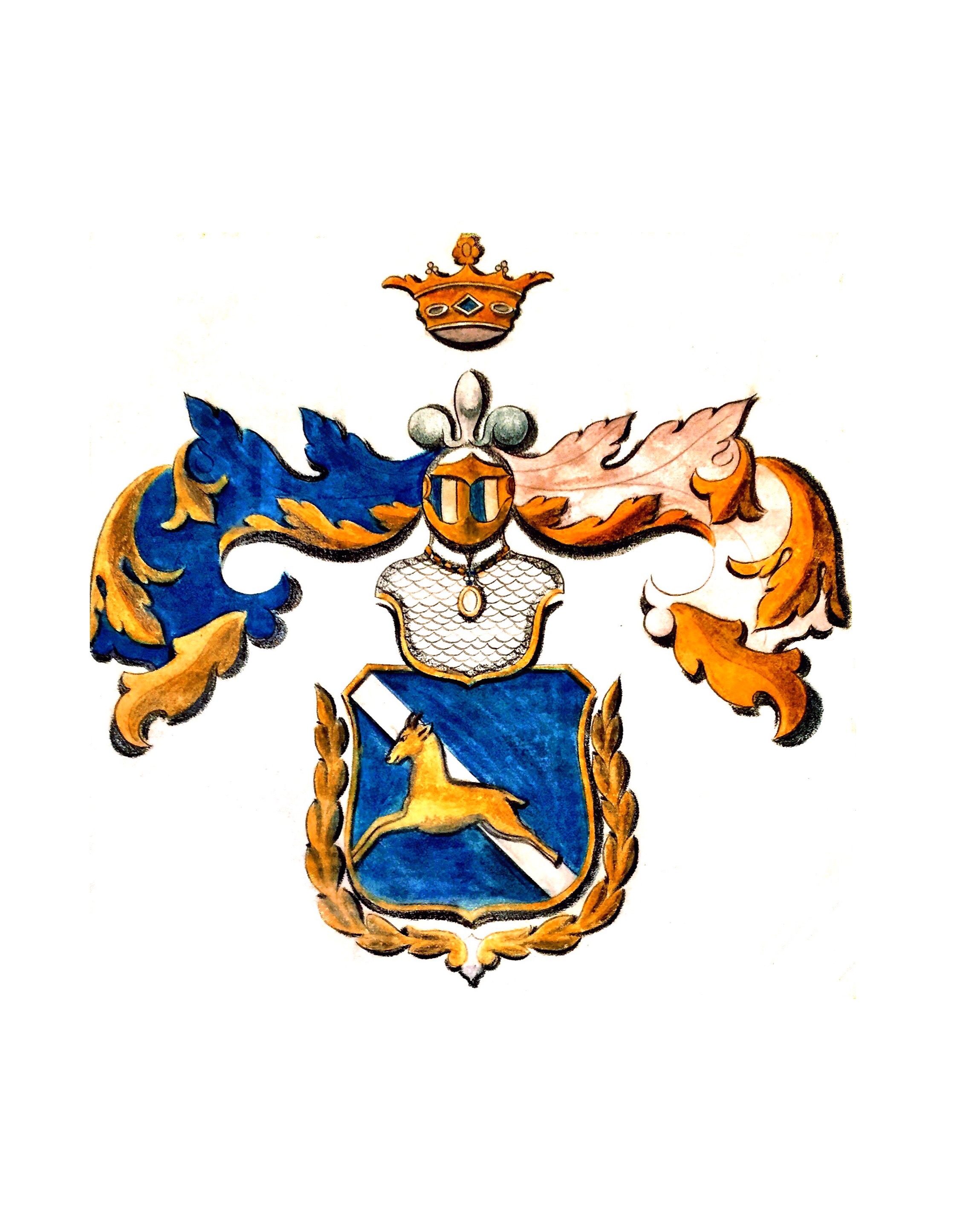
Coat of arms of the Tomaselli family

Tomaselli was born on 28 May 1957 at Placentia, Newfoundland, daughter of Maximilian Karl Tomaselli (formerly of Salzburg) by his wife, Josiane Yvonne née Preschez.

By birth, Sylvana belongs to an Austrian branch of the Tomaselli family, an ancient Italian noble family of condottieri and feudal lords, originally from Piacenza, in northern Italy.

Members of her family later rose to prominent positions in both Kingdom of Italy and the Austrian Empire.

Tomaselli was educated in Canada and England.

== Marriages and family ==
She married firstly, on 25 December 1977 at Vancouver, John Paul Jones, son of Captain Geoffrey Jones of Barbados, but they divorced in 1981 without children.

She married secondly, on 9 January 1988 at Leith in Scotland, George, Earl of St Andrews. The marriage was a civil ceremony rather than one at a church as the bride was a divorcée, and she opted for a royal blue polka-dot velvet suit with matching cossack-style hat as her wedding outfit. She changed into a more bridal look with a calot and a pouf of net veil for the wedding reception. They have three children:

- Edward Edmund Maximilian George Windsor, Lord Downpatrick (born 2 December 1988 at St Mary's Hospital in London)
- Lady Marina Charlotte Alexandra Katharine Helen Macauley (born 30 September 1992 at the Rosie Hospital in Cambridge)
- Lady Amelia Sophia Theodora Mary Margaret Windsor (born 24 August 1995 at the Rosie Hospital in Cambridge)

Lady Saint Andrews' Roman Catholicism no longer precludes her husband's succession to the throne. Two of her children, Edward (2003) and Marina (2008), were received into the Roman Catholic Church, thereby surrendering their places in the line of succession to the thrones of the Commonwealth realms, although Lord and Lady St Andrews' younger daughter, Amelia, is Protestant and is still in remainder to the British Crown.

== Academic career ==
Tomaselli, who received BA (UBC), MA (York, Ontario) and MA and PhD (Cantab) degrees, became a Fellow of St John's College, Cambridge in 2004. She specialises in French and British political theory in the 18th century, especially the history of womanhood, and has written about John Locke, Jean-Jacques Rousseau, David Hume, Mary Wollstonecraft and John Stuart Mill. She is the translator of Book II of the Seminar of Jacques Lacan, The Ego in Freud's Theory and in the Technique of Psychoanalysis. She teaches the three History of Political Theory Papers and is an affiliated Lecturer of the Faculties of History as well as of Social and Political Sciences.

She is a founding member of the European Centre for the Philosophy of Gender, Siegen, Germany, and is currently Director of Studies in History and Social & Political Sciences at St John's College in the University of Cambridge, and a tutor for postgraduates.

Tomaselli was elected a Fellow of the Royal Historical Society in 2015.

== Bibliography ==
- Wollstonecraft: Philosophy, Passion, and Politics (2020) ISBN 978-0691169033

Orders of precedence in the United Kingdom
Preceded by Countess of Ulster	Ladies; Countess of St Andrews	Succeeded by Lady Davina Windsor
