= Tomaselli =

Italian family of condottiero and feudal lords

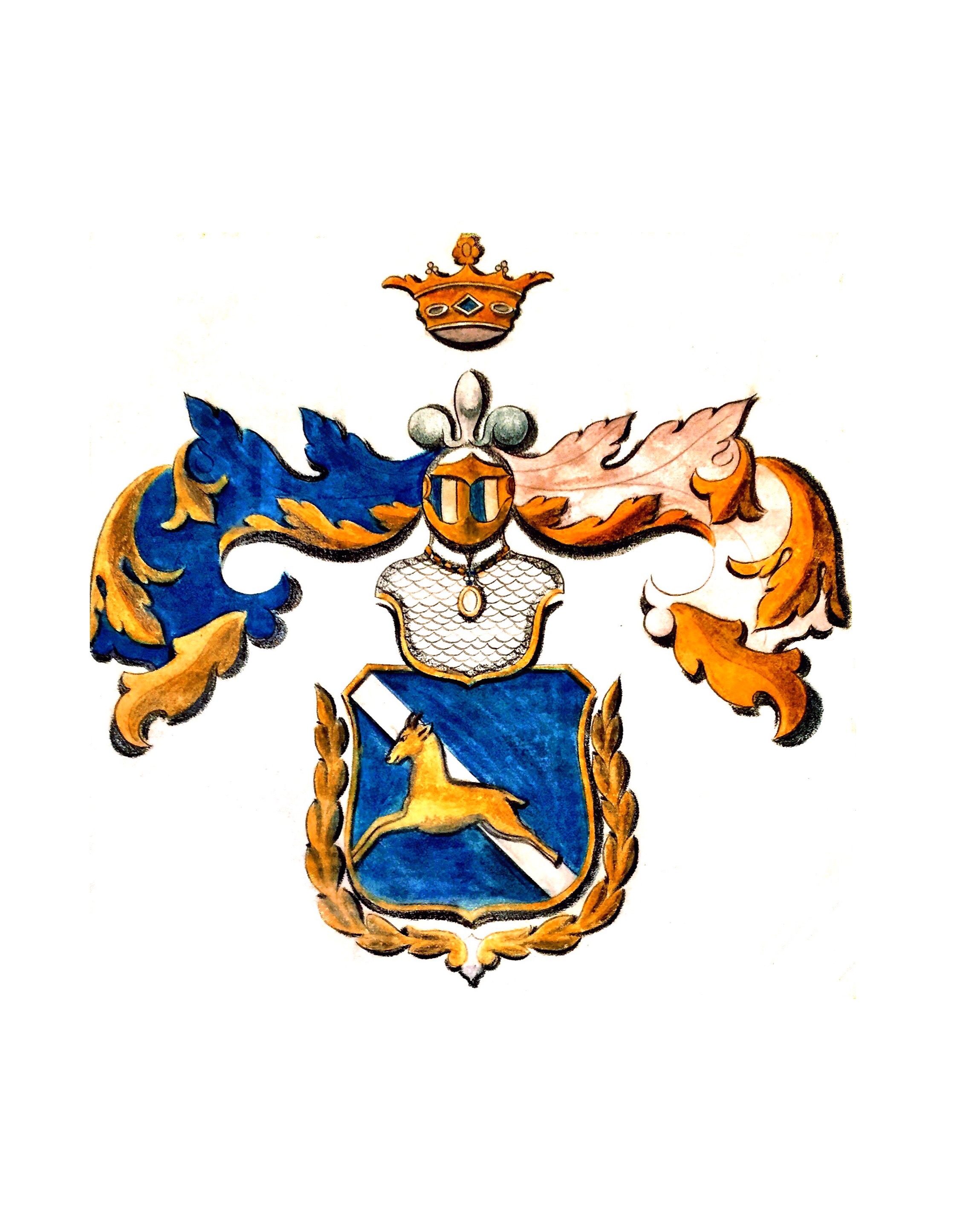
Coat of arms of the Tomaselli family

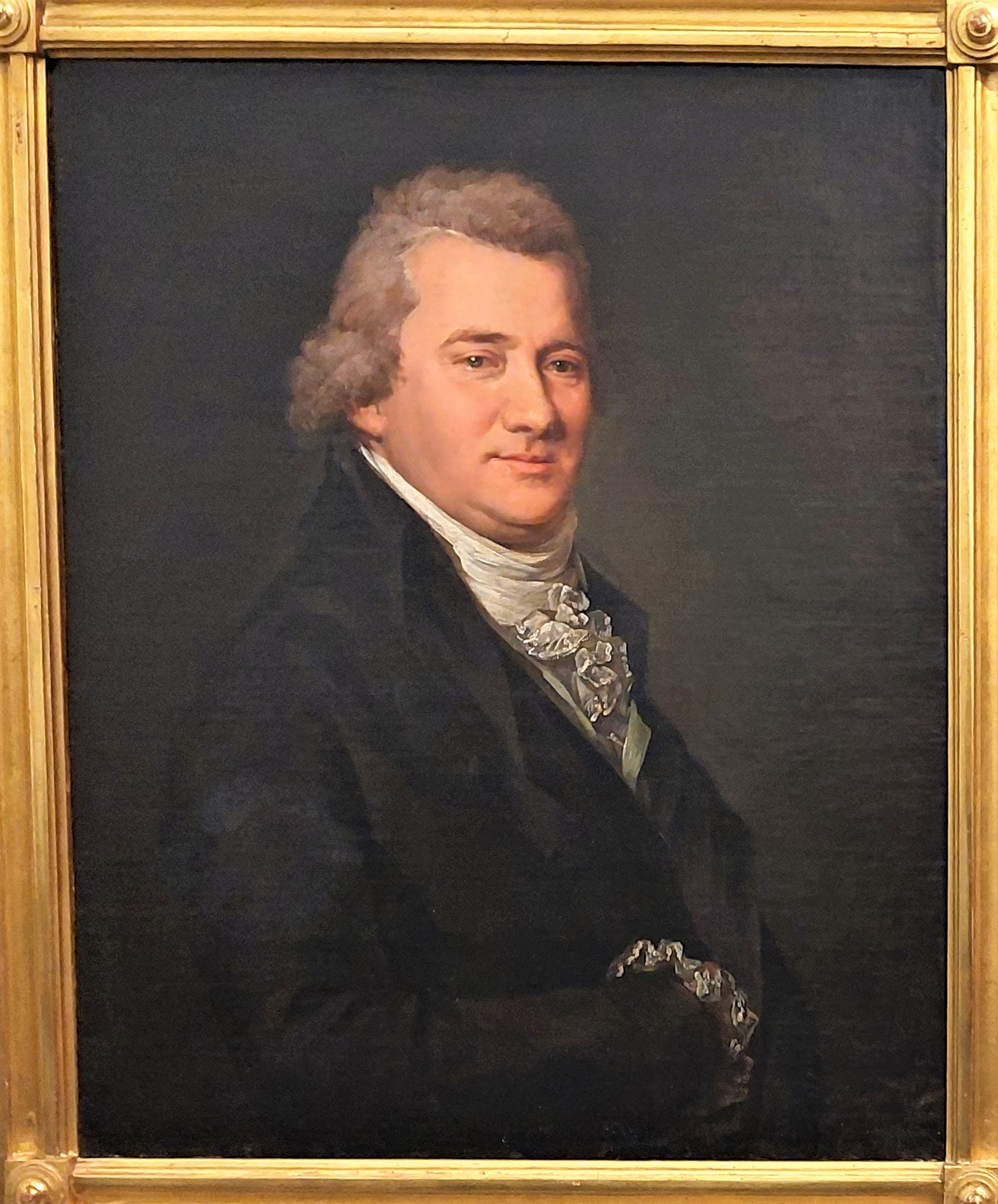
Giuseppe Tomaselli by Barbara Krafft

The Tomaselli family is an old family of condottieri and feudal lords from northern Italy, originally from Piacenza and then settled in Milan, Strigno and in the Province of Bergamo. Over the centuries, members of different branches of the family have been awarded knighthoods in various orders of chivalry. It is believed that Pope Boniface IX was a scion of this family. A branch of the family that settled in Austria still exists and produced many noted artists during the late 18th and 19th centuries.

== History ==
The first document of the family dates back to the beginning of the 12th century. The founder of the family, Luigi Tomaselli, was decorated with the title of Knight in 1113 by the Margravine Matilda of Tuscany after having distinguished himself in the battles against Henry IV, Holy Roman Emperor, who was an enemy of Pope Gregory VII, in 1092. Cosimo Tomaselli, Luigi's nephew, fought with the Lombard League against Frederick Barbarossa in Legnano. Economic fortune came immediately thanks to the wool trade and the entry into local politics of the family. They moved to the fiefdoms of some territories and finally to the Archdiocese of Milan, where they stayed for centuries. Giacomo Tomaselli, a noted lawyer closely linked to the ruling House of Sforza, was appointed Grand Chancellor of the Duchy of Milan in 1537.

In the late seventeenth century, the Tomaselli family were sent by the Republic of Venice to the Province of Bergamo, under the rule of Doge Silvestro Valier, to control the Venetian possessions that surrounded the river Serio. They settled permanently in the Bergamo area, near the areas of the Serio river where they controlled, through their fiefs, the southwestern borders of the Venetian republic.

In the mid-eighteenth century, the most important branch of the Tomaselli family, that of the Counts of Sottocasa, became extinct, which put an end to the prominence of the entire family.

== Title of Count ==
Luigi Sergio Tomaselli, already blazoned and enrolled in the nobility of Bergamo, was awarded the hereditary title of Conte di Sottocasa by Francis II, Holy Roman Emperor in 1801,; it is inherited by the principle of primogeniture.

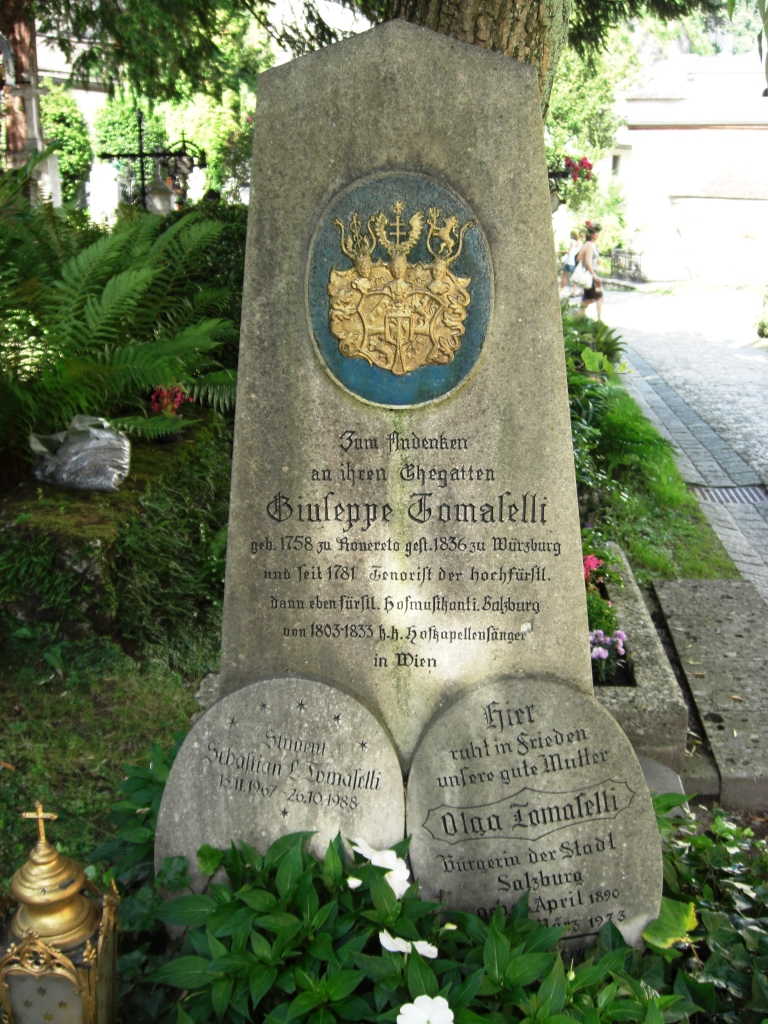
Tomb of Giuseppe with his coat of arms

== Austrian branch ==
It is descended from Giuseppe Tomaselli (1758–1836), who was born in Rovereto in the Prince-Bishopric of Trent, which later in his lifetime belonged to Austria and which is now in Italy. After studying music in Milan, he immigrated to Salzburg in 1781 to become a noted singer in the court chapel of Hieronymus, Count of Colloredo-Wallsee, Prince-Bishop of Salzburg.

Afterwards, he became a music teacher in Salzburg and in Vienna. Giuseppe (Joseph) Tomaselli was married to his German wife, Antonia Honikel (1775–1846), a native of Landersdorf near Thalmässing in the Electorate of Bavaria, at that time part of the Holy Roman Empire.

They were the parents of Franz Tomaselli (1801–1846), who was a noted actor and comedian in Vienna; of Karl Tomaselli (1809–1887), who founded a famous coffee shop in Salzburg which still exists; of Ignaz Tomaselli (1812–1862), who was a prominent comedian and singer; and of Katharina Tomaselli (1811–1857), who was an opera singer and the mother of an Austrian actress, who later became theatre director, Josefine Gallmeyer (1838–1884).

One prominent member of this branch of the family is historian Sylvana Tomaselli, the wife of George Windsor, Earl of St Andrews, and daughter-in-law of Prince Edward, Duke of Kent. Her father Maximilian Karl Tomaselli, who was born in Salzburg, and her French mother Josiane Yvonne Preschez settled in Newfoundland, Canada, where she was born.

== Notable members ==
- Pope Boniface IX, Pope
- Giuseppe Tomaselli, noted opera singer
- Sylvana Tomaselli, Countess of St Andrews, by marriage a member of the House of Windsor
- Pancho Tomaselli, Bass Player
