= George Windsor, Earl of St Andrews =

Elder son of Prince Edward, Duke of Kent

Earl of St Andrews
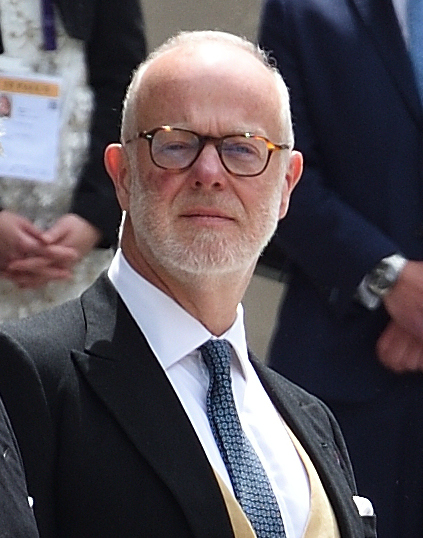
- Windsor in 2022
- Born: George Philip Nicholas Windsor; 26 June 1962 (age 64); Iver, Buckinghamshire, England
- Education: Downing College, Cambridge
- Occupation: Philanthropist
- Spouse: Sylvana Tomaselli (m. 1988)
- Children: Edward Windsor, Lord Downpatrick; Lady Marina Macauley; Lady Amelia Windsor
- Parents: Prince Edward, Duke of Kent (father); Katharine Worsley (mother)
- Family: House of Windsor

George Philip Nicholas Windsor, Earl of St Andrews (born 26 June 1962), is a British philanthropist, former diplomat and a member of the extended British royal family. He was a member of the Diplomatic Service in New York and Budapest. St Andrews became chancellor of the University of Bolton in 2017. He is the trustee of the Next Century Foundation and patron of the Welsh Sinfonia. He is the elder son of Prince Edward, Duke of Kent, and Katharine, Duchess of Kent, and heir apparent to the dukedom of Kent. He is the second cousin of King Charles III and 44th in the line of succession to the British throne as of 2026.

== Early life and education ==
George Philip Nicholas Windsor was born on 26 June 1962 at Coppins, Iver, Buckinghamshire, the eldest child of Prince Edward, Duke of Kent, and Katharine, Duchess of Kent (née Worsley, a daughter of Sir William Worsley, 4th Baronet). Royal obstetrician Sir John Peel assisted at his birth, at which time Lord St Andrews was 10th in line of succession to the throne.

He was christened in the music room at Buckingham Palace on 14 September by the Archbishop of Canterbury Michael Ramsey. His godparents were Prince Philip, Duke of Edinburgh; his aunt Princess Alexandra of Kent, his uncle Oliver Worsley, and Lady Lily Serena Lumley (daughter of the 11th Earl of Scarbrough).

He was educated at Eton College. He then studied history at Downing College, Cambridge, where he earned an Bachelor of Arts (BA) degree; as per tradition, his BA was promoted to a Master of Arts (MA Cantab) degree.

== Career ==
Lord St Andrews served in the Diplomatic Service in New York and Budapest. He later worked in the antiquarian book business for Christie's auction house. He has been a trustee of the SOS Children's Villages UK charity, as also a patron of Clifton Scientific Trust, an educational charity giving young people experience of the world of science and engineering. He is the longserving patron of the Association for International Cancer Research.

In April 2012, he also became a trustee of the Next Century Foundation, a charity working throughout the Middle East. Furthermore, he is a trustee of the Global eHealth Foundation and Patron of the Welsh Sinfonia. On 30 March 2017, he was installed as chancellor of the University of Bolton.

== Personal life ==
As the first member of the royal family born without a title since George V's creation of the House of Windsor in 1917, Lord St Andrews was the first descendant of George V to need Windsor as a surname. While not an earl himself, he uses the courtesy title of Earl of St Andrews, a subsidiary title held by his father, Prince Edward, Duke of Kent which he may use as his oldest son.

On 9 January 1988, Lord St Andrews married Sylvana Tomaselli, a Canadian-born academic, at Leith Registration Office in Edinburgh at a civil ceremony. The couple has three children:

- Edward Windsor, Lord Downpatrick (born 1988)
- Lady Marina Windsor (born 1992), married Nico Macauley 20 June 2026.
- Lady Amelia Windsor (born 1995)

He is a Freemason. In 2024, he was installed as master of Royal Alpha Lodge 16. He was appointed Senior Grand Warden of the United Grand Lodge of England in April 2024.

George Windsor, Earl of St Andrews Born: 26 June 1962
Academic offices
Preceded by Sir Ernest Ryder	Chancellor of the University of Bolton; 2017–present	Incumbent
Lines of succession
Preceded by The Duke of Kent	Succession to the British throne grandson of George, Duke of Kent great-grandson of George V	Followed by Lady Amelia Windsor
