= Succession to the British throne =

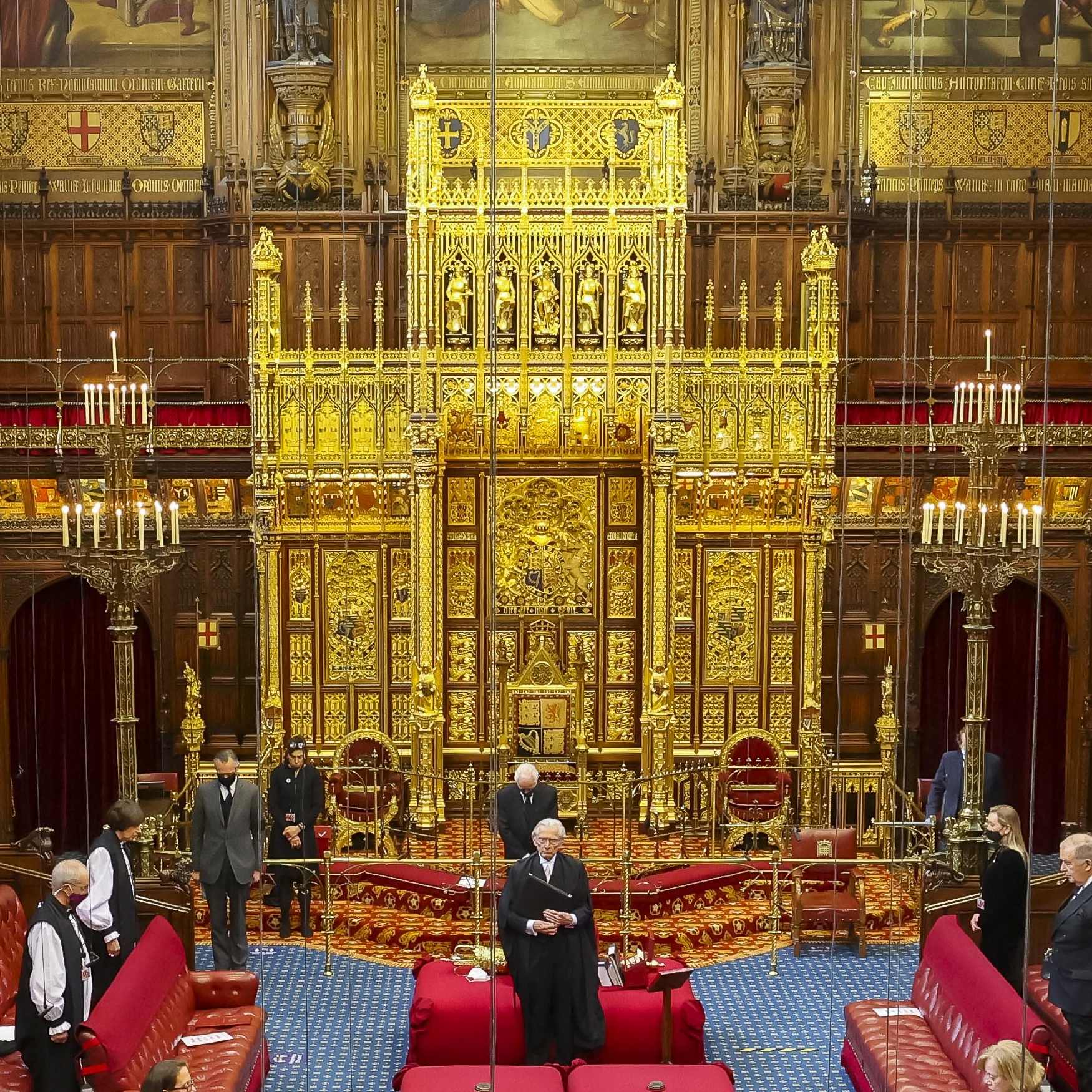
The Sovereign's Throne in the House of Lords, from which the speech is delivered at the State Opening of Parliament

Succession to the British throne is determined by descent, sex, (Note: Males born on or before 28 October 2011 precede their elder sisters in the line of succession.) legitimacy, and religion. Under common law, the Crown is inherited by a sovereign's children or by a childless sovereign's nearest collateral line. The Bill of Rights 1689 and the Act of Settlement 1701 restrict succession to the throne to the legitimate Protestant descendants of Sophia of Hanover who are in "communion with the Church of England". Spouses of Catholics were disqualified from 1689 until the law was amended in 2015. Protestant descendants of those excluded for being Roman Catholics are eligible.

King Charles III has been the sovereign since 2022, and his heir apparent is his elder son, William, Prince of Wales. William's three children are next, in order of birth: Prince George, Princess Charlotte, and Prince Louis. Fifth in line is Prince Harry, Duke of Sussex, the younger son of the King; sixth is Harry's elder child, Prince Archie. Under the Perth Agreement, which came into effect in 2015, only the first six in line of succession require the sovereign's consent before they marry; without such consent, they and their children would be disqualified from succession.

The United Kingdom is one of the Commonwealth realms, which are sovereign states that share the same person as monarch and the same order of succession. In 2011, the prime ministers of the then-16 realms agreed unanimously to amend the rules of succession. Male-preference (cognatic) primogeniture was abandoned, meaning that males born after 28 October 2011 no longer precede females (elder sisters) in line, and the ban on marriages to Catholics was lifted, though the monarch still needs to be in communion with the Church of England. After the necessary legislation had been enacted in accordance with each realm's constitution, the changes took effect on 26 March 2015.

== Current line of succession ==
No official, complete version of the line of succession is maintained. The exact number, in more remote collateral lines, of the people who would be eligible is uncertain. In 2001, American genealogist William Addams Reitwiesner compiled a list of 4,973 living descendants of Electress Sophia of Hanover, in order of succession without omitting Roman Catholics. When updated in January 2011, the list included 5,753. The final person in both lists, number 4,973 and 5,753, was Karin Vogel (born 1973), a therapist from Rostock, Germany.

As of 2026, the UK government is considering legislation to remove Andrew Mountbatten-Windsor from the line of succession, which would require the consent of all Commonwealth realms. Formerly known as "Prince Andrew, Duke of York," the King's brother has been publicly disgraced and stripped of all titles due to his relationship with Jeffrey Epstein and accusations of sexual abuse. The governments of Canada, Australia, and New Zealand have stated that they would support such a measure.

The annotated list below covers the first part of this line of succession, being limited to descendants of the sons of King George V, King Charles III's great-grandfather. People named in italics are unnumbered either because they are deceased or because sources report them to be excluded from the succession. (Note: Some deceased people without descendants are not listed, for example Prince John of the United Kingdom and Prince William of Gloucester.)

Notes and sources
Mark	Source for listing or note on exclusion from succession
	Current monarch
	Previous monarch
B	Official website of the British monarchy
D	Debrett's website (as of 29 January 2025): "The Line of Succession"
W	Whitaker's Almanack 2021
M	These people had been excluded through marriage to a Roman Catholic. This exclusion was repealed on 26 March 2015, restoring them to the line of succession, when the Perth Agreement came into effect.
X	Excluded as Roman Catholics. This exclusion is not affected by changes subsequent to the Perth Agreement.

- King George V (1865–1936)
  - King Edward VIII (1894–1972)
  - King George VI (1895–1952)
    - Queen Elizabeth II (1926–2022)
      - King Charles III (born 1948)
        - (1) William, Prince of Wales (born 1982) ^{B D W}
          - (2) Prince George of Wales (born 2013) ^{B D W}
          - (3) Princess Charlotte of Wales (born 2015) ^{B D W}
          - (4) Prince Louis of Wales (born 2018) ^{B D W}
        - (5) Prince Harry, Duke of Sussex (born 1984) ^{B D W}
          - (6) Prince Archie of Sussex (born 2019) ^{B D W}
          - (7) Princess Lilibet of Sussex (born 2021) ^{B D}
      - (8) Andrew Mountbatten-Windsor (born 1960) ^{B D W}
        - (9) Princess Beatrice (born 1988) ^{B D W}
          - (10) Sienna Mapelli Mozzi (born 2021) ^{B D}
          - (11) Athena Mapelli Mozzi (born 2025) ^{B D}
        - (12) Princess Eugenie (born 1990) ^{B D W}
          - (13) August Brooksbank (born 2021) ^{B D}
          - (14) Ernest Brooksbank (born 2023) ^{B D}
          - (15) Adelaide Brooksbank (born 2026) ^{B}
      - (16) Prince Edward, Duke of Edinburgh (born 1964) ^{B D W}
        - (17) James, Earl of Wessex (born 2007) ^{B D W}
        - (18) Lady Louise Windsor (born 2003) ^{B D W}
      - (19) Anne, Princess Royal (born 1950) ^{B D W}
        - (20) Peter Phillips (born 1977) ^{B D W}
          - (21) Savannah Phillips (born 2010) ^{B D W}
          - (22) Isla Phillips (born 2012) ^{B D W}
        - (23) Zara Tindall (née Phillips; born 1981) ^{B D W}
          - (24) Mia Tindall (born 2014) ^{B D W}
          - (25) Lena Tindall (born 2018) ^{B D W}
          - (26) Lucas Tindall (born 2021) ^{B D}
    - Princess Margaret, Countess of Snowdon (1930–2002)
      - (27) David Armstrong-Jones, 2nd Earl of Snowdon (born 1961) ^{D W}
        - (28) Charles Armstrong-Jones, Viscount Linley (born 1999) ^{D W}
        - (29) Lady Margarita Armstrong-Jones (born 2002) ^{D W}
      - (30) Lady Sarah Chatto (née Armstrong-Jones; born 1964) ^{D W}
        - (31) Samuel Chatto (born 1996) ^{D W}
        - (32) Arthur Chatto (born 1999) ^{D W}
  - Prince Henry, Duke of Gloucester (1900–1974)
    - (33) Prince Richard, Duke of Gloucester (born 1944) ^{D W}
      - (34) Alexander Windsor, Earl of Ulster (born 1974) ^{D W}
        - (35) Xan Windsor, Lord Culloden (born 2007) ^{D W}
        - (36) Lady Cosima Windsor (born 2010) ^{D W}
      - (37) Lady Davina Windsor (born 1977) ^{D W}
        - (38) Senna Lewis (born 2010) ^{D W}
        - (39) Tāne Lewis (born 2012) ^{D W}
      - (40) Lady Rose Gilman (née Windsor; born 1980) ^{D W}
        - (41) Lyla Gilman (born 2010) ^{D W}
        - (42) Rufus Gilman (born 2012) ^{D W}
  - Prince George, Duke of Kent (1902–1942)
    - (43) Prince Edward, Duke of Kent (born 1935) ^{D W}
      - (44) George Windsor, Earl of St Andrews (born 1962) ^{M D W}
        - Edward Windsor, Lord Downpatrick (born 1988) ^{X D W}
        - Lady Marina Macauley (née Windsor; born 1992) ^{X D W}
        - (45) Lady Amelia Windsor (born 1995) ^{D W}
      - Lord Nicholas Windsor (born 1970) ^{X D W}
        - (46) Albert Windsor (born 2007) ^{X? D W} (Note: Albert and Leopold Windsor were listed on the official website of the British monarchy until 2015 and in the 2013 edition of Whitaker's Almanack as following Estella Taylor (born 2004) and eligible to succeed; MSN News, and Whitaker's Almanack 2015 and 2021 list them after Lady Amelia Windsor and before Lady Helen Taylor. They were baptised as Catholics, and are not listed in line in editions of Whitaker's earlier than 2012. Debrett's says their place in the line of succession will be re-assessed when they reach the age of majority.)
        - (47) Leopold Windsor (born 2009) ^{X? D W}
        - (48) Louis Windsor (born 2014) ^{X? D W}
      - (49) Lady Helen Taylor (née Windsor; born 1964) ^{D W}
        - (50) Columbus Taylor (born 1994) ^{D W}
        - (51) Cassius Taylor (born 1996) ^{D W}
        - (52) Eloise Taylor (born 2003) ^{D W}
        - (53) Estella Taylor (born 2004) ^{D W}
    - (54) Prince Michael of Kent (born 1942) ^{M D W}
      - (55) Lord Frederick Windsor (born 1979) ^{D W}
        - (56) Maud Windsor (born 2013) ^{D W}
        - (57) Isabella Windsor (born 2016) ^{D W}
      - (58) Lady Gabriella Kingston (née Windsor; born 1981) ^{D W}
    - (59) Princess Alexandra, The Honourable Lady Ogilvy (born 1936) ^{D W}
      - (60) James Ogilvy (born 1964) ^{D W}
        - (61) Alexander Ogilvy (born 1996) ^{D W}
        - (62) Flora Vesterberg (née Ogilvy; born 1994) ^{D W}
          - (63) Isabel Vesterberg (born 2026)
      - (64) Marina Ogilvy (born 1966) ^{D W}
        - (65) Christian Mowatt (born 1993) ^{D W}
        - (66) Zenouska Mowatt (born 1990) ^{D W}

== History ==
=== England ===
The line of succession was governed by the common law rule of primogeniture until the fourteenth century, when Parliament first began to legislate on the subject. However, this was not invariably followed. The sons of William the Conqueror contested each other for the throne, and his granddaughter Matilda was passed over for his grandson King Stephen, even though Matilda's father had been king, and Stephen's claim was only that his mother had been William's daughter. After the death of Richard I in 1199, the throne should have gone to his nephew Arthur, the son of his next brother Geoffrey, but as Arthur was still only a child, Richard's youngest brother John was able to take the throne for himself, under the pretext that he was a closer relative to the late king than Arthur, who was one generation removed. John bolstered his claim to the throne by having his nephew secretly killed.

When Richard II was deposed in 1399 by Henry IV, Henry also usurped another relative with a better claim, Edmund, Earl of March. Richard and Henry were the grandsons of Edward III by, respectively, Edward's first and fourth sons; Edmund was descended from Edward's third son, and so was placed ahead of Henry in the line of succession. However, as Edmund was only seven at the time, and Henry's position would not have been secure with any lesser title than king, Henry took the throne for himself, with the endorsement of Parliament. Decades later, the rival House of York, which was descended from Edmund's sister Anne de Mortimer, seized the throne from Henry's grandson during the Wars of the Roses.

In 1485, Henry Tudor, a female-line descendant of a legitimated branch of the royal house of Lancaster, the House of Beaufort, assumed the English crown as Henry VII, after defeating and killing Richard III in battle. Richard had been the last king of the House of York, and the last of the Plantagenet dynasty. Henry declared himself king retroactively from 21 August 1485, the day before his victory over Richard at Bosworth Field. Sir William Blackstone called Henry's hereditary claim "the most remote and unaccountable that was ever set up," and said that his subsequent marriage to Richard's niece Elizabeth of York, the daughter of Edward IV, was "his best title to the crown." Henry caused Richard's Titulus Regius (Parliament's recognition of his own claim) to be repealed and expunged from the Rolls of Parliament. After Henry's coronation in London in October that year, his first parliament, summoned to meet at Westminster in November, enacted that "the inheritance of the crown should be, rest, remain and abide in the most royal person of the then sovereign lord, King Henry VII, and the heirs of his body lawfully coming."

Henry VII was followed by his son, Henry VIII. Though his father descended from the Lancastrians, Henry VIII could also claim the throne through the Yorkist line, as his mother Elizabeth was the daughter of Edward IV. In 1542, Henry also assumed the title King of Ireland; this would pass down with the monarchs of England, and later Great Britain, until the separate crowns merged in 1800.

Henry VIII's multiple marriages led to several complications over succession. Henry VIII was first married to Catherine of Aragon, by whom he had a daughter named Mary. His second marriage, to Anne Boleyn, resulted in a daughter named Elizabeth. Henry VIII had a son, Edward, by his third wife, Jane Seymour. The Succession to the Crown Act 1533 declared Mary illegitimate; the Second Act in 1536, did the same for Elizabeth. The Third Act in 1543 did not legitimize the daughters, but did reinsert them into the line of succession after Edward, providing further "that the King should and might give, will, limit, assign, appoint or dispose the said imperial Crown and the other premises [...] by letters patent or last will in writing." Mary and Elizabeth, under Henry VIII's will, were to be followed by the granddaughters of the King's deceased sister Mary. Still excluded were Mary's still-living daughters, Frances Grey, Duchess of Suffolk and Eleanor Clifford, Countess of Cumberland. This will also excluded from the succession the descendants of Henry's sister Margaret, who were the rulers of Scotland.

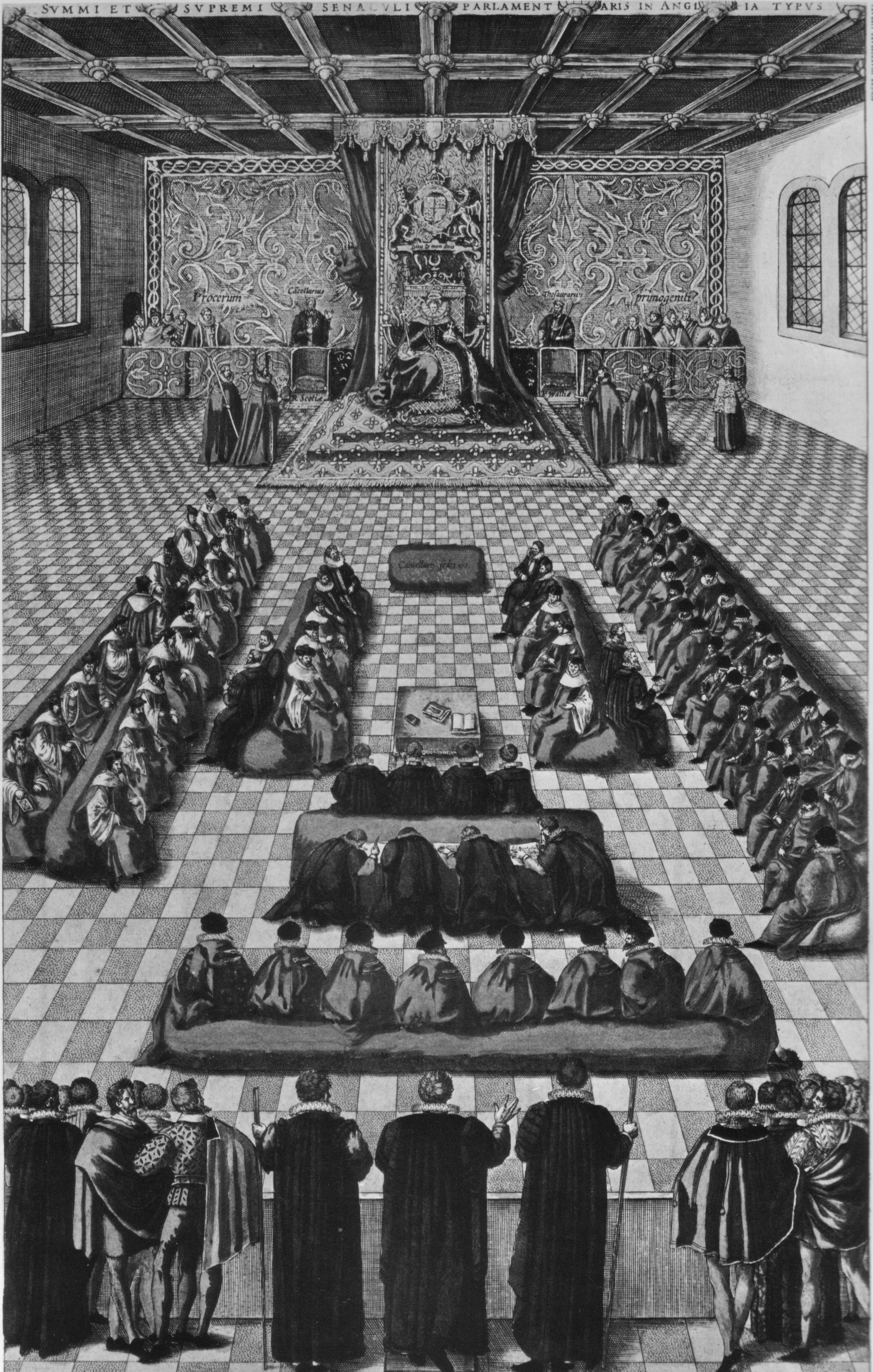
Queen Elizabeth I enthroned in Parliament

Edward VI succeeded Henry VIII in 1547. Edward VI attempted to divert the course of succession in his will to prevent his Catholic half-sister, Mary, from inheriting the throne. He excluded both Mary and Elizabeth, settling on the Duchess of Suffolk's daughter, Lady Jane Grey. Jane was also originally excluded on the premise that no woman could reign over England. Nonetheless, the will, which originally referred to Jane's heirs-male, was amended to refer to Jane and her heirs-male. Upon Edward VI's death in 1553, Jane was proclaimed Queen of England and Ireland. She was not universally recognised and after nine days she was overthrown by the popular Mary. As Henry VIII's will had been approved by the Succession to the Crown Act 1543, Edward's contravening will was ignored as unlawful. Mary's husband Philip was recognised as King jure uxoris from 1554 to 1558.

Mary I was succeeded by her half-sister, Elizabeth I, who broke with the precedents of many of her predecessors, and refused to name an heir. Whilst previous monarchs (including Henry VIII) had specifically been granted authority to settle uncertain successions in their wills, the Treasons Act 1571 asserted that Parliament had the right to settle disputes, and made it treason to deny parliamentary authority. Wary of threats from other possible heirs, Parliament further passed the Safety of the Queen, etc. Act 1584, which provided that any individual involved in attempts to murder the sovereign would be disqualified from succeeding (the act was repealed in 1863).

=== Scotland ===
The House of Stewart (later Stuart) had ruled in Scotland since 1371. It followed strict rules of primogeniture. In 1503 King James IV married Margaret Tudor, a daughter of England's Henry VII, which one hundred years later resulted in his great-grandson James VI inheriting the English Crown as well.

In 1543, Henry VIII had attempted to marry his son Edward to Mary, Queen of Scots, which would have drawn the kingdoms closer together. This marriage plan, outlined by the Treaty of Greenwich, was resisted by Scots who favoured the Auld Alliance with France. A nine-year war resulted, now known as the Rough Wooing. In July 1565, Mary, Queen of Scots, married Henry Stuart, Lord Darnley, a grandson of Margaret Tudor. Mary, Queen of Scots, was deposed in June 1567 and there was civil war in Scotland until May 1573. For the rest of the 16th century England's diplomatic relations with Scotland were characterised by a so-called "amity". Elizabeth I did not publicly name Mary's son James VI as her successor, but gave him an annual cash subsidy.

=== After the union of the crowns ===
==== Stuarts ====
In 1603 Elizabeth I of England and Ireland was succeeded by King James VI of Scotland, her first cousin twice removed, even though his succession violated Henry VIII's will, under which Lady Anne Stanley, heiress of Mary Tudor, Duchess of Suffolk, was supposed to succeed. James asserted that hereditary right was superior to statutory provision and, as King of Scotland, was powerful enough to deter any rival. He reigned as James I of England and Ireland, thus effecting the Union of the Crowns, although England and Scotland remained separate sovereign states until 1707. His succession was rapidly ratified by Parliament.

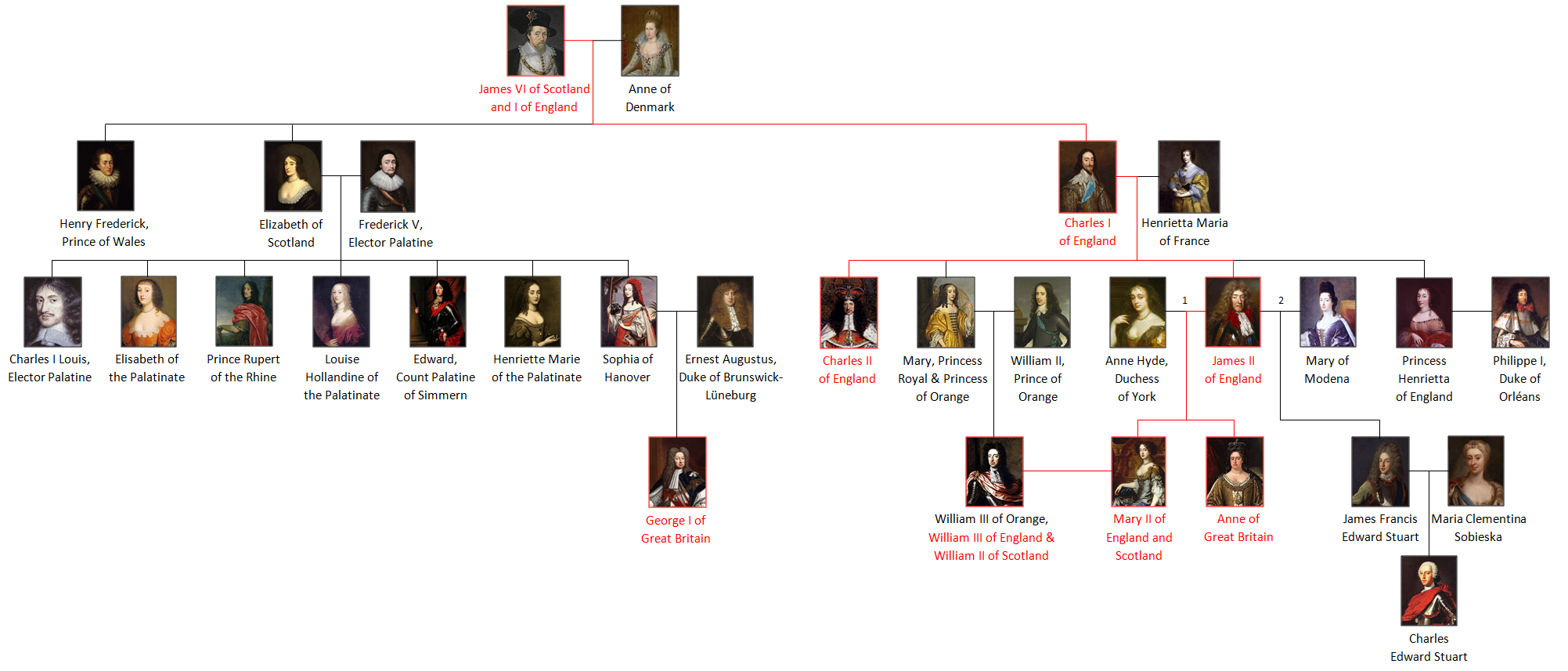
Principal members of the house of Stuart following the 1603 Union of the Crowns

James's eldest surviving son and successor, Charles I, was overthrown and beheaded in 1649 and the monarchy was abolished. A few years later, it was replaced by the Protectorate under Oliver Cromwell, a de facto monarch with the title of Lord Protector rather than King. Cromwell had the right to name his successor, which he exercised on his deathbed by choosing his son, Richard Cromwell. Richard was ineffective and was quickly forced from office. Shortly afterwards, the monarchy was restored, with Charles I's son Charles II as King.

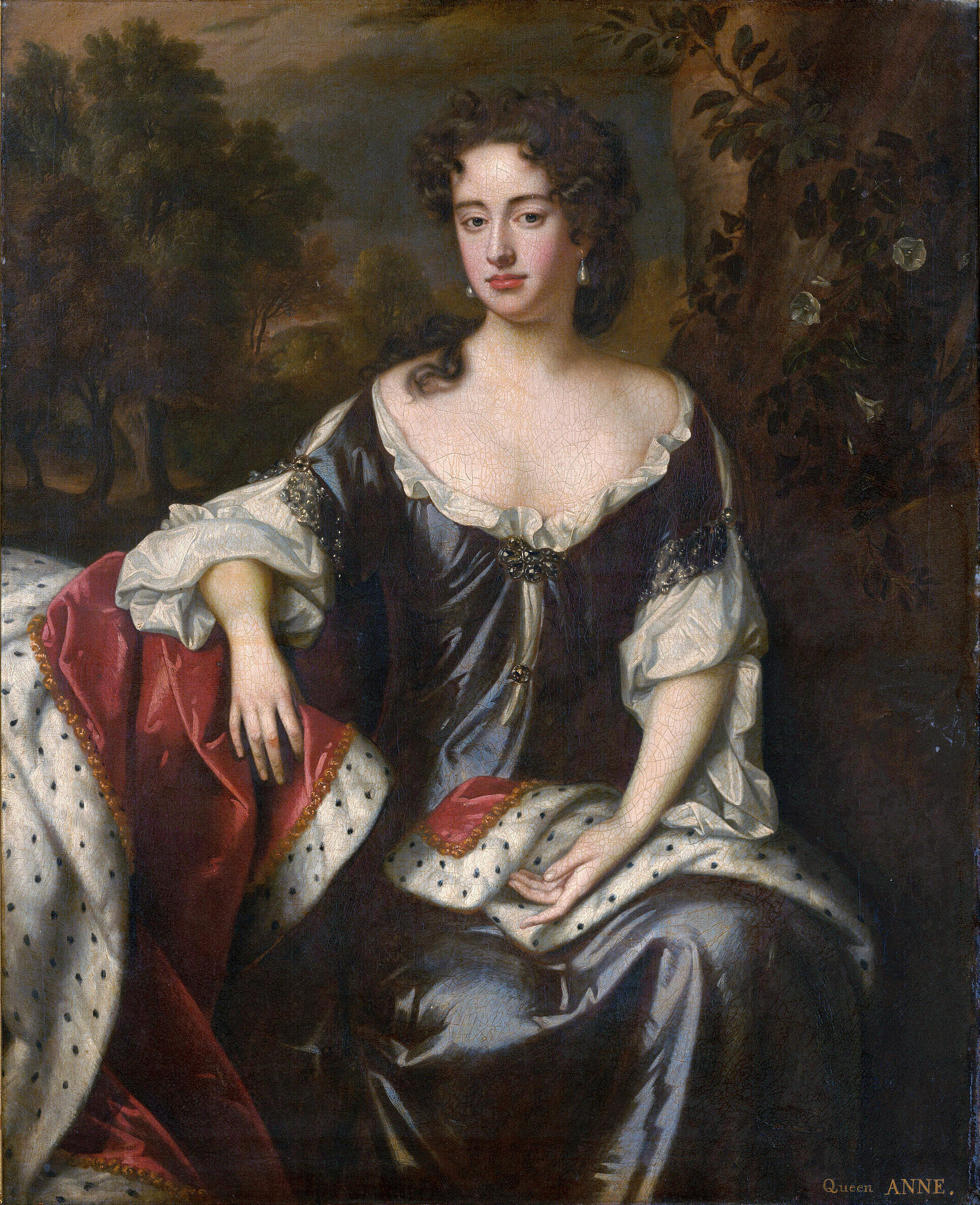
After her last child died in 1700, only Princess Anne was left in the line of succession set by the Bill of Rights.

James II and VII, a Roman Catholic, followed his brother Charles II, despite efforts in the late 1670s to exclude him in favour of Charles's illegitimate Protestant son, the Duke of Monmouth. James was deposed when his Protestant opponents forced him to flee from England in 1688. Parliament then deemed that James had, by fleeing the realms, abdicated the thrones and offered the Crowns not to the King's infant son James but to his Protestant daughter Mary and to her husband William, who as James's nephew was the first person in the succession not descended from him. The two became joint Sovereigns (a unique circumstance in British history) as William III of England and Ireland (and II of Scotland) and Mary II of England, Scotland and Ireland. William had insisted on this unique provision as a condition of his military leadership against James.

The English Bill of Rights and the Scottish Claim of Right Act, both passed in 1689, determined succession to the English, Scottish and Irish Thrones. First in the line were the descendants of Mary II. Next came Mary's sister Princess Anne and her descendants. Finally, the descendants of William by any future marriage were added to the line of succession. Only Protestants were allowed to succeed; those who married Roman Catholics were excluded.

After Mary II died in 1694, her husband continued to reign alone until his own death in 1702. The line of succession provided for by the Bill of Rights was almost at an end; William and Mary had no children and Princess Anne's children had died. Parliament passed the Act of Settlement 1701. The act maintained the provision of the Bill of Rights whereby William would be succeeded by Princess Anne and her descendants, and thereafter by his own descendants from future marriages. The act declared that they would be followed by James I and VI's granddaughter Sophia, Electress Dowager of Hanover (the daughter of James's daughter Elizabeth Stuart), and her heirs. As under the Bill of Rights, non-Protestants and those who married Roman Catholics were excluded. Because Sophia was a foreign citizen, Parliament passed the Sophia Naturalization Act 1705 to make her and her descendants English and therefore eligible for the throne.

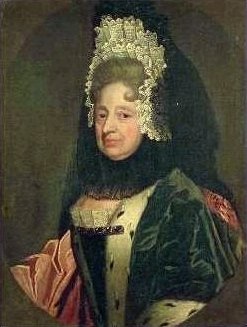
Electress Sophia of Hanover (1630–1714)

Upon William's death, Anne became Queen of England, Scotland and Ireland. Because the Parliament of England settled on Sophia as Anne's heir-presumptive without consulting Scottish leaders, the Estates of Scotland retaliated by passing the Scottish Act of Security 1704. The act provided that, upon the death of Anne, the Estates would meet to select an heir to the throne of Scotland, who could not be the same person as the English Sovereign unless numerous political and economic conditions were met. Anne originally withheld royal assent, but was forced to grant it when the estates refused to raise taxes and sought to withdraw troops from the queen's army. England's Parliament responded by passing the Alien Act 1705, which threatened to cripple Scotland's economy by cutting off trade with them. Thus, Scotland had little choice but to unite with England to form the Kingdom of Great Britain in 1707; the crown of the new nation (along with the crown of Ireland) was subject to the rules laid down by the English Act of Settlement.

==== Hanoverians and Windsors ====
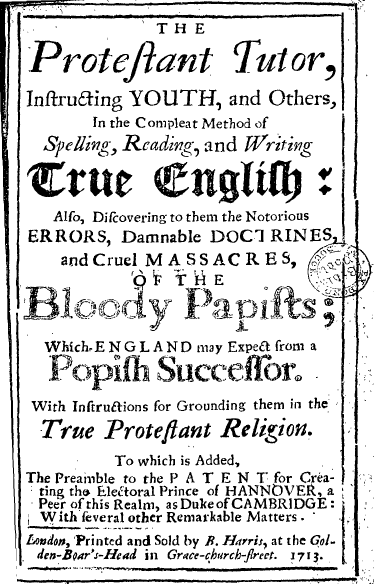
Benjamin Harris's Protestant Tutor, a primer popular for decades and the source for the New England Primer. Edition of 1713. Hanoverian propaganda extended to books for children's education.

Anne was predeceased by Sophia and was therefore succeeded by the latter's son, who became George I in 1714.

Attempts were made in the risings of 1715 and 1745 to restore Stuart claimants to the Throne, supported by those who recognised the Jacobite succession. The House of Hanover nonetheless remained undeposed, and the Crown descended in accordance with the appointed rules. In 1801, following the Acts of Union 1800, the separate crowns of Great Britain and Ireland were merged and became the United Kingdom of Great Britain and Ireland. Between 1811 and 1820, when George III was deemed unfit to rule, the Prince of Wales (later George IV) acted as his regent. Some years later, the Regency Act 1830 made provision for a change in the line of succession had a child been born to William IV after his death, but this event did not come about. On the death of William IV in 1837, his 18-year-old niece Victoria succeeded to the throne. After a 63-year reign, often known as the Victorian era, she was succeeded in 1901 by her eldest son Edward VII. On his death in 1910, his second son acceded to the throne as George V (Edward's first son Prince Albert Victor died during an influenza pandemic in 1892).

Edward VIII became king on the death of his father, George V, in January 1936. Edward opened Parliament in November, but abdicated in December 1936, and was never crowned. Edward had desired to marry Wallis Simpson, a divorcee, but the Church of England, of which the British Sovereign is Supreme Governor, would not authorise the marriage of divorcees. Consequently, Parliament passed His Majesty's Declaration of Abdication Act 1936, by which Edward VIII ceased to be Sovereign "immediately upon" his royal assent as King being signified in Parliament on 11 December. The act provided that he and his descendants, if any, were not to have any "right, title or interest in or to the succession to the Throne". Edward died childless in 1972.

Edward's abdication was "a demise of the Crown" (in the words of the act), and the Duke of York, his brother who was then next in the line, immediately succeeded to the throne and to its "rights, privileges, and dignities", taking the regnal name George VI. He in turn was succeeded in 1952 by his elder daughter, Elizabeth II. By that time, the monarch of the United Kingdom no longer reigned in the greater part of Ireland (which had become a republic in 1949), but was the monarch of a number of independent sovereign states (Commonwealth realms). She was then succeeded in 2022 by her eldest son, Charles III.

=== Commonwealth realms ===
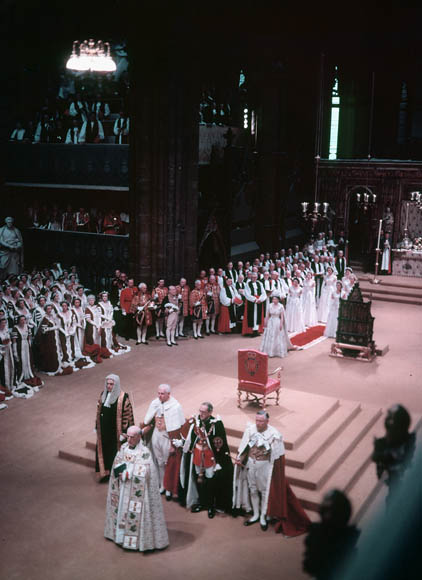
Elizabeth II at her coronation in 1953, passing to the left of the Coronation Chair

The Statute of Westminster 1931, enshrined in law in the United Kingdom, Canada and Australia (though repealed in New Zealand under the Constitution Act 1986), recognised "a common allegiance to the Crown" in its preamble and established a constitutional convention that any "alteration in the law touching the Succession to the Throne or the Royal Style and Titles" would require the assent of each of the dominion parliaments as well as the UK Parliament. (Note: The convention requiring parliamentary assent from each realm to a change in the royal style and titles was created when a uniform single title existed for the British monarch. However, with the accession of Elizabeth II in 1952, this was replaced by an agreement that each realm would pass its own Royal Style and Titles Act, allowing the monarch's title to vary in each realm but sharing a common format.) However, this unity of action was tested with the 1936 abdication of Edward VIII when the Irish Free State implemented the abdication a day later than the United Kingdom and the other dominions, creating a 24-hour divergence whereby Edward VIII was king in the Irish Free State and George VI was king elsewhere. The convention was reaffirmed with the 2011 Perth Agreement, whereby the Commonwealth realms co-operated to end male-preference primogeniture in favour of absolute primogeniture wherein succession passes to an individual's children according to birth order, with the changes coming into force in unison on 26 March 2015. The changes also removed a bar on those who marry Roman Catholics from succeeding to the throne, although the ban on Catholics themselves was retained in order to ensure that the monarch would remain in communion with the Church of England, of which they are Supreme Governor.

The changes applied to the order of succession for people born after 28 October 2011, and the positions of the first 27 in line remained unchanged, including Princess Anne and her children and grandchildren, until the birth of Princess Charlotte of Cambridge on 2 May 2015. The first to be affected by the changes, on the day they came into effect on 26 March of that year, were the children of Lady Davina Windsor—her son Tāne Mahuta Lewis (born 2012) and her daughter Senna Kowhai Lewis (born 2010)—who were reversed in the order of succession, becoming 29th and 28th in line respectively (now 36th and 35th as of September 2022).

== Current rules ==
The Bill of Rights and the Act of Settlement (restated by the Acts of Union) still govern succession to the throne. They were amended in the United Kingdom by the Succession to the Crown Act 2013, which was passed mainly "to make succession to the Crown not depend on gender" and "to make provision about Royal Marriages" (according to its long title), thereby implementing the Perth Agreement in the UK and in those realms that, by their laws, have as their monarch automatically whoever is monarch of the UK. Other realms passed their own legislation.

Anyone ineligible to succeed is treated as if they were dead. That person's descendants are not also disqualified, unless they are personally ineligible.

=== Marriages ===
The Act of Settlement 1701 provides that Protestant "heirs of the body" (that is, legitimate descendants) of Sophia, Electress of Hanover, are eligible to succeed to the throne, unless otherwise disqualified. The meaning of heir of the body is determined by the common law rules of male preference primogeniture (the "male-preference" criterion is no longer applicable, in respect of succession to the throne, to persons born after 28 October 2011), whereby older children and their descendants inherit before younger children, and a male child takes precedence over a female sibling. Children born out of wedlock and adopted children are not eligible to succeed. Illegitimate children whose parents subsequently marry are legitimated, but remain ineligible to inherit. (Note: Neither the Legitimacy Act 1926 nor the Legitimacy Act 1959 changed the Law of Succession.)

The Royal Marriages Act 1772 (repealed by the Succession to the Crown Act 2013) further required descendants of George II to obtain the consent of the reigning monarch to marry. (The requirement did not apply to descendants of princesses who married into foreign families, as well as, from 1936, any descendants of Edward VIII, (Note: Per His Majesty's Declaration of Abdication Act 1936.) of whom there are none.) The act provided, however, that if a dynast older than 25 notified the Privy Council of their intention to marry without the consent of the Sovereign, then they may have lawfully done so after one year, unless both houses of Parliament expressly disapproved of the marriage. A marriage that contravened the Royal Marriages Act was void, and the resulting offspring illegitimate and thus ineligible to succeed, though the succession of the dynast who failed to obtain consent was not itself affected. This also had the consequence that marriage to a Roman Catholic without permission was void, so that the dynast was not disqualified from succeeding on account of being married to a Roman Catholic. Thus when the future George IV attempted to marry the Roman Catholic Maria Fitzherbert in 1785 without obtaining permission from George III he did not disqualify himself from inheriting the throne in due course. A marriage voided by the 1772 act prior to its repeal remains void "for all purposes relating to the succession to the Crown" under the 2013 act.

The constitutional crisis arising from Edward VIII's decision to marry a divorcee in 1936 led to His Majesty's Declaration of Abdication Act 1936, which provided that Edward VIII and his descendants would have no claim to the throne. The act is no longer applicable, because Edward died in 1972 without issue.

Under the Succession to the Crown Act 2013, the first six persons in line to the throne must obtain the sovereign's approval before marrying. Marriage without the Sovereign's consent disqualifies the person and the person's descendants from the marriage from succeeding to the Crown, but the marriage is still legally valid.

=== Religion ===
Rules relating to eligibility established by the Bill of Rights are retained under the Act of Settlement and the Acts of Union 1707. Under Article II of the Treaty of Union between England and Scotland (which was given legal force by the acts of the English and Scottish parliaments), the succession to the throne is limited to "the Heirs of [Electress Sophia's] body being Protestants." The Act of Settlement also states that "whosoever shall hereafter come to the Possession of this Crown shall join in Communion with the Church of England". The definition of being "in Communion with the Church of England" has been interpreted broadly; for instance, King George I was Lutheran.

The Bill of Rights specifically excludes Roman Catholics from being sovereign, to the extent that they "shall be excluded and be for ever uncapeable to inherit possesse or enjoy the Crowne", thus ignoring any potential conversion from Roman Catholicism to Protestantism. As such, a Roman Catholic is viewed as "naturally dead" for the purposes of succession. The Act of Settlement further provided that anyone who married a Roman Catholic was ineligible to succeed. The act did not require that the spouse be Anglican; it only barred those who married Roman Catholics. The Succession to the Crown Act 2013 removed the ban on individuals who marry Roman Catholics, though not on Roman Catholics themselves, because the monarch is Supreme Governor of the Church of England.

=== Treason ===
Under the Treason Act 1702 and the Treason (Ireland) Act 1703, it is treason to "endeavour to deprive or hinder any person who shall be the next in succession to the crown [...] from succeeding [...] to the imperial crown of this realm". Since the Crime and Disorder Act 1998, the maximum penalty has been life imprisonment.

== Accession ==
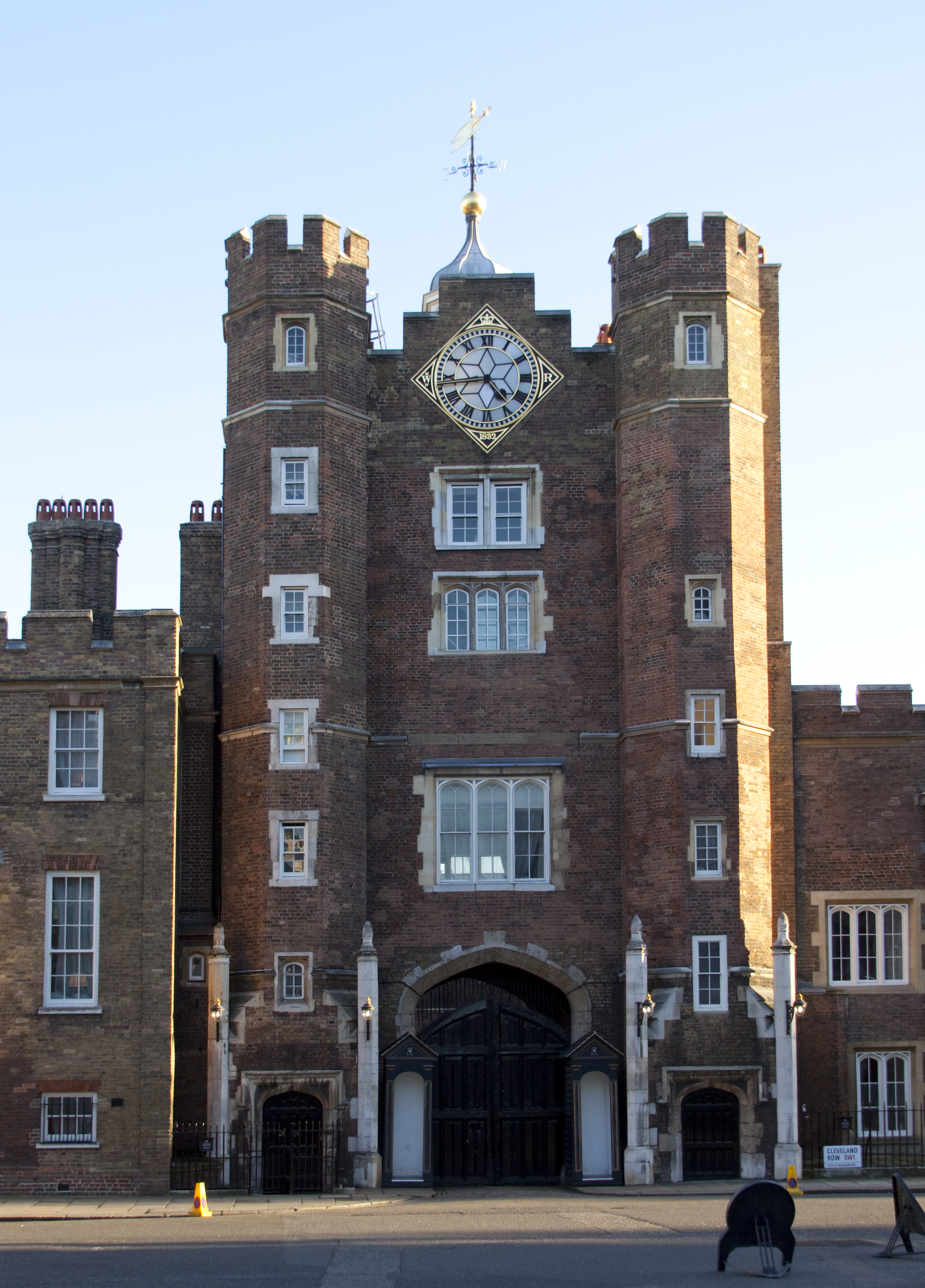
The Accession Council normally meets in St James's Palace to proclaim the new sovereign.

In the Commonwealth realms, upon the death of a sovereign, the heir apparent or heir presumptive succeeds to the throne immediately, with no need for confirmation or further ceremony. (Note: A letter from Tony Newton as Lord President of the Council to Tony Benn indicated this was the effect of the Act of Settlement after Benn had indicated he intended to block the next accession at the Privy Council.) Nevertheless, the Accession Council meets and decides upon the making of the accession proclamation, which by custom has for centuries been ceremonially proclaimed in public places, in London, York, Edinburgh and other cities. The anniversary is observed throughout the sovereign's reign as Accession Day, including royal gun salutes in the United Kingdom.

Formerly, a new sovereign proclaimed their own accession; however, on the death of Elizabeth I, an Accession Council met to proclaim the accession of James I to the throne of England. James was then in Scotland and reigning as King James VI of Scotland. This precedent has been followed since. Now, the Accession Council normally meets in St James's Palace. Proclamations since James I's have usually been made in the name of the Lords Spiritual and Temporal, the Privy Council, the Lord Mayor, Aldermen and citizens of the City of London and "other principal Gentlemen of quality", though there have been variations in some proclamations. The proclamation of accession of Elizabeth II was the first to make mention of representatives of members of the Commonwealth.

Upon their accession, a new sovereign is required by law to make and subscribe several oaths. The Bill of Rights of 1689 first required the sovereign to make a public declaration of non-belief in Roman Catholicism. (Note: This declaration was similar to what members of both Houses of Parliament were originally required to take by the Test Acts. Eventually, by the time it was changed in 1910, the monarch was the only one left required to make the declaration.) This declaration, known as the Accession Declaration, is required to be taken either at the first meeting of parliament of their reign (i.e. during the State Opening of Parliament) or at their coronation, whichever occurs first. The wording of the declaration was changed in 1910 as the previous wording was deemed to be overly anti-Catholic. Rather than denouncing Roman Catholicism, the sovereign now declares themselves to be a Protestant and that they will "uphold and maintain" the Protestant succession. In addition to the Accession Declaration, the new sovereign is required by the Acts of Union 1707 to make an oath to "maintain and preserve" the Church of Scotland. This oath is normally made at the sovereign's first meeting of the Privy Council following their accession. According to the Regency Act 1937, should the sovereign be under the age of 18, such oaths and declarations required to be taken by the sovereign shall be made upon attainment of that age.

After a period of mourning, the new sovereign is usually consecrated and crowned in Westminster Abbey. Normally, the Archbishop of Canterbury officiates, though the sovereign may designate any other bishop of the Church of England. A coronation is not necessary for a sovereign to reign; for example, Edward VIII was never crowned, yet during his short reign was the undoubted king.

== Regency Act 1937 ==
In the event that the sovereign is under 18, or is incapacitated, the first person in the line of succession who is over the age of 21 (or 18 in the case of the heir apparent) and is domiciled in the United Kingdom becomes regent, and exercises the powers of the sovereign.

The first four individuals in the line of succession who are over 21 (or 18 in the case of the heir), and the sovereign's consort, may be appointed counsellors of state. Counsellors of state perform some of the sovereign's duties in the United Kingdom while the sovereign is out of the country or temporarily incapacitated.

Otherwise, individuals in the line of succession need not have specific legal or official roles.

Princess Anne and Prince Edward were added as extra counsellors of state in 2022 by an act of Parliament, following the death of Elizabeth II.

== See also ==
- Accession Declaration Act 1910
- Alternative successions of the English crown
- British prince
- British princess
- Family tree of the British royal family
- History of the English and British line of succession
- Jacobite succession
- List of British monarchs
- List of descendants of George V
- List of heirs to the British throne
- List of heirs to the English throne
- List of heirs to the Scottish throne
- List of monarchs in the British Isles
- Posthumous birth
- Royal Succession Bills and Acts
  - Succession to the Crown Act 2013 (United Kingdom)
  - Succession to the Throne Act, 2013 (Canada)
  - Royal Succession Act 2013 (New Zealand)
  - Succession to the Crown Act 2015 (Australia)
