= Lady Helen Taylor =

Relative of the British royal family (born 1964)

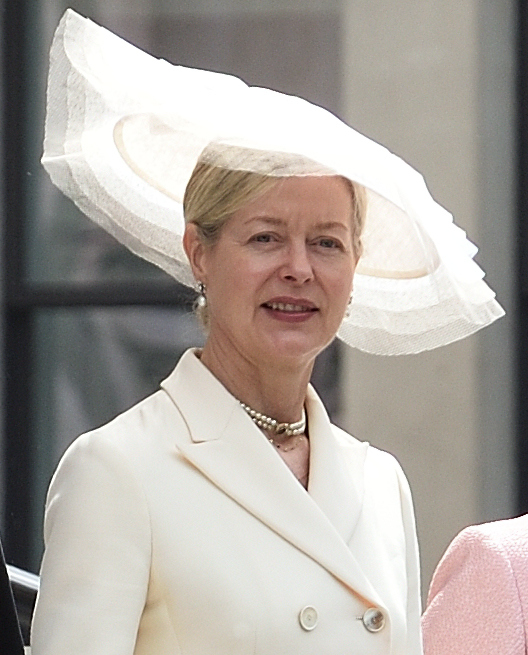
- Taylor in 2022
- Born: Lady Helen Marina Lucy Windsor; 28 April 1964 (age 62); Iver, Buckinghamshire, England
- Occupation: Business representative
- Spouse: Timothy Taylor (m. 1992)
- Children: 4
- Parents: Prince Edward, Duke of Kent (father); Katharine Worsley (mother)
- Relatives: House of Windsor
- Education: St Mary's School, Wantage; Gordonstoun

Lady Helen Marina Lucy Taylor (née Windsor; born 28 April 1964) is a relative of the British royal family. She is the daughter of Prince Edward, Duke of Kent, and Katharine, Duchess of Kent, and a great-granddaughter of King George V.

== Early life and youth ==
Lady Helen Marina Lucy Windsor was born on 28 April 1964 at Coppins, a country house in Iver, Buckinghamshire, the only daughter of the Duke and Duchess of Kent. She was christened on 6 June in the private chapel at Windsor Castle by the Dean of Windsor Rt. Rev. Robin Woods. Her godparents were Princess Margaret, Countess of Snowdon; Hon. Angus Ogilvy, Myra Butter, and Sir Philip Hay.

She was educated at Eton End School in Datchet, then at St Mary's School, Wantage, and Gordonstoun. At Gordonstoun, she was one of 20 sixth form girls "in the robustly masculine environment of Gordonstoun," wrote Alan Hamilton.

She was called "Melons" in the popular press.

I was slightly chubby, it was the boys at Gordonstoun who called me that. I think there are only about two people who call me that now. The original context has long gone.

During the 1980s, her boyfriend was Nigel Oakes, who "appalled the Queen" after she smuggled him into her parents' grace-and-favour home, York House, St James's Palace.

According to Lol Tolhurst of The Cure, Helen was a "mad Cure fan" who visited the band backstage at a gig in Bath in 1983.

== Career ==
After she left Gordonstoun (where she had art class), she was desperate to come to London and earn money, starting in 1984 at Christie's auction house in their Contemporary Department.

Helen worked with the art dealer Karsten Schubert between 1987 and 1991, behind the front desk, and was later credited with discovering Rachel Whiteread and Gary Hume, but confessed in a television interview that she had turned down representing artist Damien Hirst.

For 17 years, Helen was a fashion ambassador and muse to Giorgio Armani.

== Marriage and children ==
At some point Helen reportedly dated David Flint Wood, who would later marry her cousin India Hicks.

At 19, Helen met Timothy Verner Taylor (born 8 August 1963), an art dealer. They married nine years later, on 18 July 1992, at St. George's Chapel, Windsor Castle. The bride wore a Catherine Walker design. Giorgio Armani provided an outfit for her wedding.

In 1998, her husband was diagnosed with Hodgkin's disease.

Helen and her husband have four children, who immediately follow her in the Line of succession to the British throne:

- Columbus George Donald Taylor (born 6 August 1994)
- Cassius Edward Taylor (born 26 December 1996)
- Eloise Olivia Katherine Taylor (born 2 March 2003)
- Estella Olga Elizabeth Taylor (born 21 December 2004)

== Charity work ==
She is a patron of the CLIC Sargent children's cancer charity.

She is a trustee of The Royal Marsden Cancer Charity.

She is on the advisory board of the Glyndebourne Festival Opera after being a trustee.

== Authored articles ==
- "Lady Helen Taylor Pays Tribute To Her Dear Friend, Mr Armani: "He Was Such A Tease"". British Vogue. 19 October 2025.

Lady Helen Taylor Born: 28 April 1964
Lines of succession
Preceded by Louis Windsor	Line of succession to the British throne granddaughter of George, Duke of Kent great-granddaughter of George V	Succeeded by Columbus Taylor
