= Edward Windsor, Lord Downpatrick =

English fashion designer

Lord Downpatrick
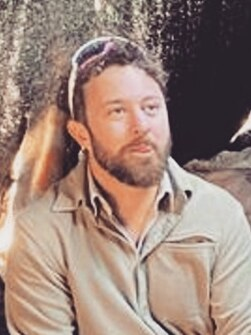
- Downpatrick in 2024
- Born: Edward Edmund Maximilian George Windsor; 2 December 1988 (age 37); London, England
- Education: Eton College; Keble College, Oxford
- Occupations: Travel consultant, fashion designer
- Title: Lord Downpatrick
- Parents: George Windsor, Earl of St Andrews (father); Sylvana Tomaselli (mother)
- Family: House of Windsor

Edward Edmund Maximilian George Windsor, Lord Downpatrick (born 2 December 1988), known professionally as Eddy Downpatrick, is a British travel consultant, fashion designer, and former financial analyst. He is a member of the extended British royal family.

As second-in-line to the Dukedom of Kent, he uses one of his grandfather's subsidiary titles, Baron Downpatrick, by courtesy. A second cousin once removed of Charles III, Downpatrick is the most senior member of the House of Windsor to be excluded from the line of succession to the British throne owing to his Roman Catholic faith.

== Early life and family ==
Edward Edmund Maximilian George Windsor was born on 2 December 1988 at St Mary's Hospital, London, and grew up in Cambridge. He is the eldest child of George Windsor, Earl of St Andrews, son and heir apparent of Prince Edward, Duke of Kent. Downpatrick's mother, Sylvana, Countess of St Andrews, a member by birth of the Austrian Tomaselli family, is a Canadian-born historian of Austro-Italian and French extraction. Diana, Princess of Wales, was his godmother.

Downpatrick was educated at Eton College and matriculated at Keble College, Oxford, where he studied modern languages with a specialisation in French and German. He had intended to join the British Army after the university, but had not recovered from rugby injuries.

== Career ==
Downpatrick first had the idea of launching a fashion brand while hiking in Scotland in 2009, but chose to focus on his studies and his career as a financial analyst at JP Morgan.

He left JP Morgan and began working as a fashion designer in 2016. In 2017, he co-founded the fashion label FIDIR with Justine Dalby, where he serves as creative director. The brand specialises in outdoor wear and accessories, producing items such as handbags, wallets, sweatshirts, wash bags, and T-shirts. His designs are inspired by the Scottish Highlands.

In 2021, Downpatrick founded Aristeia Travel, a company that organises tours and expeditions to destinations across, Europe, Asia, Africa, and Latin America. The company also arranges sporting adventures, such as heliskiing and whale watching.

Downpatrick is also a partner at Wheeler-Windsor Expeditions, alongside California native Jack Wheeler, offering curated expeditions to clients.

== Succession rights ==
In 2003, aged 15, following the example of his grandmother, the Duchess of Kent, and his uncle Lord Nicholas Windsor, Downpatrick – who had been baptised in the Church of England – chose to be confirmed into the Catholic Church. He therefore lost his place in the line of succession to the British throne under the Act of Settlement 1701. As a second cousin once removed of King Charles III, Downpatrick is the most senior person excluded from the line of succession for being a Catholic.

As of November 2026, he would have been 45th in line. Downpatrick remains second in the line of succession, after his father, to the Dukedom of Kent.
