= Timothy Taylor (art dealer) =

English art dealer (born 1963)

- Born: 8 August 1963 (age 62); Devon, United Kingdom
- Occupation: Art dealer
- Spouse: Lady Helen Taylor (m. 1992)
- Children: 4

Timothy Vernon Taylor (born 8 August 1963) is an English gallerist and art dealer.

His eponymous gallery represents more than twenty international artists and estates, with spaces in London and New York. He is also distantly related to the British royal family by his wife.

== Work ==
Taylor began his career working for London dealers Bernard Jacobson and Leslie Waddington before opening Timothy Taylor Gallery in 1996 on Bruton Place in Mayfair. He played a critical role in advancing the careers of several emerging artists at the forefront of the 1990s London art scene, among them Fiona Rae, Sean Scully, and Richard Patterson. In addition to his representation of emerging and established contemporary artists, Taylor has worked closely with the estates of many artists of the post-war period, including Philip Guston, Diane Arbus, Jean Dubuffet, Hans Hartung, Simon Hantaï, and Antoni Tàpies.

In 2016, Taylor expanded the gallery to New York, first opening a location on 19th Street in Chelsea before relocating to a flagship space in Tribeca in 2023. After nearly a decade of operation, the gallery closed its New York outpost in 2026.

== Personal life ==
Taylor lives in London with his wife, Lady Helen Taylor. They have four children, one of whom works at the gallery.
