= Prince Edward, Duke of Kent =

British prince (born 1935)

Prince Edward
- Duke of Kent (more)
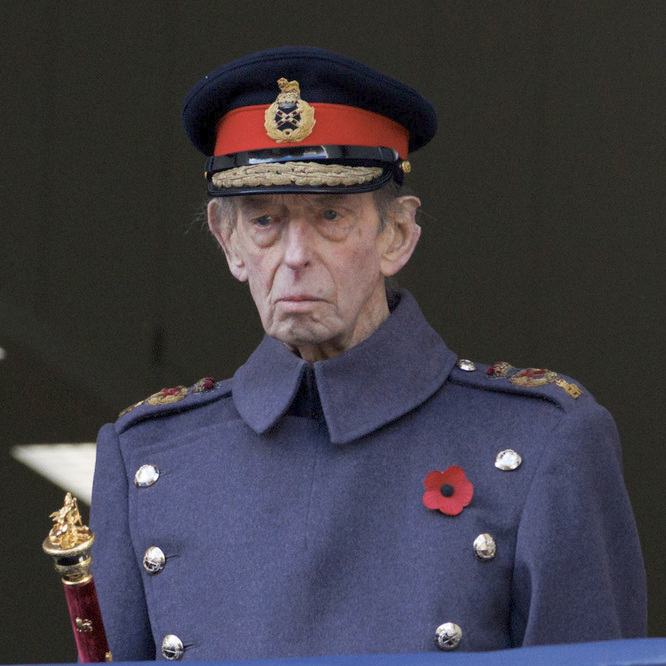
- Edward in 2025
- Born: Prince Edward of Kent; 9 October 1935 (age 91); Belgravia, London, England
- Spouse: Katharine Worsley (m. 1961; died 2025)
- Issue more...: George Windsor, Earl of St Andrews; Lady Helen Taylor; Lord Nicholas Windsor
Names
- Edward George Nicholas Paul Patrick (Note: As a British prince, a surname is not usually used but when one is, Windsor is used.)
- House: Windsor
- Father: Prince George, Duke of Kent
- Mother: Princess Marina of Greece and Denmark

Member of the House of Lords Lord Temporal
- Hereditary peerage 9 December 1959 – 11 November 1999
- Preceded by: The 1st Duke of Kent
- Succeeded by: Seat abolished
- Military career
- Branch: British Army
- Years of active service: 1955–1976
- Rank: Field Marshal
- Service number: 443787
- Units: Royal Scots Greys (until 1971); Royal Scots Dragoon Guards

Prince Edward, Duke of Kent (Edward George Nicholas Paul Patrick; born 9 October 1935), is a member of the British royal family. The elder son of Prince George, Duke of Kent, and Princess Marina of Greece and Denmark, he is a grandson of George V, nephew of Edward VIII and George VI, and first cousin of Elizabeth II. Edward's mother was also a first cousin of Prince Philip, Elizabeth's husband, making him both a second cousin and first cousin once removed to Charles III. He is 43rd in the line of succession to the British throne. In 2025, following the death of his wife, Katharine, Duchess of Kent, Edward became the oldest living member of the British royal family.

Edward has held the title of Duke of Kent for over 84 years, making him the longest-serving duke in British history. He inherited the title at the age of six in 1942, following his father's death in a plane crash. Edward carried out engagements on behalf of Elizabeth II and is involved with over 140 charitable organisations.

He was president of the All England Lawn Tennis and Croquet Club, presenting the trophies to the Wimbledon champion and runner-up, and served as the United Kingdom's Special Representative for International Trade and Investment, retiring in 2001. He is joint president of the Scout Association, and president of the Royal United Services Institute and the Royal Institution of Great Britain, president of the Army & Navy Club, and, since 1967, grand master of the United Grand Lodge of England. Edward has been chancellor of the University of Surrey since June 1976. Much of his charity work revolves around war remembrance, technology, and the growth of British industry.

== Early life and education ==
Edward was born at 2:05 am on 9 October 1935 at 3 Belgrave Square, London, the eldest child of Prince George, Duke of Kent, and Princess Marina, Duchess of Kent. The Home Secretary, Sir John Simon, was present to verify the birth. His father was the fourth son of King George V and Queen Mary, and his mother was the daughter of Prince Nicholas of Greece and Denmark and Grand Duchess Elena Vladimirovna of Russia. He was baptised in the Private Chapel at Buckingham Palace on 20 November by the Archbishop of Canterbury, Cosmo Lang. His godparents were his grandparents, King George V, Queen Mary, and Prince Nicholas of Greece and Denmark; the Prince of Wales; the Princess Royal; the Duke of Connaught and Strathearn (whose son, Prince Arthur of Connaught, stood proxy); and the Duchess of Argyll.

Edward began his education at Ludgrove, a preparatory school in Berkshire, before going on to Eton College, and subsequently Le Rosey in Switzerland. After leaving school he entered the Royal Military Academy Sandhurst, where he was awarded the Sir James Moncrieff Grierson prize for foreign languages. Edward speaks fluent French, having been raised in a house where, according to his younger brother, Prince Michael of Kent, their mother and aunts spoke French as a matter of preference.

On 25 August 1942, Edward's father was killed when his aircraft crashed in bad weather in Caithness, Scotland. Edward, then six years old, succeeded to his father's titles as Duke of Kent, Earl of St Andrews, and Baron Downpatrick. As a member of the royal family he began undertaking public engagements at an early age. In 1952, aged 16, he walked behind the coffin of his uncle, George VI, at the King's state funeral. The following year he attended the coronation of his cousin, Elizabeth II, and was the third to pay homage at her throne, following the dukes of Edinburgh and Gloucester.

== Military service ==
On 29 July 1955, Edward graduated from the Royal Military Academy Sandhurst as a second lieutenant in the Royal Scots Greys, marking the beginning of a military career that lasted more than 20 years. He was promoted to captain on 29 July 1961.

From 1962 to 1963, Edward served in Hong Kong, later joining the staff in Eastern Command. He was promoted to major on 31 December 1967. In 1970, he commanded a squadron of his regiment in Cyprus as part of the United Nations Peacekeeping Force in Cyprus. During the early 1970s, Edward also served briefly in Northern Ireland with his regiment. According to a 2022 publication, the Queen intervened in 1971 to prevent a potential IRA kidnapping attempt. Edward, then aged 35, had been deployed to Northern Ireland with his unit, but the Queen raised concerns during her weekly audience with the prime minister, Edward Heath. Following this, ministers instructed commanding officers that he was not to be sent to Belfast without special orders, and he was posted back to Britain a few weeks later. He was promoted to lieutenant-colonel on 30 June 1973.

Edward retired from the army on 15 April 1976. He was subsequently accorded the honorary rank of major-general on 11 June 1983, and of field marshal on 11 June 1993.

== Marriage and personal life ==
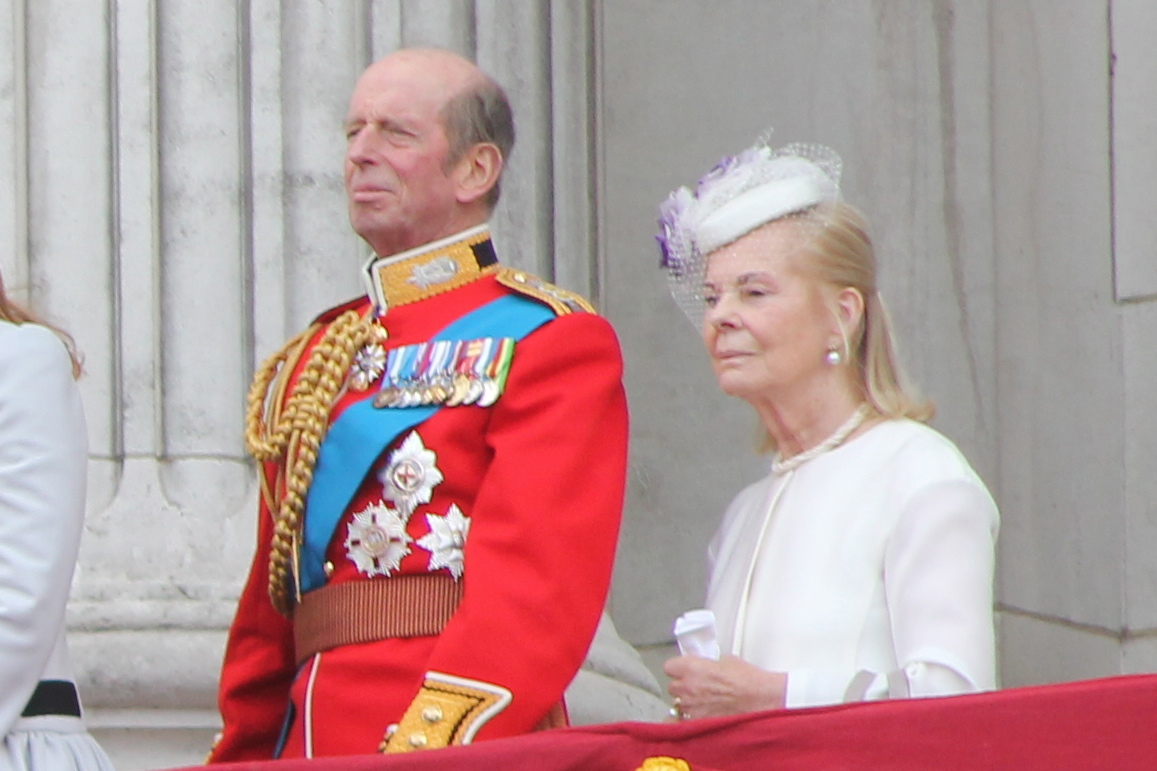
Edward and Katharine in 2013

Edward met Katharine Worsley while he was based at Catterick Garrison. She was the only daughter of Sir William Worsley, 4th Baronet, and his wife, Joyce Morgan Brunner. Marina reportedly disapproved of her son's choice of bride and twice forbade the match before agreeing to the marriage in 1961. On 8 June 1961, the couple married in York Minster. Katharine converted to Catholicism in 1994, but because the conversion occurred during, and not before, their marriage, it did not cause Edward to lose his place in the line of succession, as the Act of Settlement 1701 applied only where the spouse was a Catholic at the time of marriage. The disqualification for marrying a Catholic was removed by the Succession to the Crown Act 2013.

The couple have three living children:

- George, Earl of St Andrews, born 26 June 1962 at Coppins; married Sylvana Tomaselli
- Lady Helen Taylor, born 28 April 1964 at Coppins; married Timothy Taylor
- Lord Nicholas Windsor, born 25 July 1970 at King's College Hospital in London; married, 2006, Paola Doimi de Lupis de Frankopan

Katharine had a miscarriage in 1975 owing to rubella and gave birth to a stillborn son, Patrick, in 1977.

Edward lives at Wren House, Kensington Palace, in London. After their 1961 wedding, he and Katharine moved into Coppins, where they lived until 1972. In the early 1970s, they moved to York House at St James's Palace, before moving to Wren House at Kensington Palace in 1997. From 1972 to 1990, he and his wife leased Anmer Hall in Norfolk, part of the Sandringham Estate. They subsequently purchased Crocker End House in December 1989, before selling it in the early 2000s.

In 2011, close associates of Jonathan Rees, a private investigator connected to the News International phone hacking scandal, alleged that he had accessed the bank accounts of Edward and his wife.

Edward had a mild stroke on the morning of 18 March 2013. In April 2015, he suffered a hip injury and was in Aberdeen Royal Infirmary for further treatment.

Katharine died on 4 September 2025, aged 92. Following her death, Edward became the oldest living member of the British royal family and the last member who lived during the reign of George V and Edward VIII.

== Activities ==
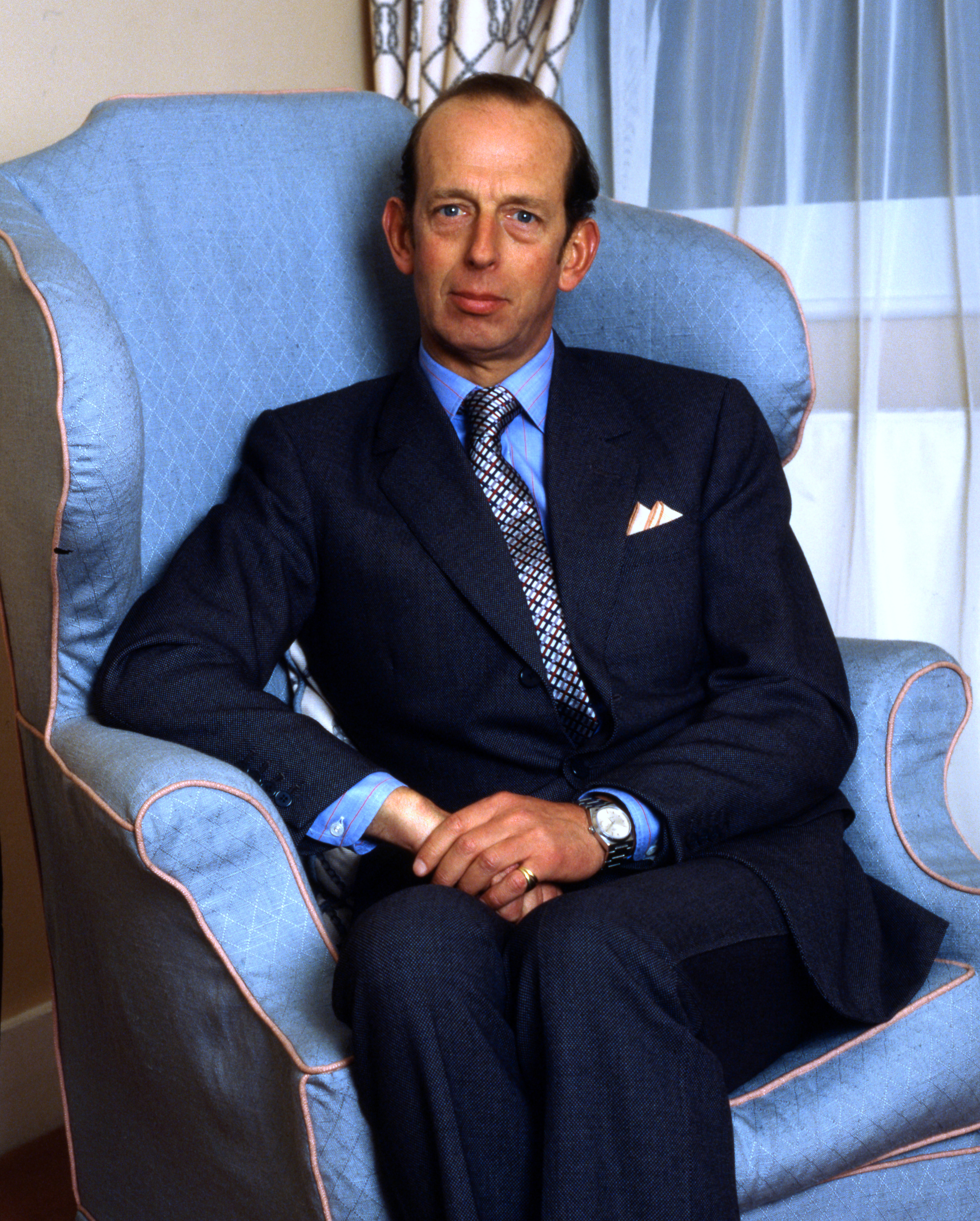
The Duke of Kent by Allan Warren, 1989 portrait photo

Edward performed engagements on behalf of his cousin, Queen Elizabeth II, for more than 50 years. He represented the Queen during independence celebrations in the Commonwealth countries of Sierra Leone, Uganda, Guyana, Gambia, and Barbados, and at the commemoration of the 50th anniversary of Ghana's independence. He also acted as Counsellor of State during periods of the Queen's absence abroad.

One of Edward's major public roles for many years was vice-chairman of British Trade International, formerly known as the British Overseas Trade Board, and later as the United Kingdom's Special Representative for International Trade and Investment. In this capacity, he travelled abroad to represent the British government in fostering trade relations with foreign countries and organisations. The then Prince Andrew succeeded him in this position, later known as UK Trade & Investment (or UKTI), although Andrew resigned from the post in 2011. In 1979, Edward became the first member of the royal family to visit China, focusing on the British Energy Exhibition in Beijing.

From 1971 to 2000, Edward served as president of The Football Association, the governing body of English football. He has been president of The Scout Association since 1975, and, together with Prince William of Wales, visited the Centenary World Scout Jamboree at Hylands Park, Chelmsford, in July 2007. He was president of the All England Lawn Tennis and Croquet Club from 1969 until 2021, succeeding his mother. He was also president of the Commonwealth War Graves Commission from 1970 until 2023. His other roles include president of the RAF Benevolent Fund, the Royal National Lifeboat Institution, the Stroke Association, the Royal United Services Institute, the Royal Institution, the British Racing Drivers' Club, and patron of the American Air Museum in Britain, Royal West Norfolk Golf Club, Kent County Cricket Club, Opera North, and Trinity Laban Conservatoire of Music and Dance. He sits on the advisory panel for the Mountbatten Medal and presents the award once the panel has reached its decision. Edward is also one of the Royal Fellows of the Royal Academy of Engineering.

For almost 29 years, Edward has been the patron of Endeavour, a national youth organisation. He has served as Royal Patron of the Honourable Society of Lincoln's Inn since 2001, a position previously held by his father. In 2015, he received the Dresden Peace Prize for "his contribution to British-German reconciliation."

On 2 June 2022, Edward appeared alongside the Queen on the balcony of Buckingham Palace during the Trooping the Colour, which formed part of the Platinum Jubilee celebrations.

Edward was colonel of the Scots Guards for 50 years from 9 September 1974 to 14 April 2024, being succeeded by the Duke of Edinburgh. At the time of his retirement, he was the regiment's longest-serving colonel.

In April 2026, Edward attended a commemorative reception held to mark the centenary of Queen Elizabeth II's birth.

== Freemasonry ==
Edward was initiated into Royal Alpha Lodge No. 16 on 16 December 1963, and was elected its Worshipful Master for 1965 and 1966.

Having been appointed Senior Grand Warden in 1966, he was elected Grand Master the following year and was installed on 14 June 1967 during the United Grand Lodge of England's 250th-anniversary celebrations at the Royal Albert Hall. He is the 10th, and longest-serving, Grand Master of UGLE, the governing body of Freemasonry in England and Wales.

In December 2013, Edward celebrated 50 years as a freemason. In October 2017, he presided over the tercentenary celebrations of UGLE, marking the 300th anniversary of the founding of the original Grand Lodge, one of the two bodies that merged to form UGLE in 1813. The main ceremony was held at the Royal Albert Hall, in the year that also marked Edward's 50th anniversary of installation as Grand Master.

== Titles, styles, honours and arms ==
=== Titles and styles ===
- 9 October 1935 – 25 August 1942: His Royal Highness Prince Edward of Kent
- 25 August 1942 – present: His Royal Highness The Duke of Kent

=== Military ranks ===
- 29 July 1955: Second Lieutenant, Royal Scots Greys
- 29 July 1957: Lieutenant, Royal Scots Greys
- 29 July 1961: Captain, Royal Scots Greys
- 31 December 1967: Major, Royal Scots Greys
- 30 June 1973: Lieutenant Colonel, Royal Scots Dragoon Guards. Retired on 15 April 1976
- 11 June 1983: Major General
- 11 June 1993: Field Marshal

=== Honours ===
- 12 May 1937: Recipient of the King George VI Coronation Medal (last surviving recipient)
- 2 June 1953: Recipient of the Queen Elizabeth II Coronation Medal
- 1960: Knight Grand Cross of the Royal Victorian Order (GCVO)
- 1961: Recipient of the Sierra Leone Independence Medal
- 1966: Recipient of the Guyana Independence Medal
- Knight Grand Cross of the Most Distinguished Order of St Michael and St George (GCMG)
  - 1967: Grand Master and First and Principal Knight Grand Cross of the Most Distinguished Order of St Michael and St George
- 6 February 1977: Recipient of the Queen Elizabeth II Silver Jubilee Medal
- 1985: Royal Knight Companion of the Most Noble Order of the Garter (KG)
- 6 February 2002: Recipient of the Queen Elizabeth II Golden Jubilee Medal
- 6 February 2012: Recipient of the Queen Elizabeth II Diamond Jubilee Medal
- Recipient of the Army Long Service and Good Conduct Medal with 3 Bars
- Recipient of the Canadian Forces' Decoration with 3 Clasps (CD)
- 6 February 2022: Recipient of the Queen Elizabeth II Platinum Jubilee Medal
- 6 May 2023: Recipient of the King Charles III Coronation Medal

==== Foreign ====
- 1970: Recipient of the United Nations Medal for the UNFICYP mission
- 1992: Recipient of the Golden Pheasant Award of the Scout Association of Japan
- (Sweden) 6 November 2000: Knight of the Royal Order of Charles XIII
- (Greece): Royal Family Order of Saints George and Constantine First class (civil division)
- (Jordan): Grand Cordon of the Supreme Order of the Renaissance (special class)
- : Grand Cordon of the Order of the Star of Jordan
- (Liberia): Knight Grand Band of the Order of the Star of Africa
- (Nepal): Order of the Three Divine Powers First Class (Jyotirmaya-Subikhyat-Tri-Shakti-Patta)
- (Norway) 1988: Grand Cross of the Royal Norwegian Order of Saint Olav
- : Grand Cross of the Order of Merit of the Republic of Poland
- Saxony 21 May 2015: Order of Merit of the Free State of Saxony

==== Civilian appointments ====
- 1 August 1966: Personal Aide-de-Camp to the Sovereign (ADC)
- (England) June 1976: Chancellor of the University of Surrey
- 1990: Royal Fellow of the Royal Society (FRS)
- Honorary Freeman of the Worshipful Society of Apothecaries
- Honorary Freeman of the Worshipful Company of Clothworkers
- Honorary Liveryman of the Worshipful Company of Engineers
- Liveryman of the Mercers' Company
- Honorary Freeman of the Worshipful Company of Musicians
- Liveryman of the Worshipful Company of Salters
- 2025: Wigmore Hall Medal

==== Wear of orders, decorations, and medals ====
The ribbons worn regularly by Edward in undress uniform are as follows:

Ribbons of the Duke of Kent

| Grand Master and First and Principal Knight Grand Cross of the Order of St Michael and St George | | Knight Grand Cross of the Royal Victorian Order | |
| United Nations Medal for the UNFICYP mission | King George VI Coronation Medal | Queen Elizabeth II Coronation Medal | Queen Elizabeth II Silver Jubilee Medal |
| Queen Elizabeth II Golden Jubilee Medal | Queen Elizabeth II Diamond Jubilee Medal | Queen Elizabeth II Platinum Jubilee Medal | King Charles III Coronation Medal |
| Army Long Service and Good Conduct Medal with three bars | Canadian Forces' Decoration with three clasps | Sierra Leone Independence Medal | Guyana Independence Medal |

With medals, Edward normally wears the breast stars of the Garter, St Michael and St George, and Royal Victorian Order. When only one should be worn, he wears the Order of the Garter star. Foreign honours are worn in accordance with British customs and traditions when applicable.

==== Military appointments ====
Canada

- (Canada) 11 June 1977: Colonel-in-Chief, of The Lorne Scots (Peel, Dufferin and Halton Regiment)

United Kingdom

- (United Kingdom) 22 October 1974 – 14 April 2024: Colonel, of the Scots Guards
- (United Kingdom) 1969 –: Colonel-in-Chief, of the Royal Regiment of Fusiliers
- (United Kingdom) Royal Colonel, 1st Battalion, of The Rifles
- (United Kingdom) 25 January 1994: Deputy Colonel-in-Chief, of the Royal Scots Dragoon Guards
- (United Kingdom) 1993 – 31 March 2015: Honorary Air Commodore, of RAF Leuchars
- (United Kingdom) 15 June 1985 – 30 June 1996: Honorary Air Vice Marshal RAF
- (United Kingdom) 1 July 1996: Honorary Air Chief Marshal RAF

=== Arms ===
Coat of arms of the Duke of Kent
| Notes As a descendant of George V, the Duke of Kent's arms are based on the Royal Arms. Coronet Coronet of a Grandchild of the Sovereign Crest On the coronet of children of other sons of the Sovereign, composed of four crosses-patées alternated with four strawberry leaves a lion statant guardant or, crowned with the like coronet and differenced with a label as in the Arms. Escutcheon The Royal Arms differenced by a label of five points argent the points charged alternately with three anchors azure and two crosses gules. Supporters The Royal Supporters differenced with the like coronet and label. Orders The Order of the Garter ribbon. HONI SOIT QUI MAL Y PENSE (Shame be to him who thinks evil of it) Banner The Royal Standard of the United Kingdom labelled for difference as in his arms. (in Scotland) Symbolism As with the Royal Arms of the United Kingdom. The first and fourth quarters are the arms of England, the second of Scotland, the third of Ireland. |

== Issue ==
| Name | Birth | Death | Marriage | | Children |
|---|---|---|---|---|---|
| George Windsor, Earl of St Andrews | 26 June 1962 | | 9 January 1988 | Sylvana Tomaselli | Edward Windsor, Lord Downpatrick; Lady Marina Windsor; Lady Amelia Windsor |
| Lady Helen Taylor | 28 April 1964 | | 18 July 1992 | Timothy Taylor | Columbus Taylor; Cassius Taylor; Eloise Taylor; Estella Taylor |
| Lord Nicholas Windsor | 25 July 1970 | | 4 November 2006 | Paola Doimi de Lupis de Frankopan | Albert Windsor; Leopold Windsor; Louis Windsor |
| Lord Patrick Windsor (stillborn) | 5 October 1977 | | None | | |

== Bibliography ==
=== Books ===
- HRH The Duke of Kent; Vickers, Hugo (2022). A Royal Life. Hodder & Stoughton. ISBN 978-1529389708.

=== Authored articles and letters ===
- HRH The Duke of Kent (21 September 2020). "His Royal Highness The Duke of Kent marks Blood Cancer Awareness Month". Blood Cancer UK.

== Notes ==
Prince Edward, Duke of Kent House of Windsor Born: 9 October 1935
Lines of succession
| Preceded by Rufus Gilman | Succession to the British throne son of Prince George, Duke of Kent grandson of George V | Followed by Earl of St Andrews |
Peerage of the United Kingdom
| Preceded by The Prince George | Duke of Kent; 2nd creation 1942–present | Incumbent; Heir-apparent: George Windsor, Earl of St Andrews |
Academic offices
| Preceded by The Lord Robens of Woldingham | Chancellor of the University of Surrey; 1976–present | Incumbent |
Orders of precedence in the United Kingdom
| Preceded by The Duke of Gloucester | Gentlemen; HRH The Duke of Kent | Succeeded by The Earl of Snowdon |
Cultural offices
| Preceded by Aubrey Buxton | President of the Royal Television Society; 1977–1979 | Succeeded by Huw Wheldon |
Masonic offices
| Preceded by The Earl of Scarbrough | Grand Master of the United Grand Lodge of England; 1967–present | Incumbent |
Honorary titles
| Preceded by The Earl Alexander of Tunis | Grand Master of the Order of St Michael and St George; 1967–present | Incumbent |
Sporting positions
| Preceded by Princess Marina, Duchess of Kent | President of the All England Lawn Tennis and Croquet Club; 1969–2021 | Vacant |
| Preceded by The Earl of Harewood | President of The Football Association; 1971–2000 | Succeeded by The Duke of York |
