= Coppins =

Country house in Buckinghamshire, England

Coordinates: 51.526°N 0.509°W

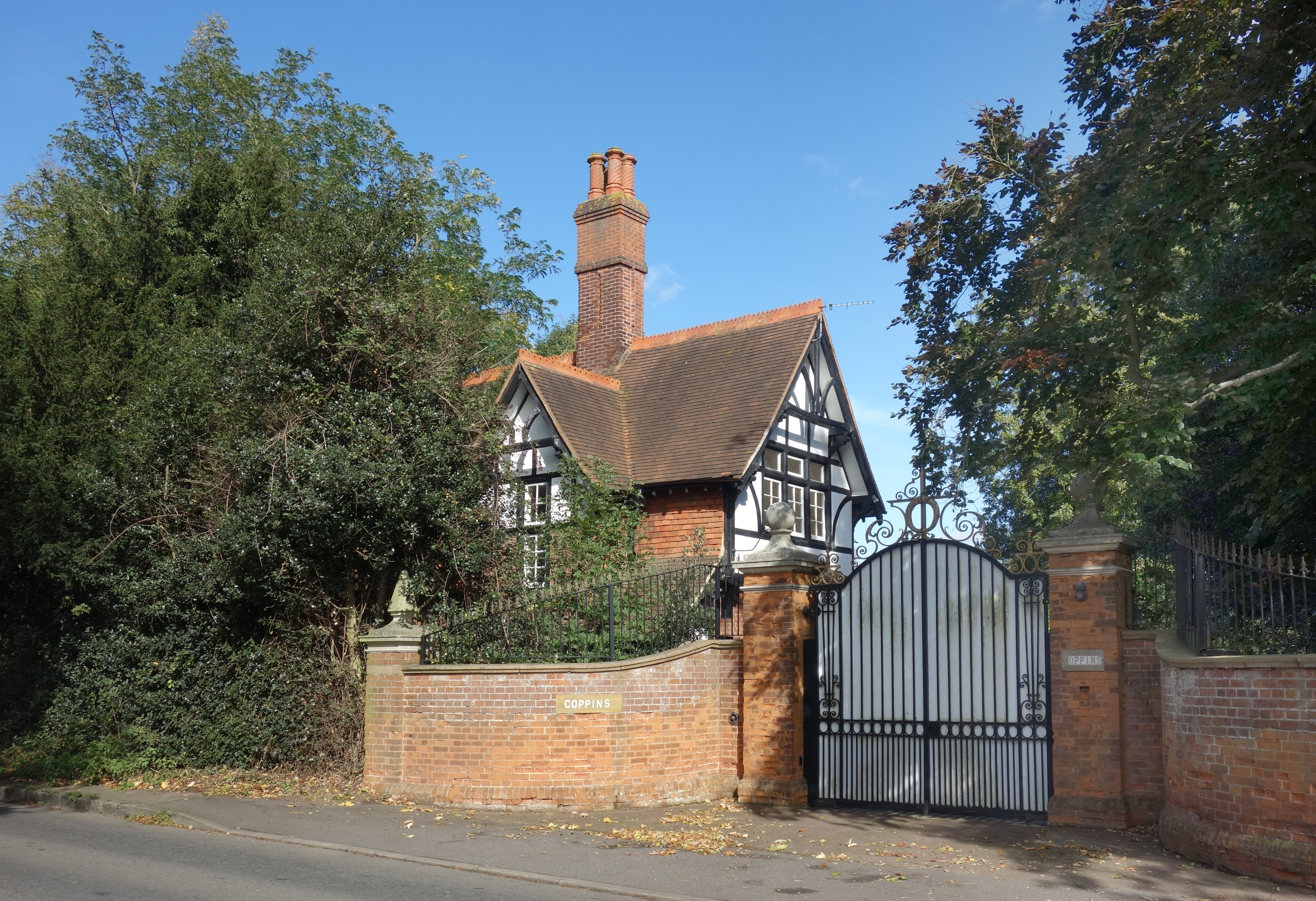
The entrance to Coppins in 2017

Coppins is a country house north of the village of Iver in Buckinghamshire, England. Located only seven miles from Windsor Castle, it was formerly a home to many members of the British royal family, including Princess Victoria, Prince George, Duke of Kent and Princess Marina, and their son Prince Edward, Duke of Kent.

== History ==
The house was originally a mid-nineteenth-century farmhouse built by John Mitchell, who arranged theatre visits for Queen Victoria and her son, the Prince of Wales. The house was substantially altered for Princess Victoria, who moved there after the death of her mother, Queen Alexandra, in 1925.

Princess Victoria left Coppins to her nephew Prince George, Duke of Kent, when she died in 1935. The home to two generations of the Kent family was eventually sold.

Prince Philip, Duke of Edinburgh was a regular visitor to Coppins during school holidays while at Gordonstoun (1937–39) and Dartmouth Naval College (1939–40), and later when visiting with Princess Elizabeth. Prince George's wife, Princess Marina, was Prince Philip's paternal first cousin.

Prince Michael of Kent was born there on 4 July 1942. In 1944, Princess Marina's first cousin King George II of Greece also stayed at Coppins. Coppins was sold by Prince Edward in 1972 with 236 acres of land to Commander Eli Gottlieb for an amount that was reported to be over £400,000. Coppins was put up for sale again in April 1977 for £500,000, with 13 acres of gardens.
