= Lord Nicholas Windsor =

Younger son of Prince Edward, Duke of Kent

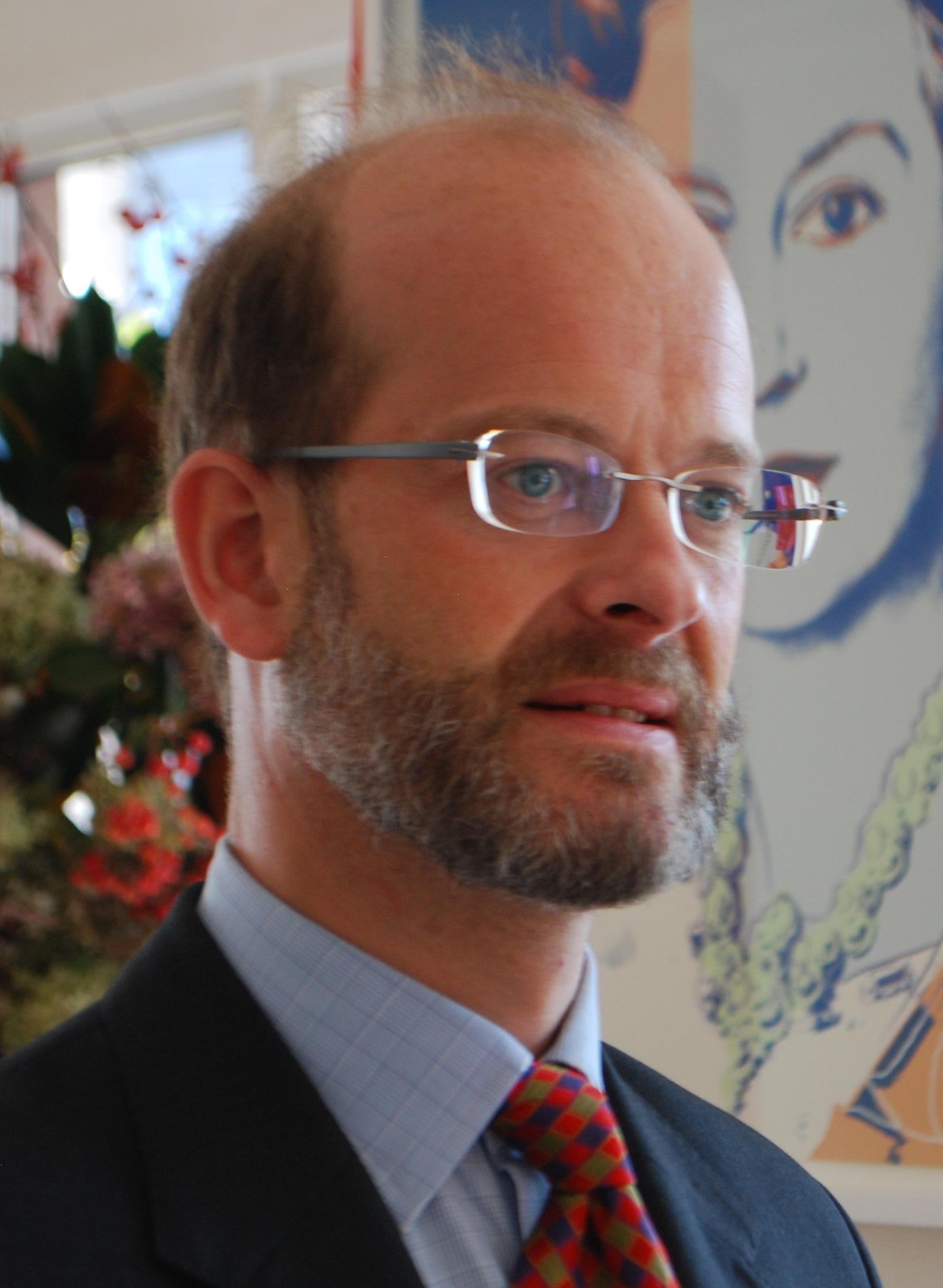
- Windsor in 2013
- Born: 25 July 1970 (age 56); Denmark Hill, London, England
- Education: Harris Manchester College, Oxford
- Spouse: Paola Doimi de Lupis Frankopan (m. 2006; sep. 2025)
- Children: 3
- Parents: Prince Edward, Duke of Kent (father); Katharine Worsley (mother)
- Relatives: House of Windsor

Lord Nicholas Charles Edward Jonathan Windsor (born 25 July 1970) is a relative of the British royal family, the youngest child of Prince Edward, Duke of Kent. As a Catholic convert, he forfeited his right of succession to the throne. Lord Nicholas has voiced strong anti-abortion views.

== Early years ==
Nicholas Charles Edward Jonathan Windsor was born on 25 July 1970 at King's College Hospital in Denmark Hill, London, to Prince Edward, Duke of Kent and Katharine, Duchess of Kent. He has an older brother, Earl of St Andrews, and a sister, Lady Helen Taylor. He was baptised later that year at Windsor Castle. His godparents included his paternal second cousin Charles, Prince of Wales (later King Charles III), and Donald Coggan, at the time Archbishop of York and later Archbishop of Canterbury.

== Religion ==
Nicholas's mother, the Duchess of Kent, had been received into the Catholic Church in 1994. He converted to Catholicism in 2001.

On 14 July 2011, Nicholas became an Honorary Vice-president of the Friends of the Personal Ordinariate of Our Lady of Walsingham, an Anglican Ordinariate within the Catholic Church.

Nicholas is also a patron of the Society of King Charles the Martyr and, though it is a largely Anglican society, he identifies it with his Catholic faith. In a passage written by Windsor for the Society's website, he extols Charles's virtues: "In the King's personal piety, devotion and support of the Church, his ecumenical understanding (far advanced for his day), his patronage of the Arts in the service of God, his inspiration of the Christian classic, Eikon Basilike and of course his martyrdom, we have much to REMEMBER and be thankful for."

Nicholas has voiced strong views on the issue of abortion, which he has stated is, as a societal threat, "worse than al-Qaeda".

== Marriage and family ==
Nicholas met his future wife, Paola Doimi de Lupis Frankopan Šubić Zrinski, at a party in New York City in 1999 to mark the Millennium. He became engaged to her in July 2006. Following a civil ceremony on 19 October 2006 in a London register office, the couple had a religious marriage on 4 November 2006 in the Church of St Stephen of the Abyssinians in Vatican City. By the marriage, the bride became Lady Nicholas Windsor. As required by the Royal Marriages Act 1772, Elizabeth II consented to the marriage. A House of Commons Early Day Motion welcomed "the first overt marriage within the rites of the Catholic Church of a member of the Royal Family since the reign of Queen Mary I, and the first marriage of a member of the Royal Family to take place within the Vatican City State". In September 2025 it was reported that the couple had separated.

Lord and Lady Nicholas have three sons, Albert, Leopold and Louis. An Early Day Motion in the House of Commons welcomed the baptism of their first son as the first royal child to be baptised a Catholic since 1688.

== Authored articles ==
- Windsor, Nicholas (10 October 2011). "The world doesn't have a right to abortion". The Telegraph. London.
- Windsor, Lord Nicholas (27 October 2011). "If we can abolish slavery, we can end abortion". Catholic Herald. Archived from the original on 8 December 2011.
