= Ebor Way =

Footpath in Yorkshire, England

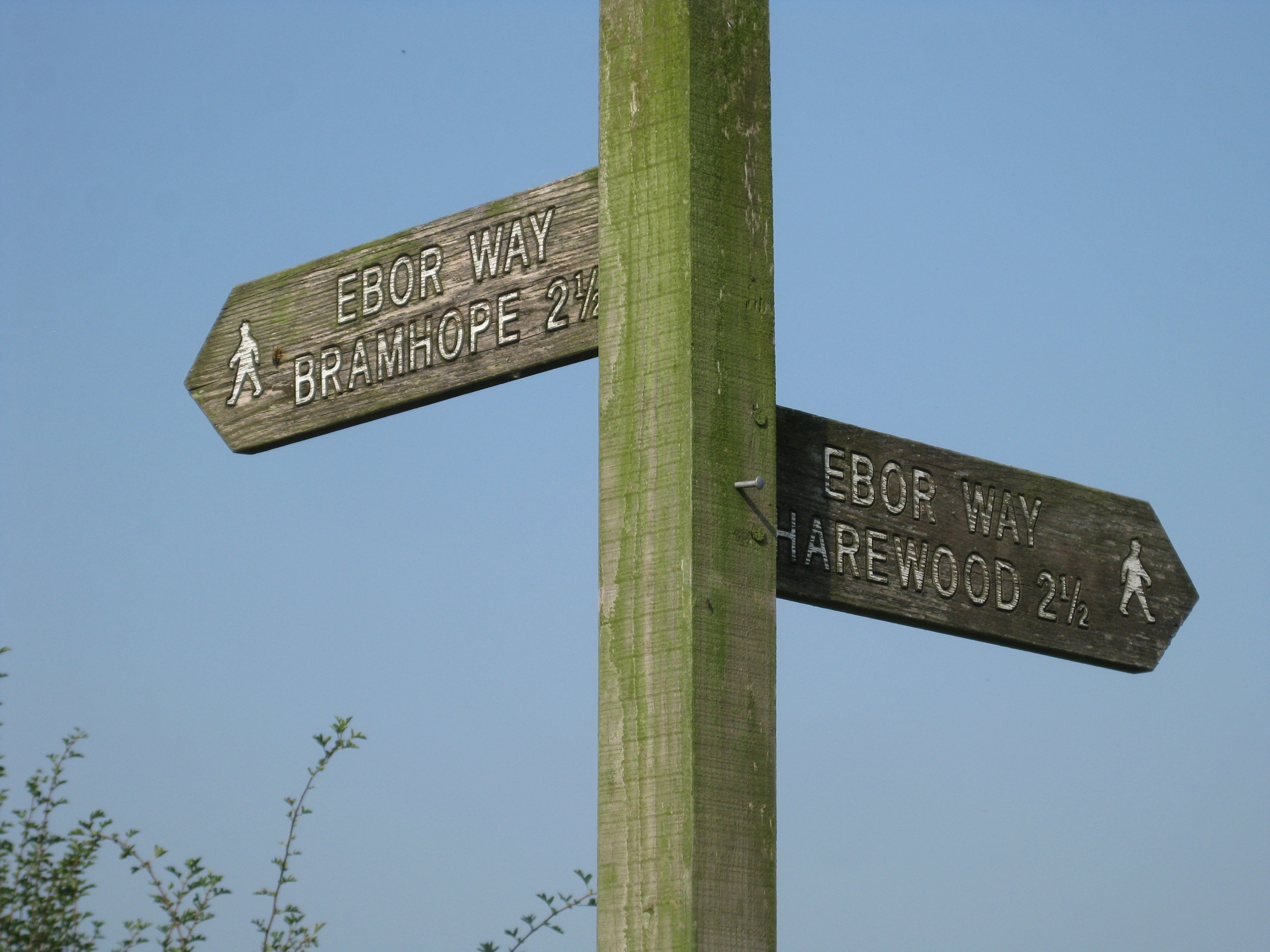
- Signpost north of Eccup, Leeds
- Length: 70 mi (110 km)
- Location: England: North Yorkshire, West Yorkshire
- Trailheads: Helmsley, North Yorkshire; 54.246°N 1.063°W; Ilkley, West Yorkshire; 53.925°N 1.823°W
- Use: Hiking

The Ebor Way is a 70-mile (112 km) long-distance footpath from Helmsley, North Yorkshire to Ilkley, West Yorkshire, via the city of York, England. It takes its name from Eboracum, the Roman name for York.

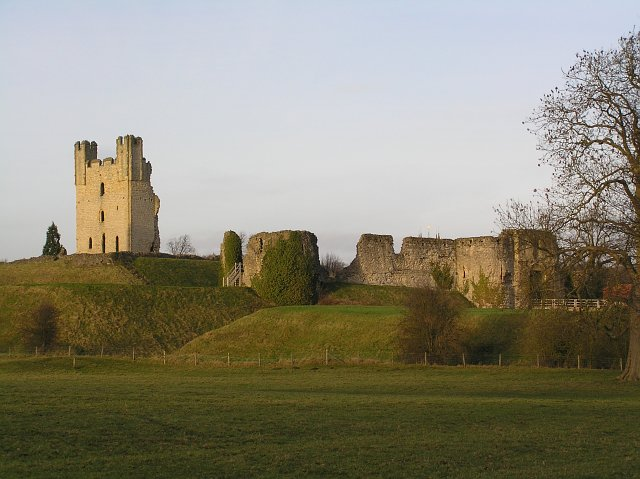
Helmsley Castle is near a trail head on the Ebor Way

This walk connects the Cleveland Way and Dales Way running across the Howardian Hills, through the low-lying vale of York and then up the Wharfe valley. It was first developed in the 1970s by the Ebor Acorn Rambling Club.

From Helmsley, the walk heads south via Oswaldkirk, Cawton and Hovingham to Terrington. Here it is joined by the Centenary Way, which follows a broadly similar route to York, although the two diverge at times. From Terrington, it continues south to Sheriff Hutton and Strensall, then runs alongside the River Foss to the centre of York. Passing York Minster, it skirts round the north and west sides of the city walls before leaving the city on the west bank of the River Ouse.

Turning west away from the river, the path goes through the satellite villages of Bishopthorpe and Copmanthorpe before picking up the route of the old Roman road between Eboracum and Calcaria. Where the route crosses the A64, walkers may be well advised to use the new bridge at Bilbrough Top and walk along the northern side of the road rather than sticking faithfully to the route, as this avoids a dangerous road crossing. The path then continues to follow the route of the Roman road into Tadcaster.

From Tadcaster, the path largely follows the banks of the River Wharfe through Boston Spa, with deviations away from the river bank through Newton Kyme and Thorp Arch. From Wetherby, the path heads south through Linton, then meanders westwards before crossing the River Wharfe, and running along the south side of it to Harewood. A few miles after passing through the grounds of Harewood House, the route is joined by the Dales Way Leeds link, and from here on they take mostly the same route with only minor variances.

The route continues through Bramhope and along the Chevin ridge before dropping into Menston, and then climbing up to Ilkley Moor for the wildest part of the route. After following the edge of the moor, the route descends via the Cow and Calf rocks, before coming to its end in the centre of Ilkley.
