= The Chevin =

Hill in West Yorkshire, United Kingdom

Coordinates: 53.89358°N 1.69107°W

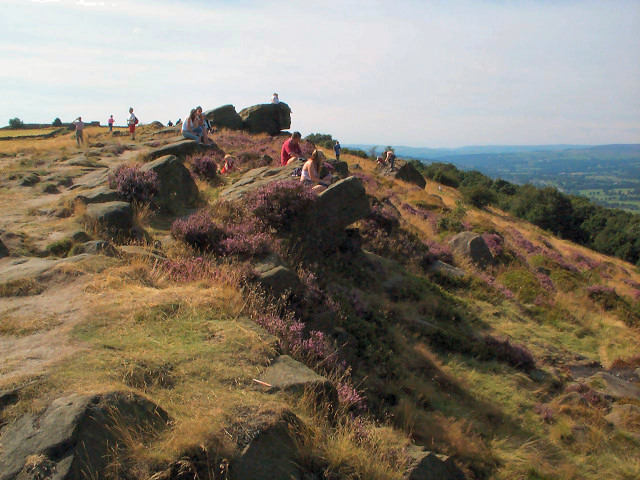
- Viewpoint near the summit of Otley Chevin

Highest point
- Elevation: 282 m (925 ft)

Geography
- Location: Wharfedale, overlooking Otley, West Yorkshire, England
- OS grid: SE204442
- Topo map: OS Landranger 104, OS Explorer 297

The Chevin overlooking Otley

The Chevin is the ridge on the south side of Wharfedale in Leeds, West Yorkshire, England, overlooking the market town of Otley, and often known as Otley Chevin.

== Etymology ==
The name is Brythonic in origin, the earliest attestation of the name in English is an eleventh-century copy of a charter from 972 which gives the spelling as Scefinc, with another charter of around 1030 records it as on Scefinge. These early spellings suggest that an originally Celtic term (related to the Modern Welsh "is y cefn", meaning below the ridge) was borrowed into English, as the initial s- likely indicates the name was preceded by a word unfamiliar to speakers of Old English.

As such, the word Chevin simply means "back", "ridge" or "ridge of high land", and shares its etymology with many other hills across western Europe, such as The Cheviot in Northumberland, Cefn Cribwr and Cefn Bryn in Glamorgan and the Cévennes in France. One of the steep hillsides of the Chevin is called the Great Dib, first attested in 1290 as Dibe. Since dib is a Middle English word for 'pool', this name probably originally referred to a pool at the foot of the slope.

== History and features ==
The Chevin is largely covered in attractive old woodland and heathland. It is a part of the Carboniferous Millstone Grit group. A Roman road ran along the top of the Chevin, part of the road that linked Eboracum (York), Calcaria (Tadcaster) and Olicana (Ilkley), perhaps on the same route as the modern road, Yorkgate, or perhaps about 800 metres (2,600 ft) to the south.

The highest point of the Chevin is often thought to be Surprise View, however it is in fact Beacon Hill next to Yorkgate quarry which reaches 283 metres (928 ft) at grid reference SE199441 and used to be the site of a trig point. Surprise View is the more visited summit of the Chevin and offers extensive views of Otley and Wharfedale, and has an adjacent car park. It is the site of a cross erected every Easter since 1969.

Parts of the Chevin, known as the Danefield Estate, belonged to landowner Walter Fawkes and his descendants. After World War II these areas were donated to Otley Urban District Council as a memorial to those from the Wharfe Valley who had lost their lives during the war.

== Recreation ==
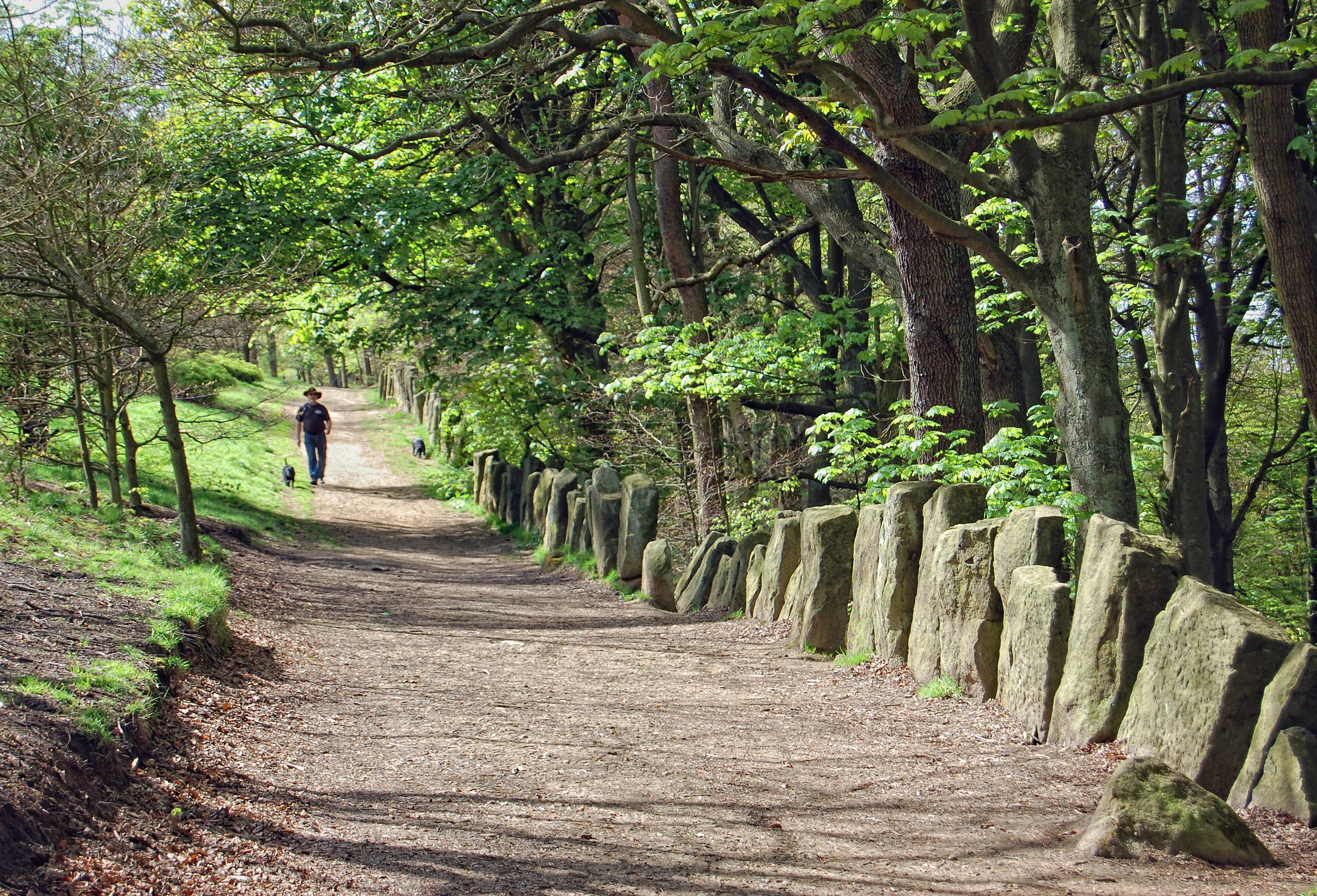
A megalithic stone boundary on the Chevin below Surprise View

Several outcrops of rock are distributed across the upper slopes of the Chevin and are popular for climbing and bouldering. The Chevin also has a number of footpaths and bridlepaths, and is popular with walkers, runners and riders. It is crossed by the Leeds link to the Dales Way, and the Ebor Way. There is also an Orienteering course in the forest park, with maps available from the local tourist office. Chevin Forest parkrun takes place at 9am every Saturday morning - it is a free, weekly, timed, 5 km run, organised by local volunteers. As a recreational area, the Chevin is divided in two by the East Chevin Road.

== The Chevin in art ==
The famous painting Snow Storm: Hannibal and His Army Crossing the Alps by J. M. W. Turner which hangs in the Tate Gallery, is reputed to have been inspired by a view of the Chevin with a stormy background sky. Turner used to stay with his friend Walter Fawkes at Farnley Hall on the opposite side of the valley to the Chevin. Recalling a day in the autumn of 1810 Fawkes' son, Hawkesworth, remembered a storm that inspired one of Turner's major paintings:

"Hawkey! Hawkey! Come here! Come here! Look at this thunder-storm. Isn't it grand? isn't it wonderful? – isn't it sublime?" All this time he was making notes of its form and colour on the back of a letter. I proposed some better drawing-block, but he said it did very well. He was absorbed – he was entranced. There was the storm rolling and sweeping and shafting out its lightning over the Yorkshire hills. Presently the storm passed and he finished. "There Hawkey," said he, "In two years you will see this again, and call it Hannibal Crossing the Alps."

Otley indie rock band The Chevin take their name from the hill.
