= Hovingham =

Village and civil parish in North Yorkshire, England

Coordinates: 54°10′21″N 0°58′46″W

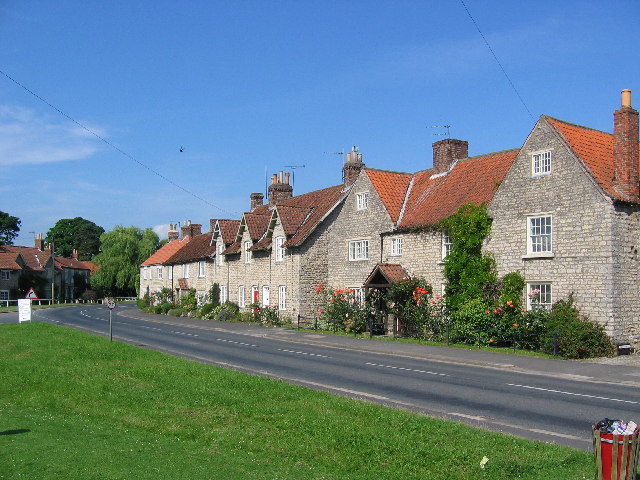
- Hovingham

- Location within North Yorkshire
- Population: 362 (2011 census)
- OS grid reference: SE667528
- Unitary authority: North Yorkshire
- Ceremonial county: North Yorkshire
- Region: Yorkshire and the Humber
- Country: England
- Sovereign state: United Kingdom
- Post town: YORK
- Postcode district: YO62
- Police: North Yorkshire
- Fire: North Yorkshire
- Ambulance: Yorkshire
- UK Parliament: Thirsk and Malton

Hovingham is a large village and civil parish in North Yorkshire, England. It is on the edge of the Howardian Hills and about 7 miles (11 km) south of Kirkbymoorside.

== History ==
The name 'Hovingham' is first attested in the Domesday Book of 1086, where it appears as Hovingham. The settlement lay within the Maneshou hundred. The lands at the time of the Norman invasion belonged to Orm, son of Gamal. After the invasion, the lands were granted to Hugh, son of Baldric. The name 'Hovingham' means 'the village of Hofa's people'.

There is evidence of Roman activity around the village which sat on the Malton to Aldburgh road in those times. During the construction of Hovingham Hall gardens, a Roman bath, tesselated pavement and other artefacts were uncovered.

The village had a station on the Thirsk and Malton branch of the North Eastern Railway.

== Governance ==
The village is within the Thirsk and Malton UK Parliament constituency. It is also part of the Hovingham & Sheriff Hutton electoral division of North Yorkshire Council. The local Parish Council is a joint one with nearby Scackleton and the council has seven members including the Chair.

An electoral ward in the same name exists. This ward stretches south to Terrington with a total population taken at the 2011 Census of 1,656.

From 1974 to 2023, it was part of the district of Ryedale.

== Geography ==
The 1881 UK Census recorded the population as 600. According to the 2001 UK Census, the population was 371, of which 300 were over sixteen years old and 174 of those were in employment. There were 166 dwellings, of which 59 were detached. The population at the 2011 Census had marginally reduced to 362.

The nearest settlements are Slingsby 1.75 miles (2.82 km) to the east; Stonegrave 1.6 miles (2.6 km) to the north; Cawton 1.9 miles (3.1 km) to the north-west; Coulton 2.2 miles (3.5 km) to the west south-west and Scackleton 2.1 miles (3.4 km) to the south-west. The village lies at an elevation of 215 feet (66 m) at its highest point and is on the B1257 Malton to Stokesley road. Marrs Beck flows northwards through the village to eventually join the River Rye near Butterwick and Brawby.

Limestone is quarried in Wath about 0.6 mi (1 km) east of Hovingham.

== Education ==
There was one school in the village, Hovingham Church of England Voluntary Controlled Primary School, built by Lady Worsley in 1864 and extended in 1888. It is a Grade II Listed Building. The school lies within the catchment area of Malton School for secondary education.

== Village services ==
The village is served by the bus route to Malton only. There is a village shop as well as a bakery and tea room, a hotel, a public house and other local businesses. A farmers' market is held on the first Saturday of each month.

== Sports ==
Hovingham Cricket Club run teams at many level, with the Senior team competing in the York & District Cricket League. The village also runs a Tennis Club.

== Notable buildings ==
Hovingham has been home to the Worsley family since 1563 and was the childhood home of the late Duchess of Kent. The sixth Thomas Worsley (1710–1778) designed and built the current Hovingham Hall. A unique feature of the Grade I listed building is that it is entered through a covered Riding School, once used for training horses.

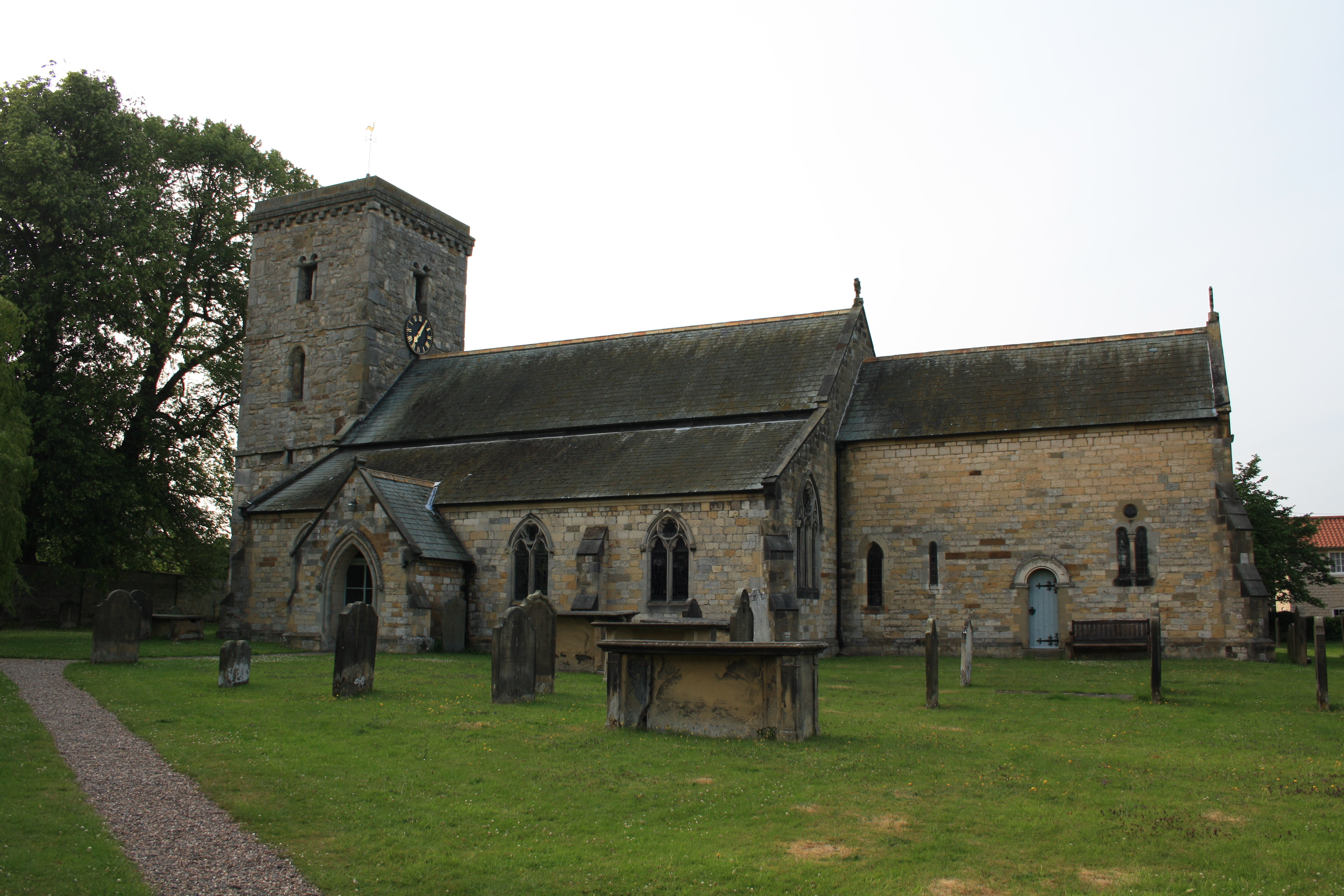
Hovingham, All Saints' Church

All Saints' Church, Hovingham is Grade II* listed. The majority of the present church building dates back to 1860, when it was rebuilt at the expense of Marcus Worsley. The tower of the parish church is of Saxon origin. An interesting feature is the large 10th-century altar cross.

There is also a Methodist church in the village, which is a Grade II Listed Building. In addition to the Hall, the school and the two churches, there are a total of 49 other listed buildings in the area.

== Music ==
The Hovingham Festival was founded by local clergyman Canon Thomas Percy Hudson in 1887. He persuaded the Worsley family to make their eighteenth-century riding school at Hovingham Hall available for a rural Yorkshire music festival that included leading professional musicians - including Joseph Joachim - supplementing the choirs and orchestras with local amateurs to make the cost of putting on ambitious works affordable. The repertoire was ambitious, including works (alongside the classics) by contemporary British composers - Elgar, Alan Gray, Parry, Somervell, Stanford and William Sterndale Bennett, and choral works by women composers such as Laura Wilson Barker (also known as Mrs Tom Taylor) and Alexandra Thomson. Thirteen festivals were held until 1906. The event was revived after 45 years during the 1950s.

The Ryedale Festival, founded in 1981, uses Hovingham Hall as one of its concert venues.

== Gallery ==
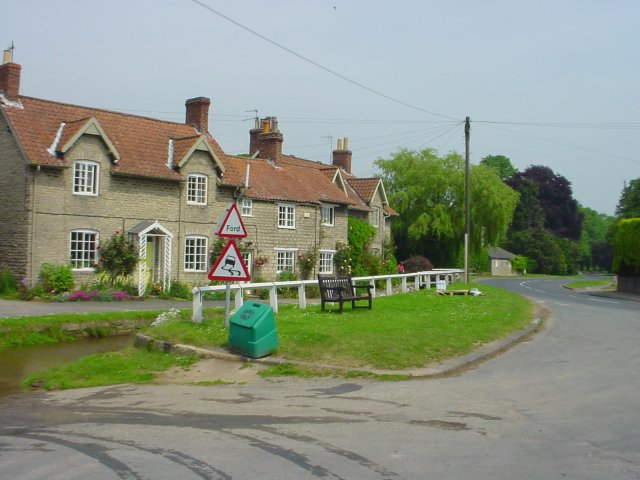
Hovingham ford

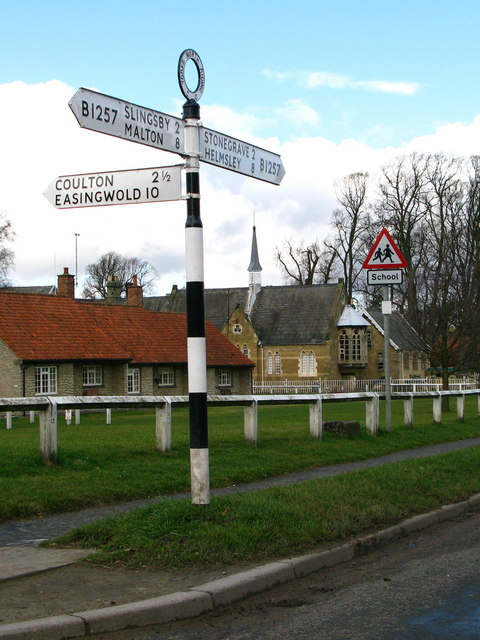
Signpost near School in centre of Hovingham

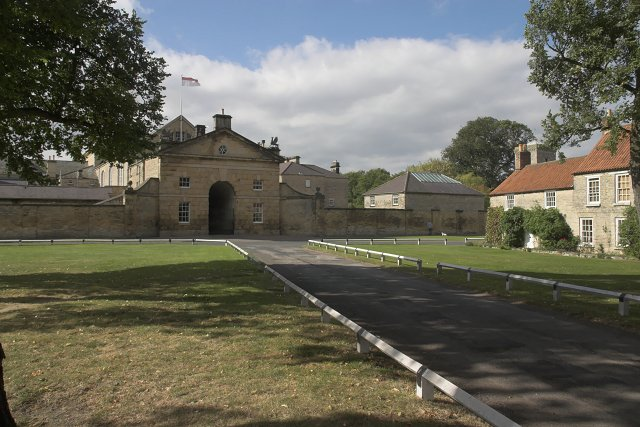
Hovingham Hall

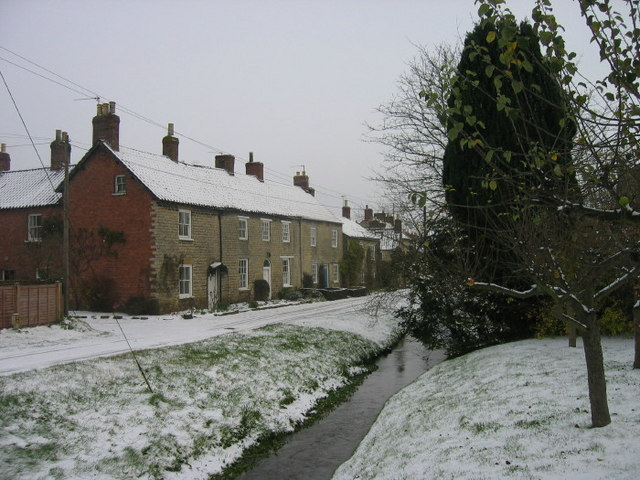
Marrs Beck, Hovingham

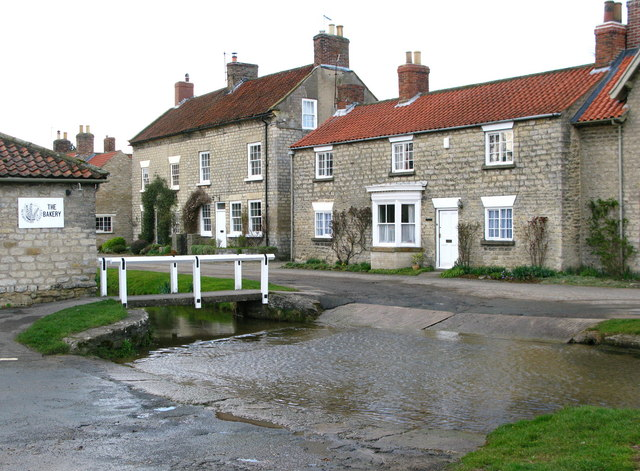
View of Brookside from the ford through Marrs Beck
