= St George the Martyr's Church, Scackleton =

Church in Scackleton, North Yorkshire, England

Coordinates: 54.1457°N 1.0069°W

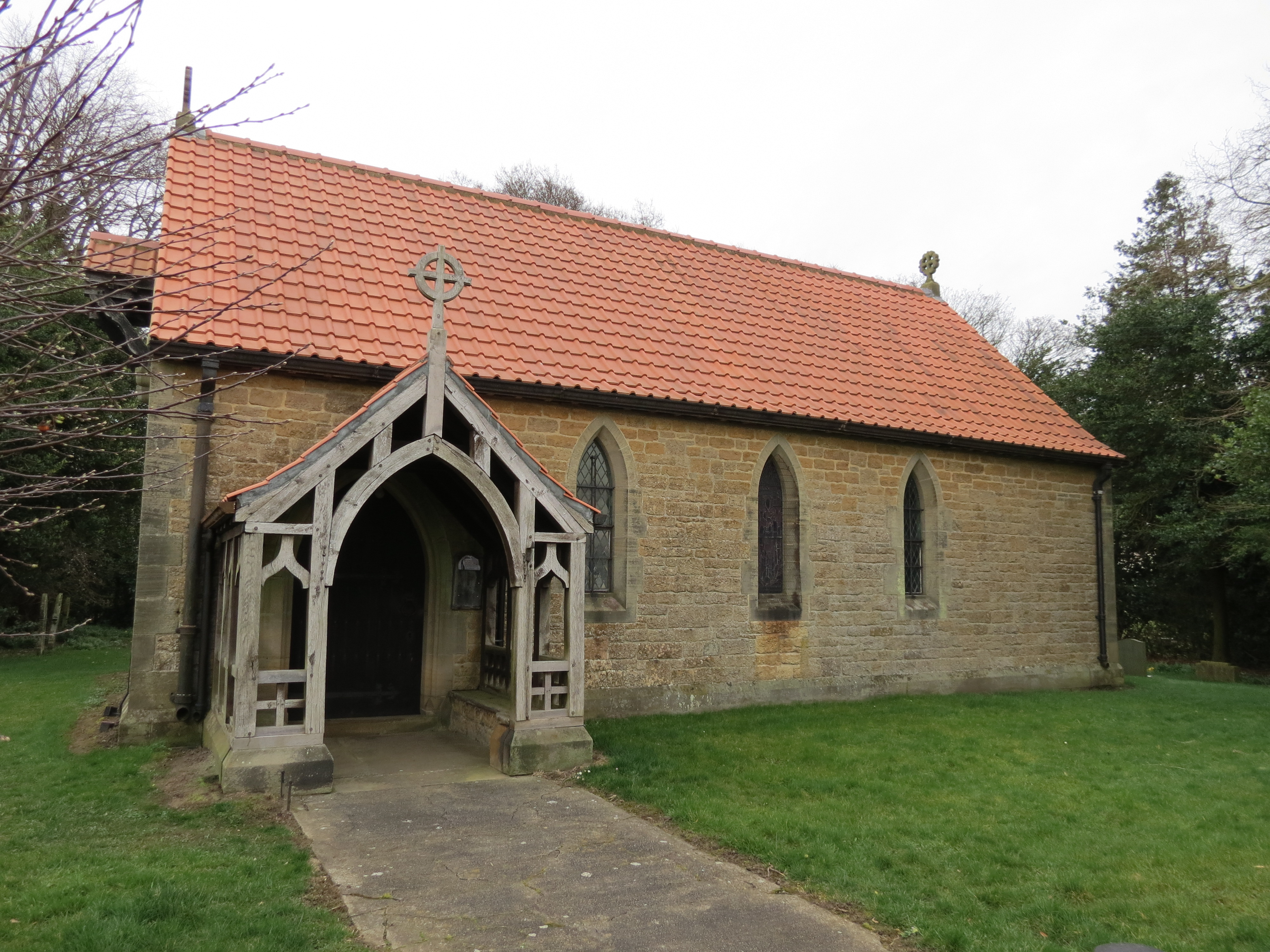
The church, in 2014

St George the Martyr's Church is an Anglican church in Scackleton, a village in North Yorkshire, in England.

Scackleton lies in the parish of All Saints' Church, Hovingham. In 1910, a church was constructed in the village. The church was not licensed for weddings, and marriages conducted under special licence were held only in 1997 and 2013.

The church is built of stone, with a tiled roof. It has a continuous nave and chancel, lit by narrow, pointed windows, and an oak porch on a stone base. Inside, there is a pine chancel screen, a bell supported by oak brackets in the middle of the west wall, and a font, brought from St Peter's Church, Dalby.
