= Listed buildings in Hovingham =

Hovingham is a civil parish in the county of North Yorkshire, England. It contains 54 listed buildings that are recorded in the National Heritage List for England. Of these, one is listed at Grade I, the highest of the three grades, one is at Grade II*, the middle grade, and the others are at Grade II, the lowest grade. The parish contains the village of Hovingham and the surrounding area. Most of the listed buildings are houses, cottages and associated structures. The others include churches and items in a churchyard, a folly in the form of a temple, a bridge, farmhouses and farm buildings, a, hotel and coach house, a school and master's house, a war memorial and a telephone kiosk.

== Key ==
Grade	Criteria
I	Buildings of exceptional interest, sometimes considered to be internationally important
II*	Particularly important buildings of more than special interest
II	Buildings of national importance and special interest

== Buildings ==
Name and location	Photograph	Date	Notes	Grade
All Saints' Church; 54.17305°N 0.98035°W		11th century	The oldest part of the church is the tower, the body of the church, incorporating earlier features, was built in 1860, and designed by Rohde Hawkins. It is built in limestone with a Westmorland slate roof, and consists of a nave, north and south aisles, a south porch, a chancel with a north vestry, and a west tower. The tower has three stages, and contains a round-arched west doorway with free-standing shafts and four orders. Above are string courses, a 9th-century carved cross, a round-headed window and slit windows in the middle stage, and above are narrow double bell openings, a 10th-century wheel cross, an east clock face, and a corbel table. The south doorway is Norman, with two orders, and in the south wall of the chancel is a re-set round-arched doorway.	II*
Pigeoncote north of Hovingham Hall; 54.17334°N 0.98135°W		17th century	The pigeoncote, later converted into a summerhouse, is in limestone with a pyramidal Welsh slate roof. It contains a tripartite window under an elliptical arch, and on the roof is a rectangular lantern with a weathervane.	II
Manor Farmhouse; 54.17350°N 0.97846°W		Mid to late 17th century	The house is in limestone with sprocketed eaves and a pantile roof. There are two storeys and attics, a middle range of two bays, and flanking gabled cross-wings. On the front is a timber porch, and the windows are sashes, one horizontally-sliding. Inside there is an inglenook fireplace with a massive bressummer.	II
Wicket Gate Cottage and Sunnyside; 54.17312°N 0.97851°W	—	Early 18th century	A house divided into two, in limestone with a pantile roof. There are two storeys and attics, and a front of two bays. On the front are sash window, with flat stone arches in the ground floor and wooden lintels above, and to the right is a blocked doorway. The entrances are on the sides.	II
Lumley House; 54.17075°N 0.97883°W	—	Early to mid 18th century	The house is in limestone with a pantile roof. There are two storeys and four bays. On the front is a timber porch, and the windows are sashes, some horizontally-sliding.	II
Tuscan Temple; 54.16927°N 0.99333°W	—	1748	The folly, in the form of a temple, is in Temple Bank Wood. It is in limestone, and consists of a prostyle temple with a tetrastyle portico, a plain entablature and a pediment.	II
Mausoleum; 54.17321°N 0.98028°W	—	c. 1750	The mausoleum is in the churchyard of All Saints' Church to the north of the church. It is in sandstone and has a pyramidal stone slate roof with a finial, The mausoleum has a square plan with a porch to the south, and is semi-subterranean. Steps lead down to a gabled porch containing a Chi Rho symbol, and on each side is a small unglazed rectangular opening.	II
Oldfields; 54.17392°N 0.97962°W	—	Mid 18th century	A house in two parts with a later mason's shop to the right, in limestone with pantile roofs. The left part of the house has a single storey and an attic, and one bay. It contains a doorway with a bow window to the right and a casement window in a gablet above. The right part has two storeys and one bay, and it contains sash windows, the window in the ground floor with a tooled wedge lintel, and behind both parts is a continuous outshut. The mason's shop has one storey, and contains a garage door, and a horizontally-sliding sash window in a gablet above.	II
Pelican Cottage; 54.17394°N 0.97969°W	—	Mid 18th century	The house is in limestone with a pantile roof, and the gable end facing the street. There are two storeys and two bays, and a rear outshut. The doorway is in the left bay, and the windows are horizontally-sliding sashes.	II
Wall to east and north of Hovingham Hall; 54.17299°N 0.98122°W	—	Mid 18th century	The wall enclosing the garden to the east and north of the hall is in sandstone and about 3 metres (9.8 ft) high. It has flat buttresses and coping stones.	II
Hovingham Hall; 54.17238°N 0.98053°W		1751–78	A country house in limestone with a Westmorland slate roof and an L-shaped plan. The garden front is symmetrical, with two storeys, a basement and attics. The middle three bays project under a pediment containing an oculus. This is flanked by three-bay wings, outside which are projecting three-bay pavilions with pediments containing Diocletian windows.	I
Hall Green Cottage and stables 54.17259°N 0.97981°W	—	Mid to late 18th century	Two cottages combined into one house, with a rear cross-wing, and stables to the right, in limestone with pantile roofs. The left block has two storeys and two bays, to the right is a taller block with two storeys and two bays, and further to the right are single-storey stables. The doorway is in the centre of the main block, and the windows in all parts are sashes with flat brick arches.	II
The Cottage; 54.17150°N 0.98103°W	—	Mid to late 18th century	The house is in sandstone with quoins and an overhanging Welsh slate roof. There are two storeys, three bays, a single-storey service wing to the right, and a rear cross-wing. The central doorway and the windows, which are sashes, have wedge lintels with keystones.	II
Worsley Arms Farmhouse and cottage 54.17094°N 0.97874°W		Mid to late 18th century	The house and cottage are in one block, with an extension to the right, and are in limestone with pantile roofs. The main block has two storeys and an attic, and three bays. On the front are two doorways with divided fanlights, the right with a gabled porch, and sash windows with flat stone arches. The extension has a single storey, and contains horizontally-sliding sashes.	II
Ornamental bridge 54.17160°N 0.99010°W		1766	The bridge carries a track over a stream by a waterfall in Hoveringham Park. It is in limestone, and consists of three arches, with double outer arches and keystones. The bridge has a ramped and coped parapet, and a central balustrade.	II
Beck Cottage; 54.17355°N 0.97983°W		Late 18th century	The house is in limestone with a Welsh slate roof. There are two storeys and two bays. The doorway is in the left bay, and the windows are sashes. All the openings have wedge lintels, and those in the ground floor also have keystones.	II
Bramcote; 54.17114°N 0.98050°W	—	Late 18th century	A farm manager's house, it is in limestone with a pantile roof. There are two storeys and an attic, three bays, and a rear outshut and conservatory. On the front are two doorways with divided fanlights, and the windows are sashes, some horizontally-sliding. All the openings on the front have flat arches formed by voussoirs.	II
Bridge Cottage; 54.17388°N 0.97991°W	—	Late 18th century	The house is in limestone with a pantile roof. There are two storeys and two bays. The doorway is in the left bay, and the windows are sashes, the window to the right of the doorway horizontally-sliding. All the openings have timber lintels.	II
Brook House; 54.17362°N 0.97982°W	—	Late 18th century	Two houses, later combined, in limestone with a Welsh slate roof. There are two storeys and an attic, and two bays. The central doorway has a divided fanlight, the windows are sashes, and all the openings have wedge lintels.	II
Drinking fountain and curved wall 54.17147°N 0.98137°W		Late 18th century	The wall is in limestone and is coped, it has a semicircular plan, and is about 1.25 metres (4 ft 1 in) high. In the centre is a plaque containing a carved head with an outlet pipe forming a mouth in the centre. At the ends are square buttresses with Tuscan pilasters and ball finials.	II
Fosters; 54.17356°N 0.97910°W		Late 18th century	The house is in limestone and has an overhanging pantile roof. There are two storeys, three bays, and a single storey wing on the right. The doorway is in the centre, the windows in the main block are sashes, and all have wedge lintels. In the wing is a casement window.	II
Moor House Farmhouse; 54.15351°N 0.98662°W	—	Late 18th century	The farmhouse is in limestone, with quoins, a sill band, and a Welsh slate roof with gable coping and shaped kneelers. There is a central projecting three-storey bay flanked by single-storey bays with attics. The windows are sashes in architraves, the windows in the top floor horizontally-sliding, all flanked by blind niches. The outer bay attics each contains an oculus. Inside the farmhouse is an inglenook fireplace.	II
Barn, Moor House Farm; 54.15384°N 0.98664°W		Late 18th century	The threshing barn is in limestone, and has a pantile roof with gable coping and shaped kneelers. It contains a doorway with a quoined surround, to the right is a stable door, and there are two rows of oblong vents.	II
Cow byre, Moor House Farm; 54.15370°N 0.98637°W	—	Late 18th century	The cow byre is in limestone, and has a pantile roof with gable coping and shaped kneelers. It contains four stable doors.	II
Stables, granary and cart shed, Moor House Farm; 54.15372°N 0.98690°W	—	Late 18th century	The farm buildings are in limestone, with quoins, and roofs of stone slate and pantile with gable coping and shaped kneelers. The stable has a single storey, with an attic forming the granary above, and contains two stable doors flanked by blocked openings. On the left return are external steps to the granary doorway. The cart shed to the north is lower and contains a blocked opening under a massive cambered timber lintel.	II
Gate piers, Park Street; 54.17132°N 0.98158°W		Late 18th century	The gate piers flanking the street at the entrance to the village are in millstone grit, and are about 4 metres (13 ft) high. Each pier has side buttresses, the buttresses and columns are rusticated, and the pier is scrolled at the top, with a moulded cornice and a ball finial.	II
The Post Cottage; 54.17321°N 0.97941°W	—	Late 18th century	The house is in limestone with a pantile roof. There are two storeys, two bays and an attic. On the front is a bow window and sashes, and the doorway is in the right gable end.	II
The Post Office; 54.17276°N 0.97872°W		Late 18th century	Two cottages, later a shop and a house, in limestone with a pantile roof. There are two storeys, three bays and an attic. On the left is a shopfront, to the right are two doorways, and the windows are sashes. The openings have flat stone arches.	II
The Vicarage, piers, railings and wall 54.17140°N 0.98060°W	—	Late 18th century	The vicarage, which was extended in about 1820, is in limestone, and has a Welsh slate roof with gable coping. There are two storeys and a main range of three bays, a cross-wing on the left at the rear, and a pavilion to the rear right. The windows are sashes, most with wedge lintels and keystones. Along Park Street are cast iron railings, and square end piers with cornices and pyramidal heads. On Church Street is a coped wall about 2 metres (6 ft 7 in) high, ramped up to the gate piers.	II
Tomb to members of Stockton family 54.17293°N 0.98026°W	—	1798	The tomb is in the churchyard of All Saints' Church, to the south of the church. It is in sandstone, and about 0.75 metres (2 ft 6 in) high. In the centre is an inscribed plaque flanked by curving panels with fluted ovals and central paterae. The cover is supported on Tuscan columns, and most inscriptions are illegible.	II
10 Park Street; 54.17134°N 0.98008°W	—	Late 18th to early 19th century	The house is in limestone with a pantile roof. There are two storeys, two bays, and a rear cross-wing. The doorway in the left bay has a divided fanlight, and the windows are sashes. All the openings have flat stone arches.	II
The Corner House; 54.17391°N 0.97834°W	—	Late 18th to early 19th century	Two cottages combined into a house, it is in limestone on a brick plinth, with a pantile roof. There are two storeys and three bays. On the front are two doorways, one blocked, and the windows are casements with flat brick arches.	II
Methodist Church; 54.17348°N 0.98003°W		1815	The church is in red brick, with a floor band, a hipped pantile roof, and two storeys. On the front is a blocked doorway under an elliptical arch flanked by round-arched windows, and in the upper floor is a blocked elliptical-arched window.	II
Pasture House; 54.17475°N 0.97734°W	—	c. 1820	The house is in limestone and has a hipped Welsh slate roof. There are two storeys and three bays. The central doorway has pilasters and a divided fanlight, and the windows are sashes with wedge lintels and keystones.	II
2 Park Street; 54.17124°N 0.97951°W		Early 19th century	The house is in limestone with a pantile roof. There are two storeys, two bays, and a rear cross-wing. The doorway is in the left bay, and the windows are horizontally-sliding sashes. The ground floor openings have flat stone arches, and in the upper floor they have stone lintels.	II
4 Park Street; 54.17126°N 0.97963°W		Early 19th century	Two houses combined into one, in limestone with a pantile roof. There are two storeys, four bays and a rear outshut. To the left in the ground floor is a casement window, and the other windows are horizontally-sliding sashes. The ground floor openings have wedge lintels, and in the upper floor they have stone lintels.	II
Beckside Cottage; 54.17400°N 0.97923°W		Early 19th century	The house is in limestone, and has a pantile roof with gable coping and a shaped kneeler on the right. There are two storeys and an attic, two bays and a continuous rear outshut. The doorway has a fanlight, and the windows are sashes.	II
House east of Beckside Cottage; 54.17400°N 0.97902°W		Early 19th century	Two houses combined into one, in limestone with a pantile roof. There are two storeys and three bays. In the middle bay is a doorway and a canted bay window to the left. The other windows are horizontally-sliding sashes, and the openings have channelled wedge lintels.	II
Clifford House; 54.17129°N 0.97979°W		Early 19th century	The house is in limestone, with quoins, a moulded cornice, and a pantile roof. There are two storeys and an attic, and two bays. The round-headed doorway in the left bay has a radial fanlight and a keystone, and the windows are sashes with flat stone arches.	II
Holmside; 54.17131°N 0.97989°W	—	Early 19th century	The house is in limestone, with quoins, a moulded cornice, and a pantile roof. There are two storeys and an attic, and two bays. The round-headed doorway in the right bay has a radial fanlight and a keystone, and the windows are sashes with flat stone arches.	II
Home Cottage and the former Malt Shovel; 54.17261°N 0.97883°W		Early 19th century	A house and an inn in limestone with a Welsh slate roof. There are two storeys and four bays. Each part has a central doorway with a divided fanlight. The windows are sashes, and all the openings have flat stone arches.	II
Park House; 54.17063°N 0.98137°W	—	Early 19th century	The house is in limestone with a pantile roof. There are two storeys and three bays. At the rear is an outshut under a catslide roof, and a cross-wing. The central doorway has a fanlight, and the windows are sashes.	II
Souter's Cottage; 54.17388°N 0.98015°W	—	Early 19th century	The house is in limestone with a pantile roof. There are two storeys and three bays. The central doorway is in a semicircular arch and has a fanlight, and the windows are sashes.	II
House east of Souter's Cottage; 54.17387°N 0.98003°W	—	Early 19th century	The house is in sandstone with a pantile roof. There are two storeys and two bays. The central doorway has a divided fanlight, the windows are sashes, and the openings have timber lintels.	II
Stepping Stones; 54.17396°N 0.97934°W	—	Early 19th century	The house is in limestone, with a coved eaves course, and a pantile roof with gable coping and a shaped kneeler on the left. There are two storeys and two bays. The doorway is in the centre, the windows are sashes, and all the openings have wedge lintels.	II
Spa Villa; 54.17828°N 1.00083°W		1835	The house, designed by Ignatius Bonomi, is in limestone with a Welsh slate roof. There are two storeys, a U-shaped plan, and a front of four bays. The outer bays project as gabled cross-wings, the gables with decorative bargeboards and pendants. In the centre are French windows and a casement window to the left. In the left wing is a canted bay window, and in the right wing is a veranda with a canopy. Elsewhere, the windows are casements.	II
Coatesworth House; 54.17424°N 0.97828°W	—	Early to mid 19th century	The house is in sandstone with a pantile roof. There are two storeys, four bays, and rear cross-wings. In the second bay is a doorway with a divided fanlight under a wooden canopy, and the windows are sashes with stone lintels.	II
Worsley Arms Hotel; 54.17113°N 0.97869°W		1840	The hotel is in limestone on a plinth with a Welsh slate roof, and consists of two blocks on the front and a rear cross-wing. The left block has two storeys and five bays. It has an eaves band, and contains a doorway with a rusticated surround and an elliptical fanlight. This is flanked by narrow lights, and the windows are sashes in architraves with keystones. The right block has three storeys and three bays. It has a floor band and coved eaves, and the windows are sashes in eared surrounds with keystones.	II
Coach house, Worsley Arms Hotel; 54.17123°N 0.97821°W		c. 1840	The coach house is in limestone with a hipped Welsh slate roof. There are two storeys and two bays. On the front are double doors under an elliptical arch, a fixed window, and a doorway with a wedge lintel.	II
The Stone House; 54.17183°N 0.97863°W		1844	The house is in limestone with a Welsh slate roof. There are two storeys, three bays, the middle bay projecting slightly, and a rear cross-wing. The central doorway has pilasters and a divided fanlight, and the windows are sashes with keystones. At the rear of the main house is a datestone, and in the cross-wing are two re-set datestones.	II
Brinkburn Farmhouse; 54.17385°N 0.98026°W	—	Mid 19th century	The house is in limestone on the front and red brick elsewhere, with quoins and a pantile roof. There are two storeys and one bay. The doorway has a fanlight, and the windows are sashes.	II
Village school, master's house and railings 54.17193°N 0.97959°W		1864	The school and house are in stone with Welsh slate roofs. The school has a single storey, an open schoolroom to the east, and an extension to the north. In the centre of the main block is a three-light transomed window flanked by paired trefoil-headed windows. On the right return is an oriel window. The entrance on the left has a hood mould, over which is an inscribed plaque, and to its left is a window with a dated lintel and a half-dormer above. The house has two storeys, three bays, and an outshut on the left. It contains a bay window and trefoil-headed windows. Both buildings are surrounded by railings.	II
War memorial 54.17287°N 0.97985°W		1921	The war memorial in the churchyard of All Saints' Church is in limestone. It consists of a crocketed Latin cross on a tapering octagonal decorated shaft. This stands on an octagonal plinth on three octagonal steps. On the plinth are plaques in stone and wood with inscriptions and the names of those lost in the First World War.	II
Telephone kiosk 54.17334°N 0.97913°W		1935	The K6 type telephone kiosk on The Green was designed by Giles Gilbert Scott. Constructed in cast iron with a square plan and a dome, it has three unperforated crowns in the top panels.	II
