= Listed buildings in Coulton, North Yorkshire =

Coulton is a civil parish in the county of North Yorkshire, England. It contains three listed buildings that are recorded in the National Heritage List for England. Of these, one is listed at Grade II*, the middle of the three grades, and the others are at Grade II, the lowest grade. The parish contains the village of Coulton and the surrounding countryside, and the listed buildings consist of a watermill and associated buildings, and two houses.

== Key ==
Grade	Criteria
II*	Particularly important buildings of more than special interest
II	Buildings of national importance and special interest

== Buildings ==
Name and location	Photograph	Date	Notes	Grade
Coulton Mill, house and farm buildings 54.15486°N 1.01782°W		Medieval	The watermill and associated buildings, which have been much altered through the centuries, are in sandstone. The mill has a pantile roof, a single storey with an attic, and two bays. It contains a doorway with a step formed from a millstone, and a window. The wheelpit is parallel to the west gable in the ruins of the wheelhouse. The house to the right is rendered and has a slate roof. There are two storeys, two bays and a continuous rear outshut. The doorway is to the left, and the windows are sashes; all the openings have stuccoed wedge lintels. On the other side of the road are a barn and a cow byre, both with pantile roofs. The barn has a single storey and contains four doors and a pitching hole. The byre has two storeys and three bays, and contains doorways and windows, and in the gable end are dove holes.	II*
Manor Farm; 54.15970°N 1.02824°W	—	Early 18th century	The house is in sandstone with sprocketed eaves and a steeply pitched pantile roof. There are two storeys and three bays. The doorway has a divided fanlight, to its right are two sash windows, and the other windows are horizontally sliding sashes.	II
Bag End Cottage; 54.15955°N 1.02804°W	—	1806 or earlier	The cottage is in stone with a pantile roof. There are two storeys, two bays, a continuous rear outshut, and a single-storey outbuilding on the left. The doorway is to the left, and the windows are horizontally sliding sashes. At the eaves level is an initialled datestone. The outbuilding contains a doorway and two slit vents.	II
