= Church of All Saints, Terrington =

Anglican church in Yorkshire, England

Church of All Saints
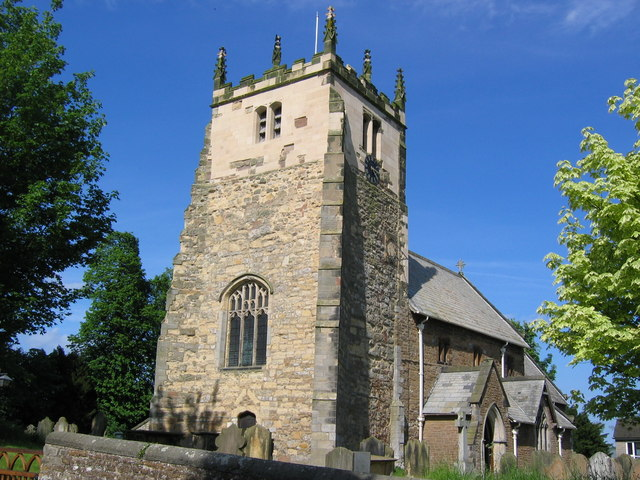
- Church of All Saints
- 54.1283°N 0.9734°W
- OS grid reference: SE671707
- Location: Terrington, North Yorkshire
- Country: England
- Denomination: Church of England
- Website: www.achurchnearyou.com/church/19049/

History
- Former name: Church of All Hallows
- Status: Parish church
- Dedication: All Saints

Architecture
- Functional status: Active

Administration
- Diocese: Diocese of York
- Archdeaconry: York
- Deanery: Southern Ryedale
- Benefice: Howardian Group
- Parish: Terrington

Listed Building – Grade I
- Designated: 25 January 1954
- Reference no.: 1315764

The Church of All Saints, is an Anglican church in the village of Terrington, North Yorkshire, England. The church, which has Saxon and Norman architecture, was grade I listed in 1954. Renovations carried out on the church in the late 19th-century revealed artifacts buried beneath the church, and an old Sanctus bell buried 7 feet (2.1 m) under the western tower.

== History ==
The tower, chancel, chapel and aisles are all Perpendicular in architecture, but a south window and south door show evidence of being Early Norman or possibly Saxon. There is no mention of a church in the Domesday Book, but a portion of the church may pre-date the Conquest so it is thought that Christian worship was taking place at Terrington before 1066. The nave was rebuilt in the 12th century and during the 14th century the chancel arch was rebuilt and a small chapel was installed on the south side of the nave. It has also been claimed that the arch through to the buttressed-tower has Saxon origins with the rest of the tower being either built, or rebuilt, sometime in the 15th century. The arches connecting the nave into the north aisle were believed to have been cut through a pre-Conquest wall, and the chantry/chapel on the south wall was cut through the wall in the 14th century.

The church was restored between 1868 and 1870 under the guidance of the Reverend Samuel Wimbush (the incumbent vicar) and Ewan Christian the architect; the south aisle was renovated and the south porch was added. The renovations revealed three different eras of architecture; Saxon, Norman and Pointed Gothic. The addition of the south aisle mirrored the north aisle and meant the Saxon wall which has herringbone masonry was moved to be an internal wall. Newer pews increased the sittings in the church from 230 to 320.

The advowson for the church was registered in part to Anetkin Mallory and his wife Sarah; they were lord and lady of Wiganthorpe, but they had quitclaimed the right by 1246 in favour of the Archbishop of York. By 1315, the church had been gifted to Robert Wodehouse by Edward II. The church used to be dedicated as the Church of All Hallows, which had changed by at least by 1835 to Church of All Saints. (Note: All Hallows was an older name for Halloween (Allhallowtide). This was the day before All Saints Day; All Saints Day has been celebrated since the 4th-century to honour the Christian martyrs.) In 1767, a sundial made by Robert Campleman was affixed to the south wall of the tower, replacing the old clock; however, a newer clock was put onto the same wall of the tower in 1876. The gnomon of the sundial was repainted in 1997, but by 2007, the sundial was declared as being in a poor condition, having a large crack along it horizontally. The 19th-century restoration also unearthed a Sanctus bell, buried some 7 feet (2.1 m) below the bottom floor of the tower. The tower is also rumoured to have once been given one of the old bells from Kirkham Abbey during the Dissolution.

In 2003, English Heritage awarded the church a grant towards the £175,000 needed to repair the church. The timber in the roof had to be raised and new lead applied to stop rainwater seeping into the structure.

Burials in the churchyard include Richard Spruce, the historian Arnold J. Toynbee, and the architect Patrick Nuttgens. Sir Jordan Metham is buried in the quire (choir) of the church itself. Between 1880 and 1900, over 200 people were buried in the churchyard, however, interments ceased in 1905 when the burial ground on Mowthorpe Lane in the village was opened.

The church was grade I listed in 1954, and the building forms part of the Terrington conservation area.

== Parish, benefice and clergy ==
The church is the parish church for Terrington, in the Benefice of the Howardian Group, in the Deanery of Southern Ryedale, which is in the Archdeaconry and Diocese of York.

Between 1455 and 1467, John Shirwood was the rector of Terrington. He later became the Bishop of Durham. The incumbent for the Howardian Group of churches which includes All Saints, is the Reverend Douglas Robertson who was appointed in 2023.

== See also ==
- Grade I listed buildings in North Yorkshire (district)
- Listed buildings in Terrington
