= Wath, Hovingham =

Hamlet in North Yorkshire, England

Coordinates: 54.1663°N 0.9641°W

Wath
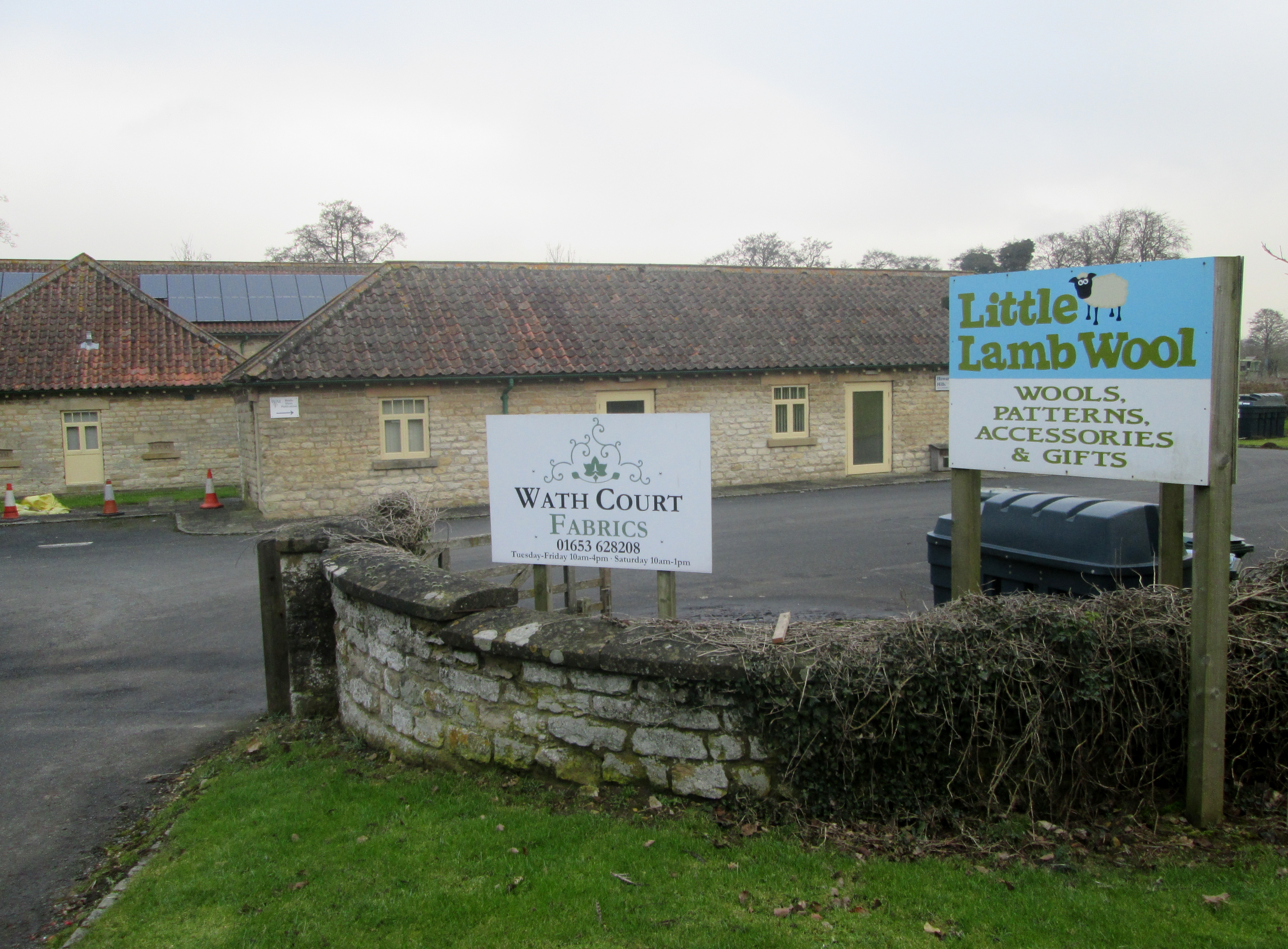

- Location within North Yorkshire
- Civil parish: Hovingham
- Unitary authority: North Yorkshire
- Ceremonial county: North Yorkshire
- Region: Yorkshire and the Humber
- Country: England
- Sovereign state: United Kingdom

Wath is a small hamlet in the civil parish of Hovingham, in North Yorkshire, England. It is situated at the northern edge of the Howardian Hills AONB, about 0.6 miles (1 km) east of Hovingham on the B1257 road which crosses here over Wath Beck. Limestone is quarried here which in the 1950s was in demand by the steel industry for lining the furnaces.

In the late 19th century there were only two houses, later just one farm. The population in 1880 was 11 persons, increasing to 20 in 1914 and decreasing to six in 1950. The area of Wath covered about 300 acres (121 ha) and included the northeastern part of Wath Wood. Wath was formerly a township in the parish of Hovingham, in 1866 Wath became a separate civil parish, on 1 April 1986 the parish was abolished and merged with Hovingham. In 1971 the parish had a population of 6. From 1974 to 2023 it was part of Ryedale district, it is now administered by the unitary North Yorkshire Council.

The farm on the northern side of the road is now used as business premises by a fabric store.

The abandoned Wath Old Quarry is an important site for the study of the stratigraphy and the fauna of the Upper Jurassic of the Cleveland Basin.

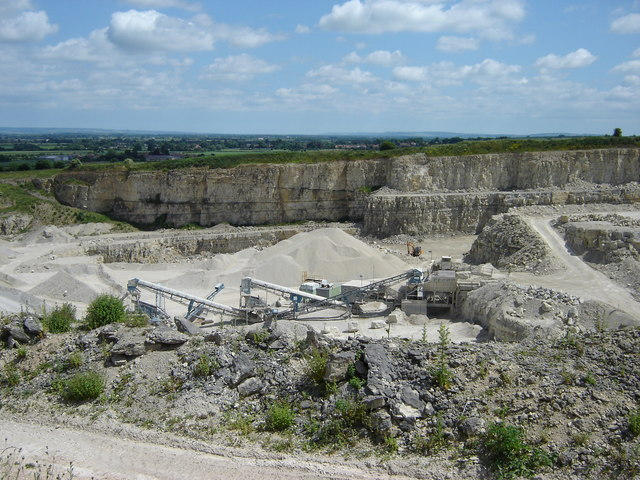
A limestone quarry near Wath

The name Wath derives from the Old Norse vað meaning 'ford'.
