= Hovingham Primary School =

School in Hovingham, North Yorkshire, England

Coordinates: 54.1720°N 0.9796°W

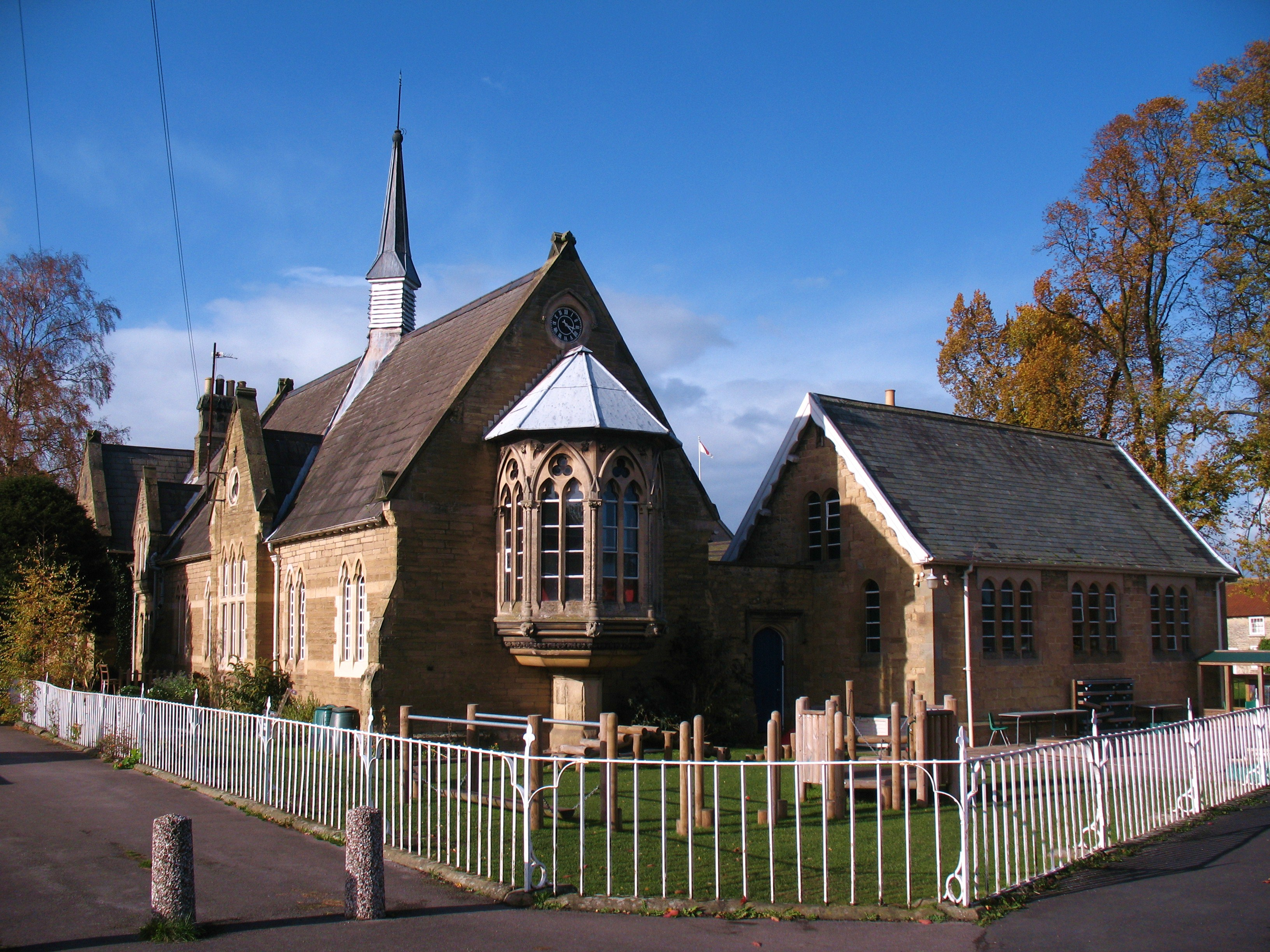
The school, in 2010

Hovingham Primary School is a former school in Hovingham, a village in North Yorkshire, in England.

The school and attached teacher's house were built in 1864. An extension was added in 1880, to provide a primary schoolroom. The building was grade II listed in 1987. By 2022, the school had no pupils and in 2023 it was closed down, against local objections. At the time, it was proposed that it would be converted to a community use.

The school and house are built of stone with Welsh slate roofs. The school has a single storey, an open schoolroom to the east, and an extension to the north. In the centre of the main block is a three-light transomed window flanked by paired trefoil-headed windows. On the right return is an oriel window. The entrance on the left has a hood mould, over which is an inscribed plaque, and to its left is a window with a dated lintel and a half-dormer above. The house has two storeys, three bays, and an outshut on the left. It contains a bay window and trefoil-headed windows. Both buildings are surrounded by railings.

== See also ==
- Listed buildings in Hovingham
