= Coulton Mill =

Listed building in North Yorkshire, England

Coordinates: 54°09′17″N 1°01′04″W

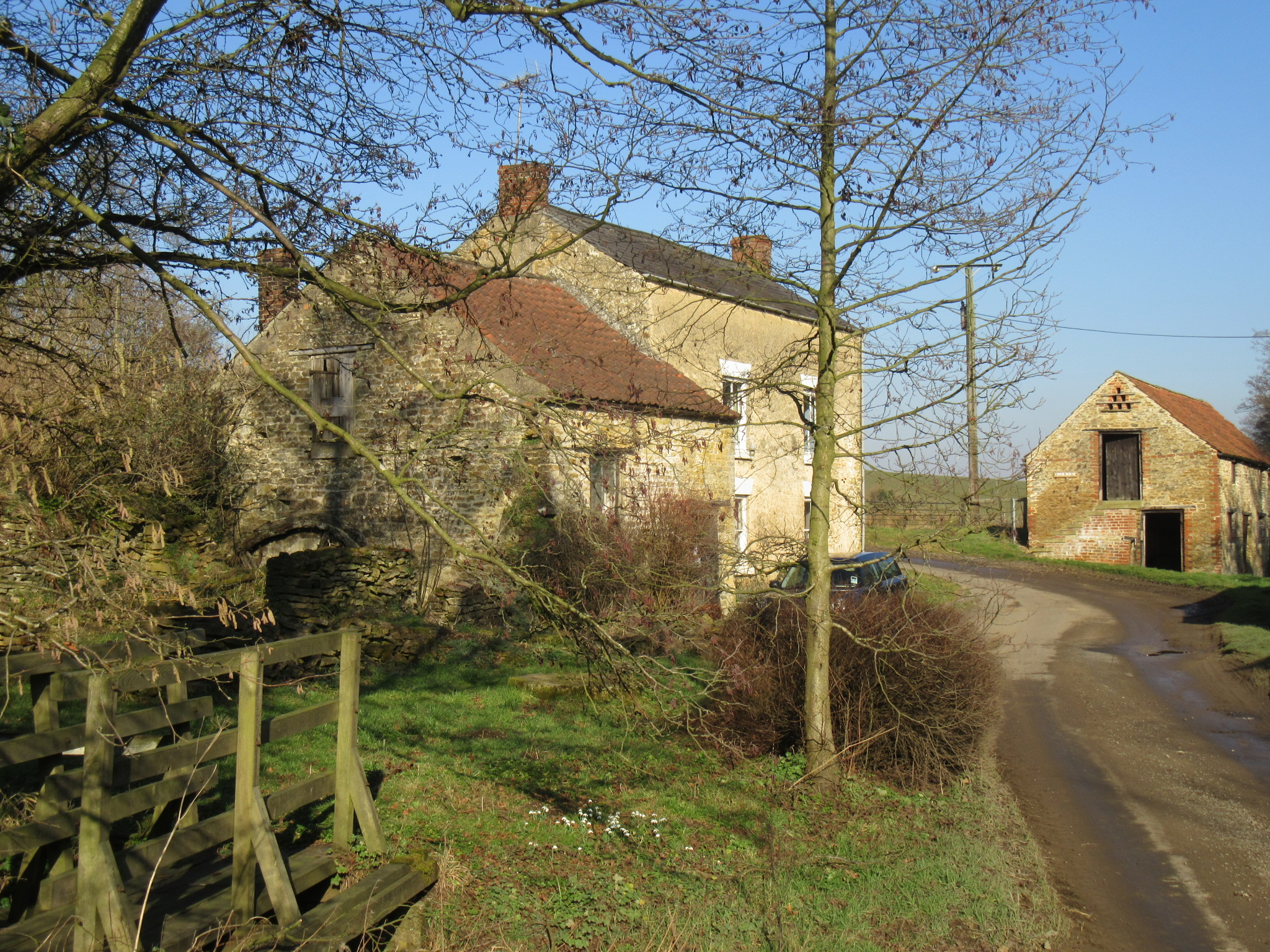
The building, in 2019

Coulton Mill is a historic building in Coulton, North Yorkshire, a village in England.

The watermill lies on the Marr Beck, and had a long mill race and two ponds, which are now dry. A mill in Coulton was first recorded in the 13th century, and probably occupied the same site as the present building. It is possible that some Mediaeval stonework remains in the foundations, but the building was altered in the 17th century and refurbished in 1721, with much of the building now dating from the 18th century. It was further altered in the 19th and 20th centuries, but in the 2010s it was placed on the Heritage at Risk Register. It was refurbished in 2020, and is now a house which is also used to produce cider.

The watermill and associated buildings are built of sandstone. The mill has a pantile roof, a single storey with an attic, and two bays. It contains a doorway with a step formed from a millstone, and a window. The wheelpit is parallel to the west gable in the ruins of the wheelhouse. The house to the right is rendered and has a slate roof. There are two storeys, two bays and a continuous rear outshut. The doorway is to the left, and the windows are sashes; all the openings have stuccoed wedge lintels. On the other side of the road are a barn and a cow byre, both with pantile roofs. The barn has a single storey and contains four doors and a pitching hole. The byre has two storeys and three bays, and contains doorways and windows, and in the gable end are dove holes.

Inside the mill, much of the 18th- and 19th-century timber machinery survives, which was used to grind corn to make flour. The 19th-century waterwheel also survives, having been repaired in the 20th century. The building is Grade II* listed on account of its technological and historical interest, role in local economic history, and as an example of vernacular architecture.

== See also ==
- Grade II* listed buildings in North Yorkshire (district)
- Listed buildings in Coulton, North Yorkshire
