= Listed buildings in Cawton =

Cawton is a civil parish in the county of North Yorkshire, England. It contains three listed buildings that are recorded in the National Heritage List for England. All the listed buildings are designated at Grade II, the lowest of the three grades, which is applied to "buildings of national importance and special interest". The parish contains the village of Cawton and the surrounding area. All the listed buildings are in the village, and consist of two farmhouses and a limekiln.

== Buildings ==
Name and location	Photograph	Date	Notes
Cawton Manor Farm; 54.18209°N 1.01922°W	—	Late 17th century	The house is in pebbledashed limestone on a stone plinth, with quoins, and a pantile roof with coped gables and shaped kneelers with rosettes. There are two storeys and a cellar, and an L-shaped plan with a front range of two bays. The doorway is in the west gable end, and it has a quoined surround and a lintel with a keystone, above which is a carved coat of arms. The windows are a mix of casements and sashes, some horizontally-sliding, and the cellar has a three-light chamfered mullioned window.
Sundial Farmhouse; 54.18266°N 1.01947°W	—	Late 17th century	The farmhouse is in rendered limestone and has a Welsh slate roof. There are two storeys and four bays. In the centre is a doorway, above which is a sundial, and the windows are three-light horizontally-sliding sashes.
Limekiln; 54.18227°N 1.02103°W	—	19th century	The limekiln is in stone and brick, and is about 5 metres (16 ft) high. There is a brick arch over the main chamber, and a small brick arch to the flue at the rear.
