= Coulton, North Yorkshire =

Village and civil parish in North Yorkshire, England

Coordinates: 54.16703°N 1.0279°W

Coulton
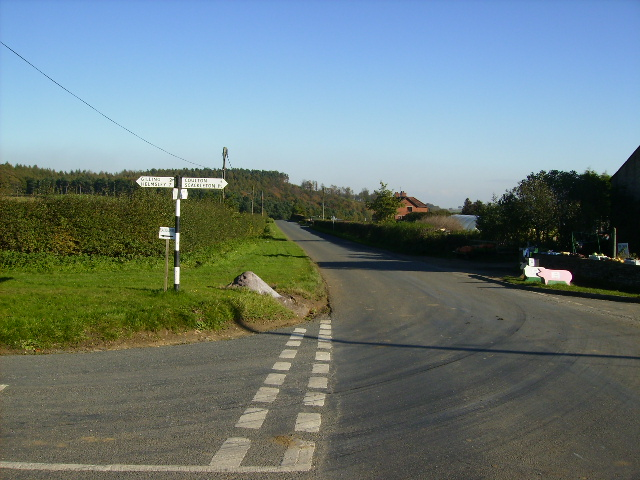
- Crossroads near Coulton

- Location within North Yorkshire
- Population: 235 (Including Grimston. 2011)
- OS grid reference: SE634567
- Unitary authority: North Yorkshire
- Ceremonial county: North Yorkshire
- Region: Yorkshire and the Humber
- Country: England
- Sovereign state: United Kingdom
- Post town: YORK
- Postcode district: YO62
- Police: North Yorkshire
- Fire: North Yorkshire
- Ambulance: Yorkshire
- UK Parliament: Thirsk and Malton

Coulton is a village and civil parish in the county of North Yorkshire, England, it is about 6 miles (9.7 km) south of Helmsley.

== History ==
The village is mentioned in the Domesday Book as Coletun. The lands around the village are mentioned in four entries, in which landowners at the time of the Norman invasion include Orm, Son of Gamal, Othulf, Uthred and King Edward. After the invasion, the lands were granted to Count Robert of Mortain, Hugh, son of Baldric and King William.

Coulton Mill was first recorded in the 12th century and is a grade II* listed building.

== Governance ==
The village lies within the Thirsk and Malton UK Parliament constituency. It was part of the Ryedale district between 1974 and 2023. It is now administered by North Yorkshire Council.

== Geography ==
The nearest settlements are Hovingham 2.25 miles (3.62 km) to the north-east; Scackleton 1 mile (1.6 km) to the south-east; Cawton 1.5 miles (2.4 km) to the north and Brandsby 2.1 miles (3.4 km) to the south-west.

The 1881 UK Census recorded the population as 131. This decreased to 69 in the 1961 UK Census.

== See also ==
- Listed buildings in Coulton, North Yorkshire
