= Terrington =

Village and civil parish in North Yorkshire, England

Coordinates: 54.127529°N 0.972630°W

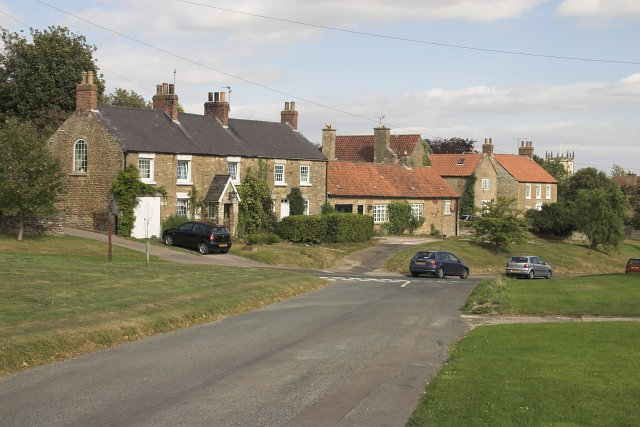
- Houses at Terrington

- Location within North Yorkshire
- Population: 459 (2011 census)
- OS grid reference: SE672706
- Civil parish: Terrington
- Unitary authority: North Yorkshire
- Ceremonial county: North Yorkshire
- Region: Yorkshire and the Humber
- Country: England
- Sovereign state: United Kingdom
- Post town: YORK
- Postcode district: YO60
- Dialling code: 01653
- Police: North Yorkshire
- Fire: North Yorkshire
- Ambulance: Yorkshire
- UK Parliament: Thirsk and Malton

Terrington is a village and civil parish in North Yorkshire, England. It is situated in the Howardian Hills, 4 miles (6.4 km) west of Malton.

== History ==
The village is mentioned four times in the Domesday Book of 1086 as Teurintone. The lands were divided between the manors of Bulmer and Foston. At the time of the time of Norman Conquest of England, lands in the manor were held by Ligulf, Northmann, Earl Morcar, Earl Waltheof and Gamal, son of Karli. Afterwards the lands were granted to Robert, Count of Mortain, Count Alan of Brittany and Berengar of Tosny. The manor was held soon after by Niel Fossard and then followed the descent of the manor of nearby Sheriff Hutton. Other lands were tenanted in the 13th century by the Latimer family and followed the descent of his manor at Danby until the 16th century. The manor was not held in demesne like other manors. In 1427 the manor was held by the lord of Sessay manor, Edmund Darell, and remained in his family until 1752. At that time it was sold to Henry Howard, 4th Earl of Carlisle. Those lands that were part of Foston manor became the property of the Lutrell family of Appleton-le-Street.

The village name is Old English, but of uncertain meaning. One suggestion is that it is from Tiefrung, a picture, linked to an older history of a Roman villa and mosaic floors. Another is the Anglo-Saxon name for witchcraft. Lastly, it could be the combination of the Saxon personal name, Teofer, and tun, meaning Teofers farm.

== Governance ==
The village is within the Thirsk and Malton UK Parliament constituency. It is also within the Hovingham and Sheriff Hutton electoral division of North Yorkshire Council. From 1974 to 2023 it was part of the district of Ryedale.

The parish includes the hamlets of Wiganthorpe, Mowthorpe, and Ganthorpe.

== Geography ==
The village lies less than 1.5 miles (2.4 km) from the nearest settlements of Wiganthorpe, Dalby, and Ganthorpe.

The Ebor Way and Centenary Way long-distance footpaths pass through the village.

=== Demography ===
In 1881, the population of the parish was recorded as 685. At the 2001 census it had a population of 520 of which 51.3% were male and 48.7% female. There were 245 dwellings of which 132 were detached. By the time of the 2011 Census the population had reduced to 459.

== Amenities ==
The village has many small businesses, a shop and café, a village hall, a mobile post office and a public house (which closed in 2011). The village is served by the Malton to Scackleton bus service and seasonally by the Helmsley to Castle Howard service.

=== Education ===
Primary education is provided at Terrington CE Primary School. The school is within the catchment area of Malton School for secondary education.

Terrington Pre-School Playgroup also provides pre-school education from 2 years to school age serving Terrington but also the surrounding villages, of Hovingham, Welburn, Slingsby and further afield. It is based at Terrington Village Hall.

The village is also home to Terrington Hall Preparatory School, a medium-sized independent preparatory school for boys and girls aged 3 to 13, with a mixture of flexible/weekly boarders and day pupils.

=== Sports ===
The village has a Tennis & Pickleball Club which plays on the two courts at the Village Hall. The village also has a Bowls Club which uses the village bowling green.

In addition to the tennis & pickleball courts, Terrington Village Hall has a recreation ground with a full-sized football pitch. Its main hall also caters for badminton and indoor pickleball.

== Religion ==
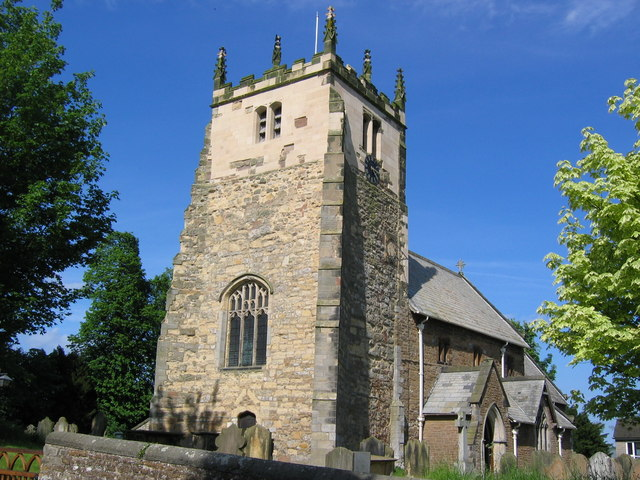
All Saints' Church, Terrington. The top of the tower has been rebuilt.

The village church is dedicated to All Saints. It has some Saxon remnants, and its site was probably a place of worship even earlier. It is a Grade I listed building.

A Wesleyan chapel was built in the village in 1816 and a Primitive Methodist chapel was built in 1867. The latter is now the music room of the preparatory school.

== Notable people ==
- Richard Spruce (1817–1893), botanist

== See also ==
- Listed buildings in Terrington
