= Listed buildings in Scackleton =

Scackleton is a civil parish in the county of North Yorkshire, England. It contains two listed buildings that are recorded in the National Heritage List for England. Both the listed buildings are designated at Grade II, the lowest of the three grades, which is applied to "buildings of national importance and special interest". The parish contains the village of Scackleton and the surrounding countryside, and both of the listed buildings are houses.

== Buildings ==
Name and location	Photograph	Date	Notes
Manor Farmhouse; 54.14678°N 1.01069°W	—	17th century	The house is in sandstone, with quoins, and a swept pantile roof with gable copings and shaped kneelers. There are two storeys, three bays, and a lower single-bay service wing. The doorway has a divided fanlight. The windows are a mix; some are mullioned, and the others are sashes, some horizontally sliding.
Hovingham Lodge; 54.15915°N 1.00482°W		1829	The house, later divided, is in limestone with a hipped Westmorland slate roof. There are two storeys and four bays. On the front is a Tuscan porch, and a doorway with an architrave and a keystone. The windows are sashes, those in the ground floor tripartite, and all have wedge lintels with keystones.
