= Listed buildings in Terrington =

Terrington is a civil parish in the county of North Yorkshire, England. It contains 20 listed buildings that are recorded in the National Heritage List for England. Of these, one is listed at Grade I, the highest of the three grades, and the others are at Grade II, the lowest grade. The parish contains the village of Terrington, the hamlets of Ganthorpe, Mowthorpe and Wiganthorpe, and the surrounding countryside. Most of the listed buildings are houses, cottages, farmhouses and associated structures, and the others include a church, a tomb in the churchyard, and a village pump.

== Key ==
| Grade | Criteria |
|---|---|
| I | Buildings of exceptional interest, sometimes considered to be internationally important |
| II | Buildings of national importance and special interest |

== Buildings ==
| Name and location | Photograph | Date | Notes | Grade |
|---|---|---|---|---|
| All Saints' Church; 54.12840°N 0.97325°W | | 11th century | The church has been altered and extended through the centuries, including a restoration in 1870 by Ewan Christian. It is built in limestone with a Westmorland slate roof, and consists of a nave with a clerestory, north and south aisles, a south porch, a chancel with a north chapel and vestry, and a west tower. The tower has two stages, diagonal buttresses, a west Tudor arched doorway under a triangular relieving arch, a three-light west window, a south clock face, two-light bell openings, and an embattled parapet with eight pinnacles. | I |
| Ganthorpe House, gates and railings 54.12466°N 0.94617°W | — | Early 18th century | The house is in sandstone on a plinth, with a rear wing in brick, coved eaves, and roofs of blue pantile and Welsh slate with gable coping and shaped kneelers. There are two storeys, a front range of three bays, a two-bay cross-wing on the right, and extensions to the rear. The doorway has an eared architrave, a pulvinated frieze, and a moulded pediment. The windows are sashes in moulded architraves. In front of the garden are wrought iron railings and a gate. | II |
| Dovecote, Ganthorpe House; 54.12493°N 0.94588°W | — | 18th century or earlier | The dovecote in the garden to the north of the house is in sandstone with a hipped Westmorland slate roof. It contains a stable door and an opening for the birds, and is divided internally into two storeys, with nesting boxes on the upper floor. | II |
| Village pump, Ganthorpe; 54.12453°N 0.94649°W | | 18th century | The pump is in sandstone, and has a rectangular plan. It has a chamfered plinth, a rectangular shaft with chamfered angles, and openings for the former handle and water pipe, and is surmounted by a moulded cornice. | II |
| Hornsey Cottage; 54.12729°N 0.97182°W | — | Mid to late 18th century | The house is in limestone with a pantile roof. There are two storeys and two bays, and a rear outshut. In the centre is a doorway, and the windows are horizontally sliding sash windows. The ground floor openings have wedge lintels. | II |
| Paddocks Cottage; 54.12460°N 0.94382°W | | Mid to late 18th century | The house is in sandstone with sprocketed eaves and a pantile roof. There are two storeys and three bays. On the front is a gabled porch flanked by horizontally sliding sash windows. To the right is a casement window, and above it is a horizontally sliding sash window. The ground floor windows have wedge lintels. | II |
| Former Bay Horse Public House; 54.12746°N 0.97559°W | | Late 18th century | Two houses, at one time a public house, in limestone and sandstone, with a pantile roof, gable coping and shaped kneelers. There are two storeys and four bays. Steps lead up to the right doorway, which has a divided fanlight, to the left is another doorway, to the left of which is a canted bay window. The other windows are sashes, some horizontally sliding, all with wedge lintels. | II |
| Stable block and wall, Ganthorpe House; 54.12471°N 0.94647°W | — | Late 18th century | The stable block is in sandstone, the interior is lined with yellow brick, and it has a pantile roof. There is one storey and an attic. The openings include sash windows, one with a segmental head, doorways, one with a round head, and all with keystones. Over the stable door is a pitching door in a dormer. Attached to the stable is a coped sandstone wall. | II |
| Gate Farmhouse; 54.12441°N 0.94498°W | | Late 18th century | Two cottages combined into one house, it is in sandstone, and has a steeply pitched pantile roof with gable coping and shaped kneelers. There are two storeys and two bays, and a single-storey wing to the right. On the front is a doorway with a divided fanlight and a blocked doorway to its left. The windows are sashes, the window in the wing horizontally sliding. | II |
| Manor Farmhouse, railings, gates and gateposts 54.12459°N 0.94671°W | | Late 18th century | The farmhouse is in sandstone, and has a steeply pitched pantile roof with gable coping and shaped kneelers. There are two storeys and two bays, and a lower wing to the left. The central doorway has a divided fanlight, the windows are sashes, and all the openings have channelled lintels. Enclosing the front garden are wrought iron railings and gates, and stone gate posts. | II |
| Mowthorpe Dale; 54.11667°N 0.94683°W | — | Late 18th century | The farmhouse is in sandstone with a pantile roof. There are two storeys, three bays, and a rear cross-wing and outshuts. On the front is a doorway, to its left are horizontally sliding sash windows, the window in the ground floor with a wedge lintel, and to the right are casement windows. | II |
| Rough Hills Farmhouse; 54.11457°N 0.95711°W | | Late 18th century | The farmhouse is in limestone, and has a pantile roof with gable coping and shaped kneelers. There are two storeys, two bays, and a single-storey wing to the right. The doorway is in the centre, and the windows are horizontally sliding sashes, those in the ground floor with wedge lintels. | II |
| The Hollies; 54.12747°N 0.97660°W | — | Late 18th century | The house is in limestone, with a floor band, and an M-shaped pantile roof with gable coping and shaped kneelers. There are two storeys, a double depth plan, three bays, and a single-storey extension to the left. The central doorway has fluted pilasters, a radial fanlight and consoles, and above it is a round-arched sash window with a keystone. The other windows are sashes with wedge lintels and keystones. | II |
| Mowthorpe Hill Farmhouse; 54.11358°N 0.96634°W | — | Late 18th to early 19th century | The farmhouse is in sandstone, with sprocketed eaves, and a pantile roof with gable coping. There are two storeys, three bays, and a rear service outshut. The central doorway has a fanlight, the windows are sashes, and all the openings have channelled lintels. | II |
| Stable block, Wiganthorpe Hall; 54.14236°N 0.98760°W | — | Late 18th to early 19th century | The stable block to the hall, now demolished, is in brick, with a dentilled eaves course, a Westmorland slate roof, two storeys and a U-shaped plan. The central range has five bays, and the wings have two bays to the front and three to the courtyard. The central range contains three elliptical-arched carriage entrances, the wings have one round-arched carriage entrance, and all parts have sash windows. On the central range is a pediment with a clock, and a cupola with a weathervane. | II |
| The Lodge; 54.12731°N 0.97770°W | — | Late 18th to early 19th century | The house is in sandstone, with sprocketed eaves, and a pantile roof with gable coping and shaped kneelers. There are two storeys, three bays, and a rear service cross wing. The central doorway has fluted pilasters, a radial fanlight, and a dentilled open pediment. The windows are sashes with wedge lintels and keystones. | II |
| Ice house, Wiganthorpe Hall; 54.14335°N 0.98736°W | — | Early 19th century (probable) | The ice house to the hall, which has been demolished, has a gritstone passage and a brick interior. An L-shaped corridor with a barrel vault leads to a chamber with a diameter of 16 feet (4.9 m) and a domed roof. | II |
| Tomb of John Woodhouse Forth; 54.12838°N 0.97353°W | — | 1804 | The tomb is in the churchyard of All Saints' Church, to the west of the church. It is a chest tomb in limestone, about 1 metre (3 ft 3 in) in height. On each side is an elliptical plaque with an inscription, flanked by urns on their sides. On the corners are shell motifs, there are fluted angle pilasters, and the tomb is surmounted by a plain slab. | II |
| Terrington Hall; 54.12809°N 0.97283°W | | 1827 | Originally a rectory, later a school, it is in sandstone with a hipped Westmorland slate roof. There are two storeys, five bays, and a rear extension. In the centre, steps lead up to a Tuscan porch with paired columns, and double doors under a divided fanlight. The windows are sashes. | II |
| Smithy House and The Cottage; 54.12777°N 0.97809°W | — | Early to mid-19th century | The house and attached cottage are in limestone with a pantile roof. There are two storeys and five bays. On the front are two doorways with divided fanlights, the windows are sashes, and all the openings have wedge lintels. | II |
