= All Saints' Church, Hovingham =

Church in North Yorkshire, England

Coordinates: 54°10′23″N 0°58′49″W

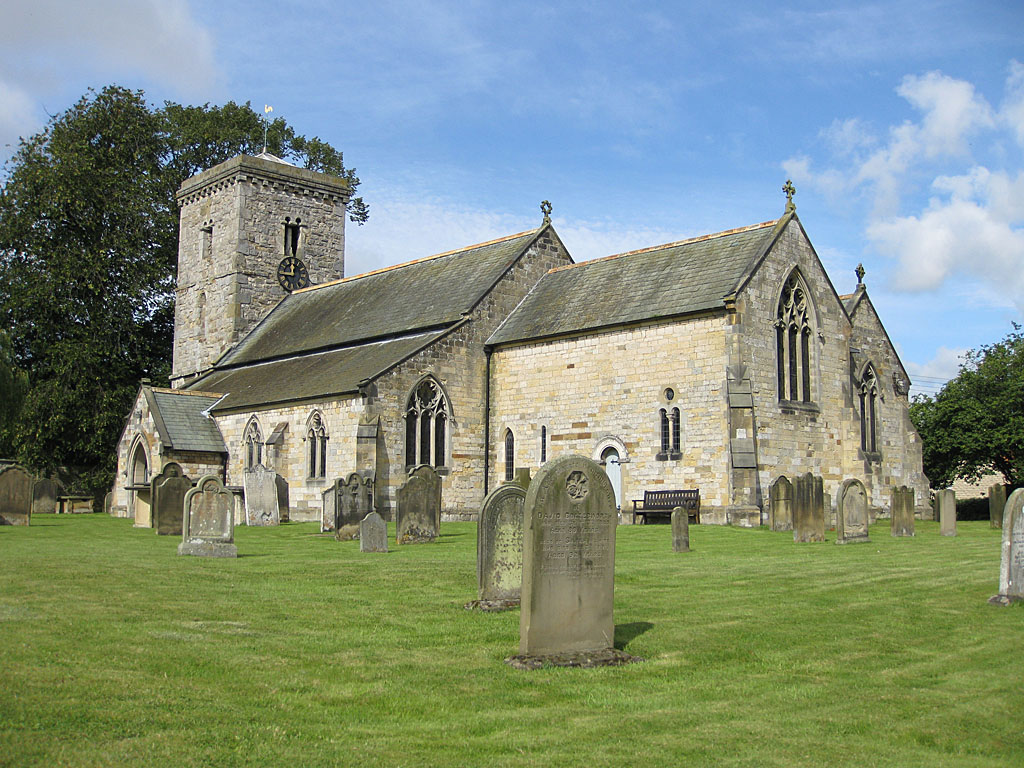
The church, in 2012

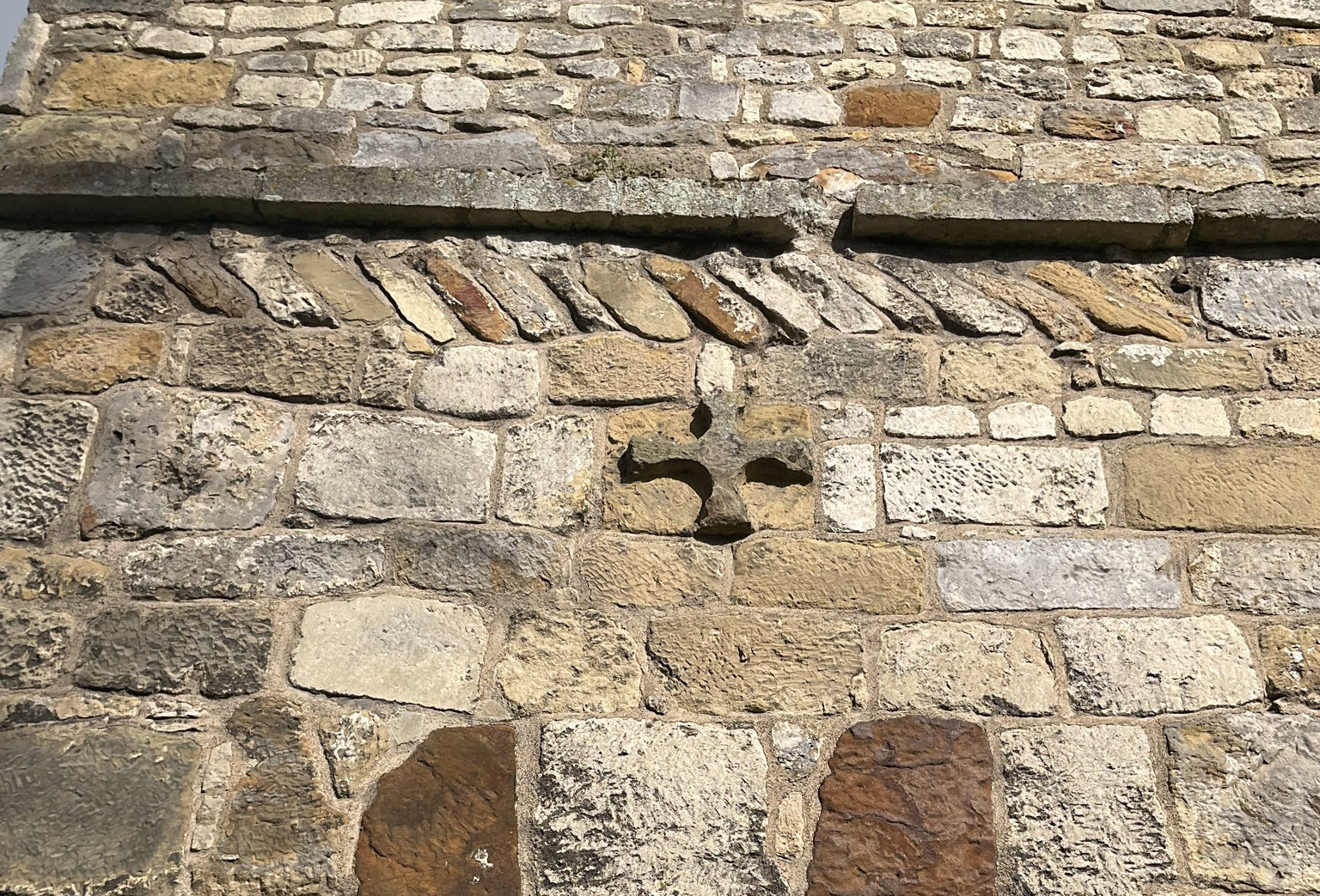
9th century cross embedded in first phase of the church tower

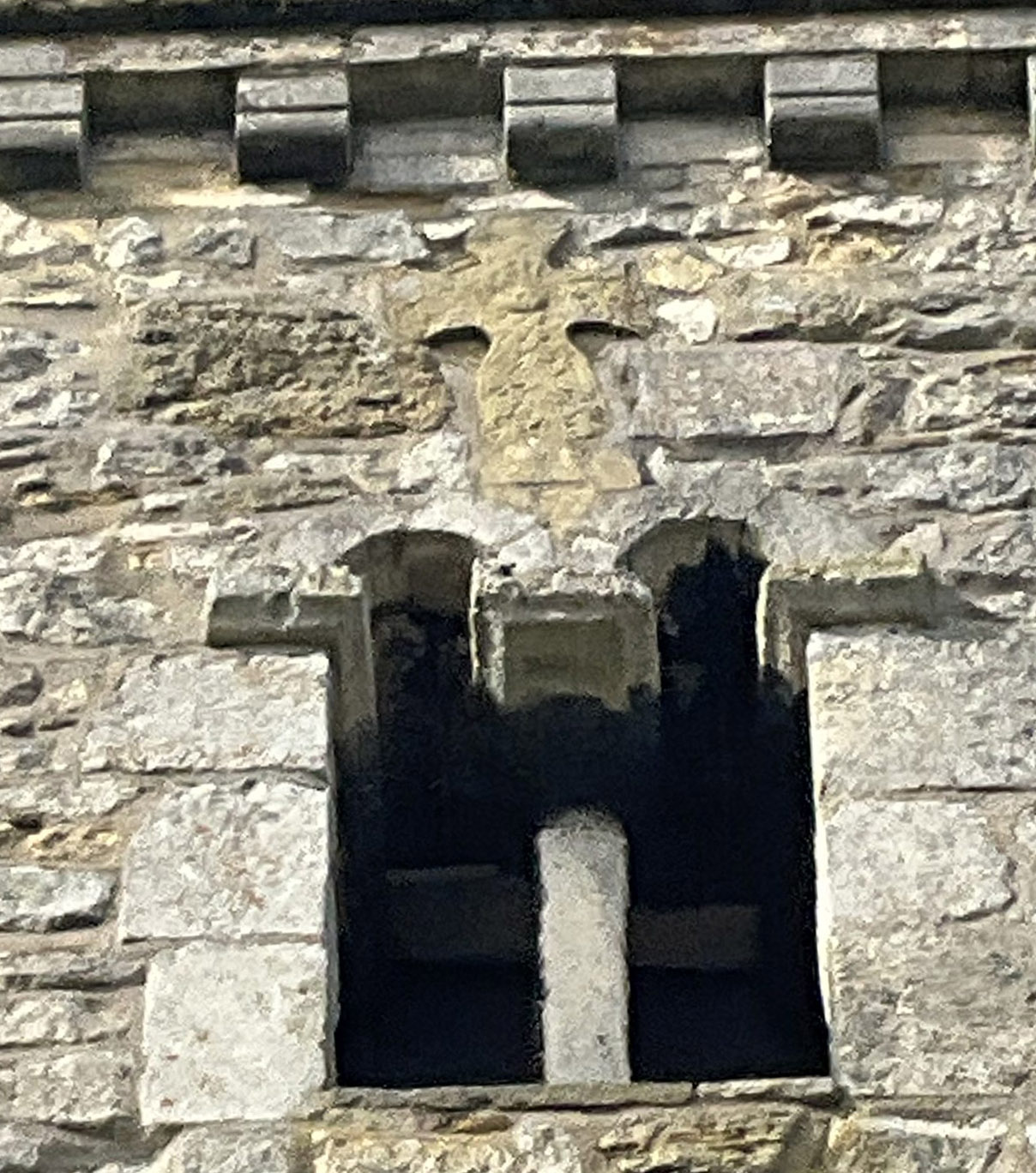
10th century cross, third stage of church tower

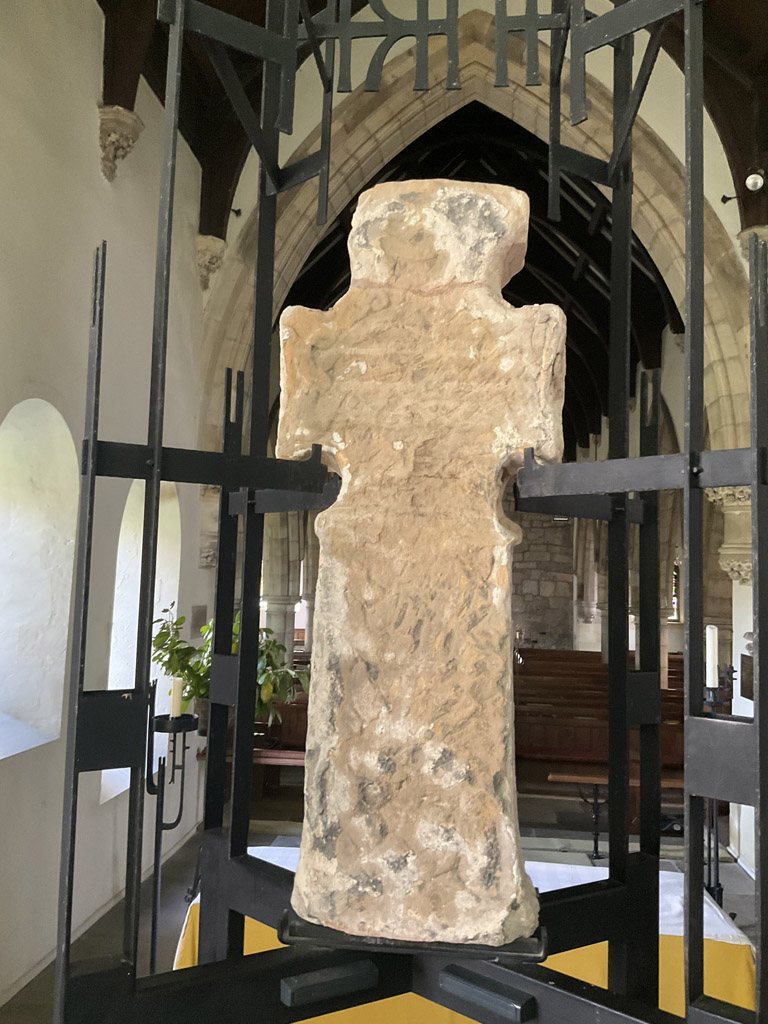
10th century cross, inside the church

All Saints' Church is an Anglican church in Hovingham, a village in North Yorkshire, in England.

The church was built in the 11th century, from which period the tower survives. The remainder of the church was rebuilt in 1860, in a 13th-century style, by Rohde Hawkins. The tower was re-roofed in about 1970. The church has been grade II* listed since 1954.

The church is built of limestone with a Westmorland slate roof, and consists of a nave, north and south aisles, a south porch, a chancel with a north vestry, and a west tower. The tower has three stages, and contains a round-arched west doorway with free-standing shafts and four orders. Above are string courses, a 9th-century carved cross, a round-headed window and slit windows in the middle stage, and above are narrow double bell openings, a 10th-century wheel cross, an east clock face, and a corbel table. The south doorway is Norman, with two orders, and in the south wall of the chancel is a re-set round-arched doorway.

Inside, the reredos is a stone slab carved in about 800, but very worn from previously having been set in the south wall of the tower. It depicts eight human figures under an arcade, with a plant scroll at the bottom, incorporating carvings of birds. It is described by the Corpus of Anglo Saxon Stone Sculpture as one of the "most complex and ambitious" carvings of its period in the area, and possessing an "ease and delicacy". A 10th-century carved cross was stolen in 2015.

== See also ==
- Grade II* listed churches in North Yorkshire (district)
- Listed buildings in Hovingham
- Heritage England's detailed description
