= Scackleton =

Village and civil parish in North Yorkshire, England

Coordinates: 54°08′49″N 1°00′32″W

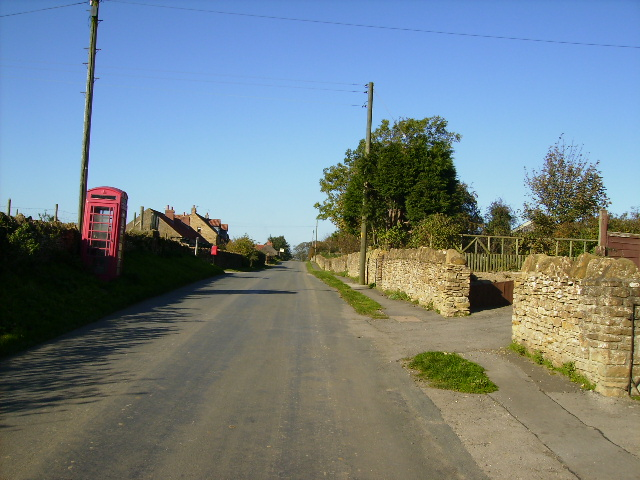
- Scackleton village

- Location within North Yorkshire
- Population: 109
- OS grid reference: SE646957
- Unitary authority: North Yorkshire
- Ceremonial county: North Yorkshire
- Region: Yorkshire and the Humber
- Country: England
- Sovereign state: United Kingdom
- Post town: YORK
- Postcode district: YO62
- Police: North Yorkshire
- Fire: North Yorkshire
- Ambulance: Yorkshire
- UK Parliament: Thirsk and Malton

Scackleton is a village and civil parish in the county of North Yorkshire, England. It is in the Howardian Hills and 2 miles (3.2 km) south-west of Hovingham.

== History ==
The village is mentioned three times in the Domesday Book of 1086 as Scacheldene or Scachelsey in the Bulford hundred. At the time of the Norman Conquest in 1066, the lands around the village were owned by Orm, son of Gamal, Earl Waltheof and Gamal, son of Kalri. Afterwards the lands were granted to Hugh, son of Baldric, Count Robert of Mortain and King William I.

A school was built in the village in 1866, but is no longer in use. A Primitive Methodist church was also erected in 1888, which is also no longer in use.

== Governance ==
The village lies within the Thirsk and Malton UK Parliament constituency. It was part of the Ryedale district between 1974 and 2023. It is now administered by North Yorkshire Council.

The 1881 UK Census recorded the population as 165. The 2001 UK Census recorded the population as 109, of which 76 were over the age of sixteen and 52 of those were in employment. There were 48 dwellings of which 24 were detached. The 2011 Census showed the population as less than 100. Details are now included within Coulton.

== Geography ==
The nearest settlements are Coulton 1 mile (1.6 km) to the north; Wiganthorpe 1 mile (1.6 km) to the south-east and Hovingham 2 miles (3.2 km) to the north-east.

== Religion ==
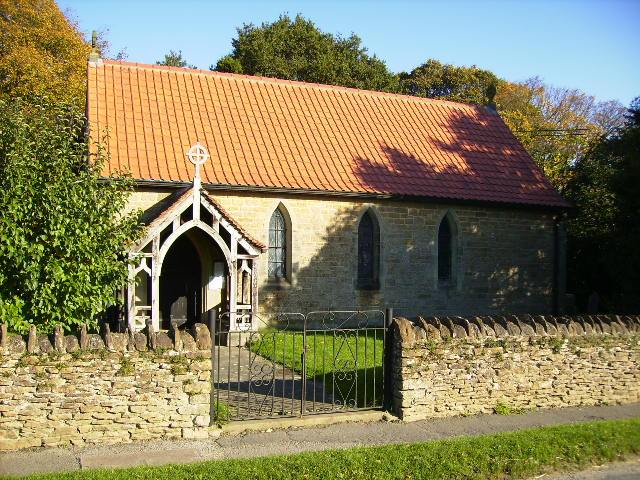
St George the Martyr Church, Scackleton

St George the Martyr's Church, Scackleton, was built in the early 20th century.

== See also ==
- Listed buildings in Scackleton
