= Calcaria =

Town in the Roman province of Britannia

Coordinates: 53.885°N 1.263°W

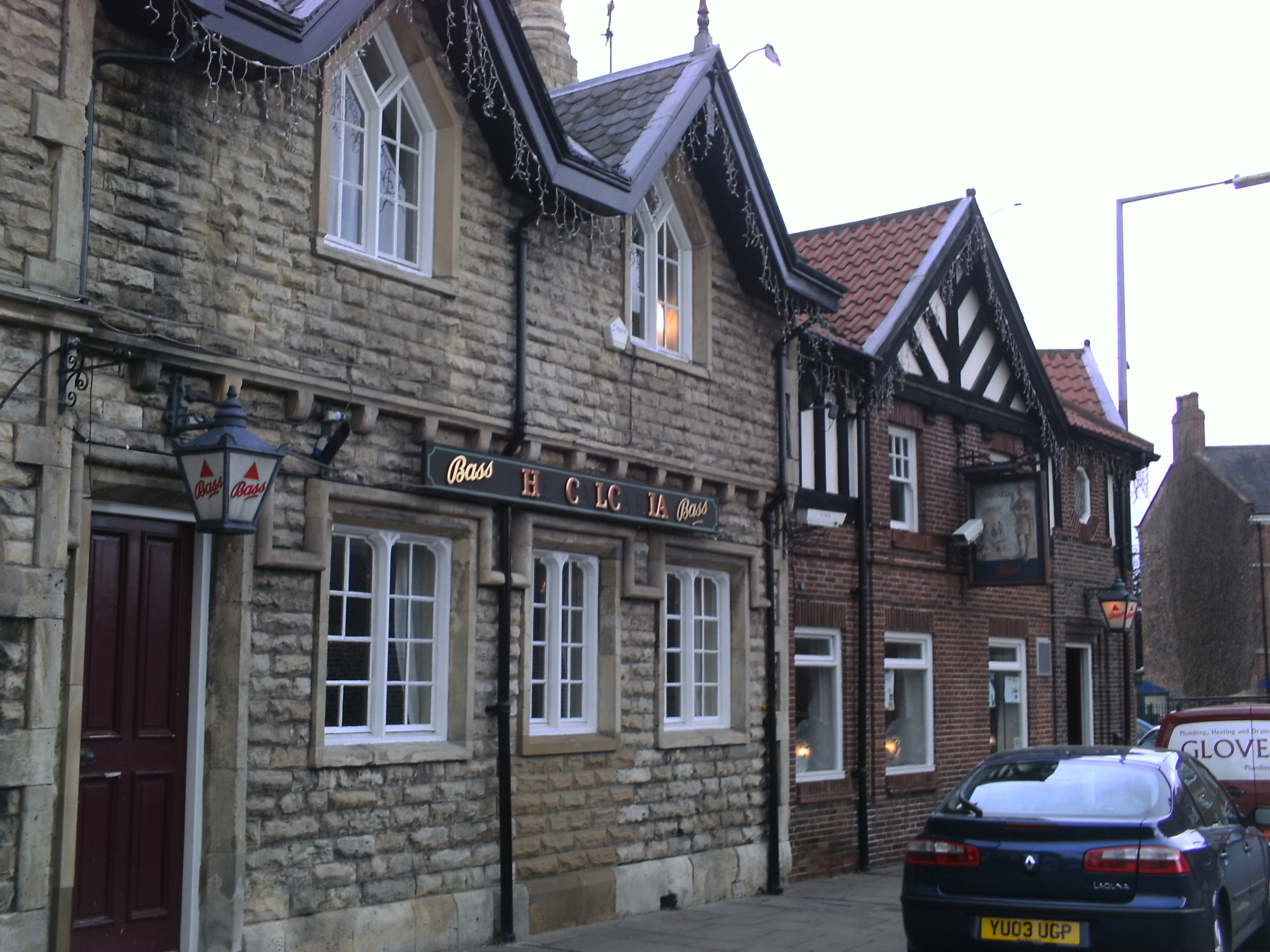
The former Calcaria public house in Tadcaster, the namesake of Calcaria

Calcaria was a town in the Roman province of Britannia. Today, it is known as Tadcaster, located in the English county of North Yorkshire.

The Romans founded the settlement and named it Calcaria from the Latin word for lime kilns, reflecting the importance of the area's Magnesian Limestone geology as a natural resource for quarrying. The nature of the settlement is uncertain. It is possible that it started as an Imperial staging post with a mansio because of its location at a river crossing on the road from Danum (Doncaster) to Eburacum (York). Just to the north-west is the Roman fort at Newton Kyme (possibly Praesidium) dating from the 4th century. Mileages on the Antonine Itinerary suggest that Calcaria may have lain well west of Tadcaster.

== Sources ==
- Garlick, Tom (1971). Roman Yorkshire. Clapham: Dalesman Publishing.
- Arias, Gonzalo (1987). Grammar in the Antonine Itinerary. La Linea: Arias.
