= Cawton =

Village and civil parish in North Yorkshire, England

Coordinates: 54.182200°N 1.017186°W

- Location within North Yorkshire
- Population: 48
- OS grid reference: SE642767
- Civil parish: Cawton
- Unitary authority: North Yorkshire
- Ceremonial county: North Yorkshire
- Region: Yorkshire and the Humber
- Country: England
- Sovereign state: United Kingdom
- Post town: YORK
- Postcode district: YO62
- Police: North Yorkshire
- Fire: North Yorkshire
- Ambulance: Yorkshire
- UK Parliament: Thirsk and Malton

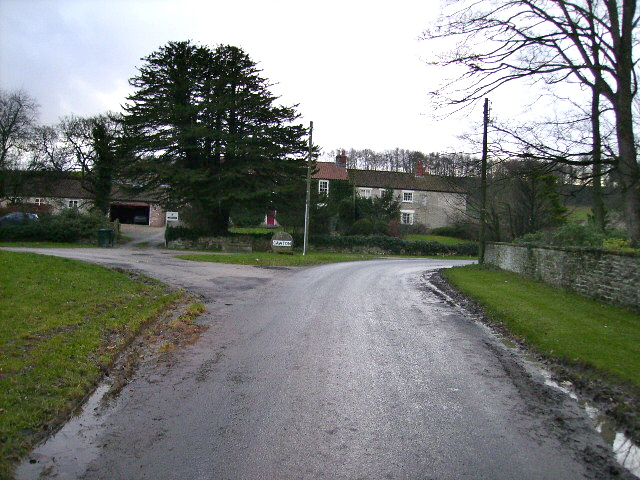
Entering the village

Cawton is a village and civil parish in North Yorkshire, England, about ten miles west of Malton. According to the 2001 census it had a population of 48. It is due east of Gilling East (where the 2011 Census figures are included), and south-east of Oswaldkirk. It is on the path of the Ebor Way.

From 1974 to 2023 it was part of the district of Ryedale, it is now administered by the unitary North Yorkshire Council.

== See also ==
- Listed buildings in Cawton
