= Julian Bannerman =

British garden designer and architect

Julian Bannerman (born 26 June 1951) is a British designer of gardens and buildings known for his work on historical gardens in the UK including the restoration of the gardens at Highgrove House, the private residence of King Charles III.

== Career ==
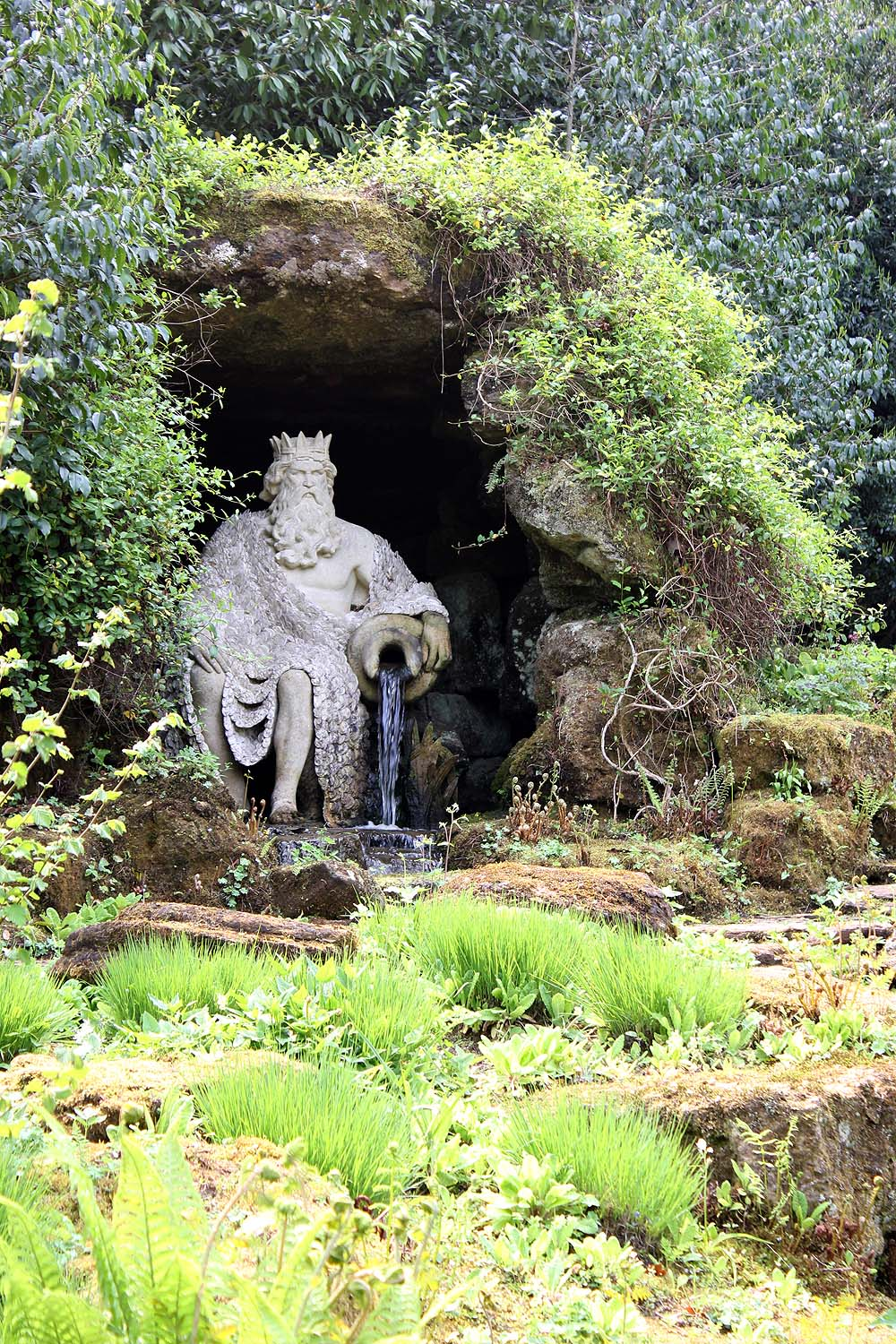
Neptune Grotto at Woolbeding Garden

In 1989 Julian and his wife Isabel were invited to join a team building a modern grotto under a work of British sculptor Simon Verity at Leeds Castle in Kent. This led to their first major commission by Jacob Rothschild at Waddesdon Manor where they re-purposed the Dairy Buildings into an office and events venue and restored the water and rock gardens at the Dairy. Their work there won Civic Trust and Europa Nostra awards. They were commissioned to create a stumpery at Highgrove House by King Charles III in the late 1990s. Their rejuvenation of the five-acre walled garden at the Marquess of Cholmondeley’s Houghton Hall also won an award.

The Bannermans sold The Ivy in 1993 and moved to Hanham Court near Bristol, where they restored the court and created a garden open to the public. In 2000 the couple was asked by Simon Sainsbury and Stewart Grimshaw to redesign the Entrance garden and Pleasure Grounds area and enhance the Long Walk at Woolbeding House in Sussex. They were commissioned in 2001 by Jigsaw founder John Robinson to design and develop the garden at Euridge Manor Farm in Wiltshire, now a wedding venue. There the pair also designed and built a modern medieval abbey in which the garden is set. The Bannermans were subsequently commissioned by the Duke and Duchess of Norfolk to create "The Collector Earl’s Garden” at Arundel Castle in Sussex.

After receiving an invitation to enter a competition to come up with a design, the duo completed the Queen Elizabeth II September 11th Garden in 2010. The garden is located in Hanover Square in the Financial District of New York City and commemorates the 67 British victims of the 11 September 2001 attack on the World Trade Center. Queen Elizabeth II attended the opening on 6 July 2010. The Bannermans moved on to Trematon Castle in 2012, leased from the Duchy of Cornwall and another garden was created in the grounds, which included a medieval keep. The couple also designed the garden at Wormsley Park, Buckinghamshire for John Paul Getty II and have played a major role in redesigning the gardens of Dumfries House in Ayrshire.

In 2019, they moved to Ashington Manor in Somerset, which is also being renovated and improved with a newly created garden and orchards. The Bannermans have appeared as speakers at various gardening and literary festivals over the course of their careers, including The Chalke Valley History Festival, The Garden Museum Literary Festival, Charleston Festival of the Garden and Dartington Hall Ways with Words.

== Awards and honors ==
- 1992 Europa Nostra Heritage Award for Waddesdon Manor
- 1993 Civic Trust Award for Waddesdon Manor
- Gold Medal at the RHS Chelsea Flower Show in 1994.
- 1997 Royal Warrant awarded by the Prince of Wales.
- 2007 Christie's Garden of the Year Award for Houghton Hall.
- 2008 Carpenters Guild Award for Arundel Castle Collector Earl’s Garden

== Personal life ==
Julian studied fine art at Oxford Ruskin School of Art and in the 1970s, he worked for Richard Demarco on Edinburgh Arts and in the Demarco Gallery. He met his wife Isabel in Edinburgh in the early 1980's and together they ran Bannerman's Bar before buying a semi derelict Wiltshire mansion called The Ivy, where they explored their mutual passion for building restoration and garden design.
