= Lynden Miller =

American landscape designer (born 1938)

Lynden Breed Miller
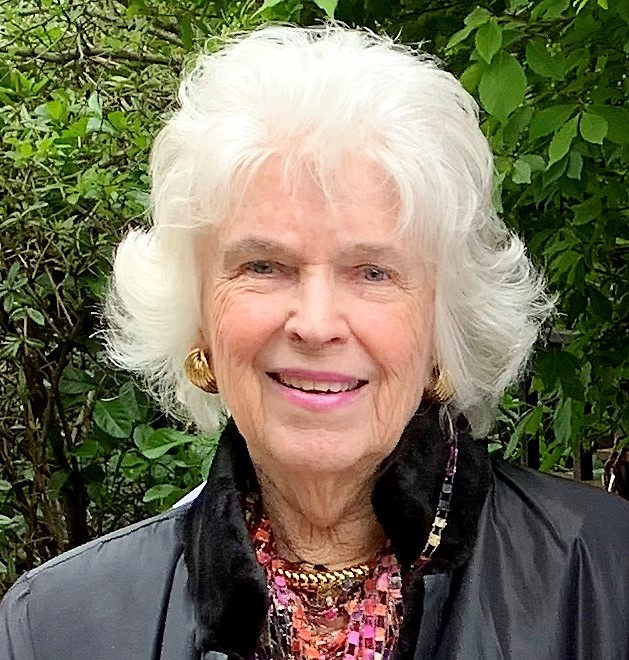
- Born: December 8, 1938 (age 87); New York, New York
- Occupations: Landscape and garden designer
- Spouse: Leigh Miller

Lynden B. Miller (born December 8, 1938) is an author, an advocate for public parks and gardens, and a garden designer, best known for her restoration of the Conservatory Garden in New York's Central Park, completed in 1987.

== Education and early career ==
Lynden Ryder Breed grew up in Washington, D.C., and New York. Through her mother, she is a descendant of a long line of lawyers and jurists including Judge William Butler Hornblower. She graduated from Smith College (Class of 1960), where she majored in art history and spent her junior year abroad at the University of Florence. She married Leigh Miller, an attorney, in 1966.

Miller pursued a career in fine art painting which spanned 18 years. Combining her aesthetic talents and training, knowledge gained from horticultural classes in Chelsea-Westminster College in England and instruction at the New York Botanical Garden, Miller first designed her own garden at her home in Sharon, Connecticut, in 1979. Her selection of plants was influenced by her desire to fill the space like a canvas with texture and color in every season. She experimented with a broad palette of colors and range of native flora, shrubs, annuals and perennials to create her signature painterly plantings. Joanne Kaufman of The Wall Street Journal wrote "She has a kind of full-blooming forcefulness that could get a century plant to reconsider its position and flower annually." In 1999, Smith College recognized Lynden in their Remarkable Women: A Smith Continuum with the quote "Lynden uses the beauty and enchantment of public gardens to instill new pride in communities and change the personal and public experience of urban life."

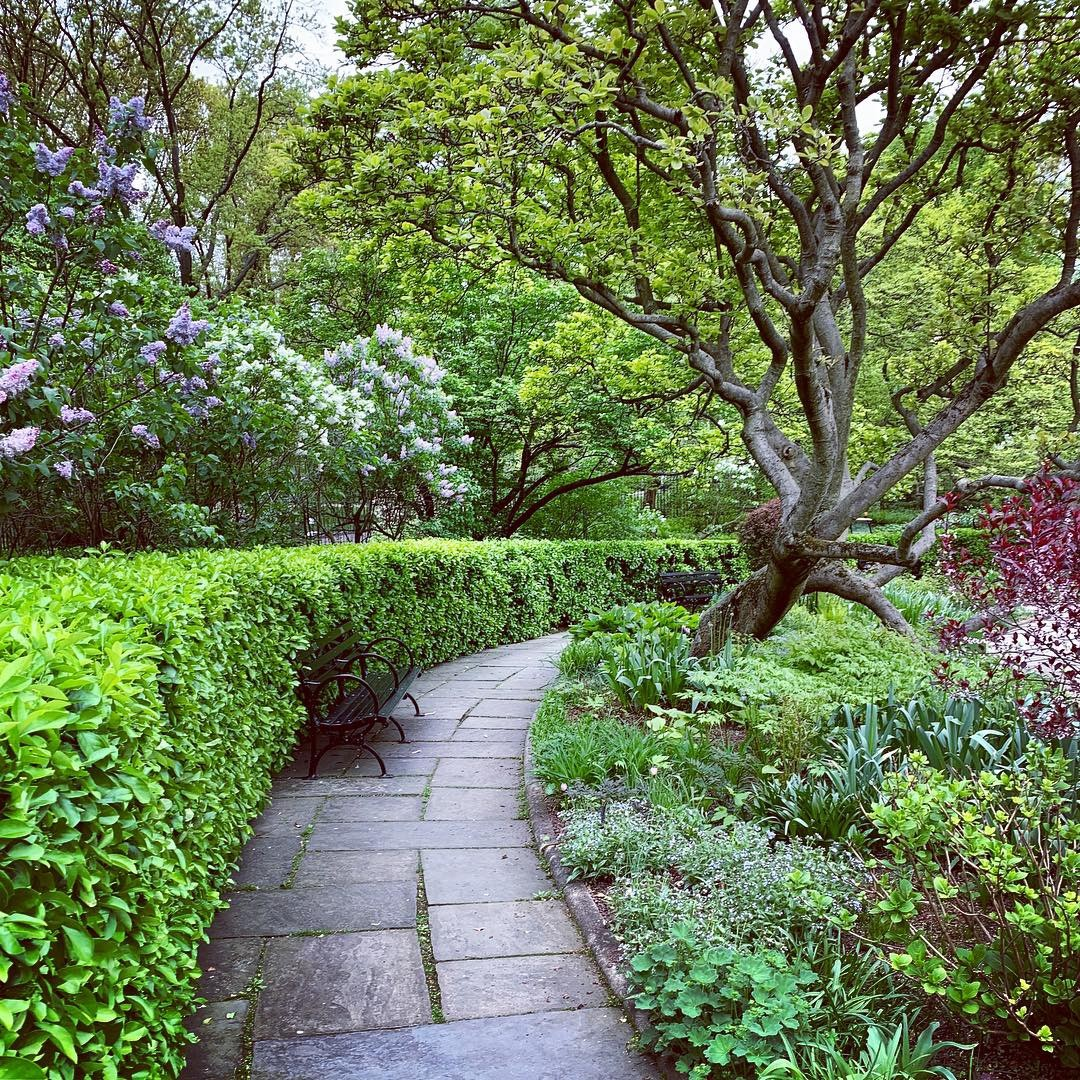
Conservatory Garden, Central Park, May 2019

== Conservatory Garden, Central Park ==
In 1982, Elizabeth Barlow Rogers, a friend who at the time was the Administrator of Central Park, invited Miller to help restore The Conservatory Garden, six neglected and vandalized acres located at Fifth Avenue and 104th Street. Her efforts came at a time when the garden was considered by some to be dangerous. Besides restoring and redesigning the plantings, Miller was able to raise an endowment of 1.5 million in order to hire five professional gardeners. She also recruited volunteers to help care for the overgrown East Harlem garden. The result was a much-visited lush refuge in the Northern end of Central Park. In a 2019 interview, Miller said, "There's something really quite wonderful about being able to bring a connection with nature to people, especially who live in a city."

== Career and commissions ==
=== Public parks ===
Miller's very visible success with The Conservatory Garden led to subsequent commissions, collaborative plantings and redesigns of established gardens. She has been lauded for designs and renewals of numerous urban spaces such as Bryant Park and referred to as "New York City's very own Miss Rumphius" for bringing beauty to everyone. Examples include:

- Miller collaborated with Laurie Olin on the design of Bryant Park.
- Bryant Park closed in 1988 and when it reopened in 1992, Miller's effective intervention resulted in gardens that drew people to the park.
- Miller redesigned the Jane Watson Irwin Perennial Garden at New York Botanical Garden to ensure four seasons of color. The original plan was by Dan Kiley.
- Madison Square Park - In 2000, Miller was hired to replant the entire park.
- The Heather Garden at Fort Tryon Park has a garden created by Miller and partner Ronda Brands
- Chelsea Cove Entry Garden at Hudson River Park (Pier 62) - The garden designed by Miller opened in May 2010
- The British Garden at Hanover Square For this garden originally designed by Julian and Isabel Bannerman, and commemorating the victims of the September 11, 2001 attacks, Miller collaborated with Ronda M. Brands on the installation of species typical of a British garden.
- Two gardens at the Bayard Cutting Arboretum in Great River, NY.
- Pier 44 Waterfront Garden in Red Hook, Brooklyn.
- She has completed the restoration of the Russell Page Garden at the Frick Collection in 2024.

=== Campuses ===
University campuses such as Columbia University Princeton University, and Stony Brook University (14 acres) have sought out Miller's expertise. In 1996, Miller was asked to update the campus at Columbia in time for the Centennial observation of their move to the Morningside campus.

=== Initiatives ===
Miller is adamant about working on public gardens rather than private properties. A good example of this is her collaboration with Dutch bulb grower Hans van Waardenburg in the aftermath of the September 11 attacks; Miller launched the Daffodil Project and together with the New York City Department of Parks and Recreation and New Yorkers for Parks, she led the planting of thousands of daffodils throughout the city to honor the victims of the attack. As of 2026, over 20 million daffodils have been planted in parks, school yards, community gardens and tree beds on sidewalks throughout the five boroughs. Miller's contributions to this program were recognized with the naming of a narcissus "Lovely Lynden" in her honor.

== Books and film ==
Miller has lectured widely on garden design, horticulture and advocacy for public spaces. She has written articles for numerous magazines and botanical publications including Fine Gardening, the Royal Horticultural Society Journal, American Nurseryman, and American Horticulturist. Her book, Parks, Plants, and People: Beautifying the Urban Landscape won a Horticultural Society National Book Award in 2010. The book details not only her approach to designing attractive gardens for public use but also how to secure funding and volunteers for these maintenance heavy endeavors. Miller's central tenet is "Make it gorgeous and they will come. Keep it that way and they will help."

Most recently she narrated and hosted a documentary about one of America's most notable landscape architects, Beatrix Jones Farrand called Beatrix Farrand, American Landscapes. The film was directed by Stephen Ives and produced by Anne Cleves Symmes.

== Teaching ==
Miller taught at NYU from 2006-2023 as an adjunct professor in their Urban Design and Architecture Program.

== Philanthropy ==
Miller serves on the Boards of the Central Park Conservancy, the New York Botanical Garden and New Yorkers for Parks. She is also a member of the Friends of the Botanic Garden Advisory Committee at Smith College.

== Awards ==
- 2026 Veitch Memorial Medal, Royal Horticultural Society
- 2019 Landscape Award, LongHouse Reserve
- 2018 Living Landmark Award, New York Landmarks Conservancy
- 2012 August Heckscher Award for Community Service, CIVITAS
- 2011 George Robert White Medal, Massachusetts Horticultural Society
- Frederick Law Olmsted Award, Central Park Conservancy
- 2006 Vail Medal, Cleveland Botanical Garden, for "significant national contributions to the field of horticulture"
- 1993 Elvira Broome Doolan Medal, Garden Club of America, "Presented for her diligence and belief in the refreshing quality of plants, coupled with a sensitivity for people working together to make things happen, giving her the impetus to envision new gardens for New York City."

== Personal life ==
Miller is married to Leigh Miller and has two sons, Marshall and Gifford and two step-sons, Ethan and Christian. Her son Gifford Miller is the former Speaker of the New York City Council who represented the 5th district.
