= Jack Stooks =

British businessman, former gardener to Charles III (born 1978)

- Born: Jack Nicholas Stooks; 4 March 1980 (age 46); Chinhoyi, Zimbabwe, Africa
- Other name: The Royal Gardener
- Occupations: Gardener, Horticultural expert
- Known for: Former Gardener to King Charles III, Queen Camilla, William, Prince of Wales and Prince Harry

Jack Stooks is a British horticulturalist, former senior royal gardener, and media commentator. He served for more than two decades at Highgrove House (the private residence of King Charles III), working as Senior Gardener and contributing to the development, maintenance and public presentation of the estate's gardens. Following his tenure at Highgrove, Stooks has worked as a television contributor, public speaker and gardening expert appearing across UK and international media.

== Early life and education ==
Jack Stooks was born and grew up in Zimbabwe where he developed an early interest in horticulture and garden design. He trained professionally in horticulture in the UK before beginning his career in private and estate gardens. Details about his early education and qualifications have been mentioned in media profiles of his later work.

== Career ==
=== Royal Gardens at Highgrove ===
Stooks joined the gardening team at Highgrove and worked for 21 years in the role of Senior Gardener, described in one article as “Highgrove’s longest-serving gardener”. During his tenure he helped maintain and develop the estate's organic gardens, assisted with seasonal garden management, specialist planting schemes and guided educational visits. He has noted the high level of oversight by the King: “If he came home at the weekend, he would be out in the garden checking what’s been done, what hasn’t been done.” In his role Stooks has also provided commentary on horticulture topics such as pest control using organic methods, in his capacity as a former Highgrove gardener.

=== Media and public appearances ===
After leaving his role at Highgrove, Stooks has appeared as a gardening and royal commentator in British media outlets. For example, he provided expert commentary for an article about protecting box hedges and referenced his 21 years at Highgrove in that context. He is also listed by a talent-management company as “a gardening expert and Royal Commentator” following his work at Highgrove. Furthermore, Stooks co-founded the media and production venture Royalty Ltd alongside former royal butler Grant Harrold, under which he engages in public speaking, events and media projects related to royal life and horticulture.

Stooks leads gardening workshops, garden history talks and horticultural masterclasses throughout the UK, demonstrating planting, floristry and seasonal garden design, as well as giving commentary on the history and maintenance of royal gardens. His media appearances reflect both his horticultural expertise and his background in royal estate gardening.

== Personal life ==
Stooks is based in the Cotswolds region and continues to work on gardening, media and educational projects throughout the United Kingdom. He has publicly defended the role of the monarchy and the significance of the estates he worked on.
