= Highgrove Florilegium =

Two-volume book of botanical illustrations

- Author: Charles III
- Language: English
- Subject: Botanical illustrations
- Publisher: Addision Publications
- Publication date: 2008–2009
- Publication place: England
- Media type: Print
- OCLC: 463290110
- Website: The Highgrove Florilegium

The Highgrove Florilegium: Watercolours depicting plants grown in the garden at Highgrove is a two-volume book of botanical illustrations recording plants in the garden of Charles III, the then Prince of Wales, at Highgrove House in Gloucestershire, England. The volumes, published in 2008 and 2009, contain 124 watercolours painted by invited leading botanical artists from around the world. The colour plates are reproduced in their original size from watercolour drawings. The publication is a limited edition of 175 sets, each signed by the Prince and all the royalties from the Highgrove Florilegium are donated to The Prince's Charities Foundation. The text is by Christopher Humphries and Frederick J. Rumsey and the preface is by the Prince of Wales. The publisher is Addison Publications. Each set is accompanied by a handmade green felt book cover with maroon ties.

== Book production ==
=== Design ===
The book contains original sketches of motifs from the garden at Highgrove decorate the text and the end papers. The decorative motifs include plants in the garden, the Princes' treehouse, the dove cote and the flock of Indian Runner Ducks.

=== Printing ===
The printing of both the text and the image pages used stochastic lithography in order to create outstanding quality prints from the original watercolours. Stochastic lithography is an advancement in printing technology that can give a better print quality, cleaner more dynamic and accurate colour images, and reduce running waste. Whereas conventional lithography uses half-tone dots of various sizes and spaces these dots at the same distance from each other, stochastic lithography uses microdots of a common size of various spacing according to tonal value. Stochastic screening uses smaller printing dots to create a higher image detail. Tonal ranges and colour contrasts are also improved because the variation in dot distribution increases ink densities. The images were printed on 245 gsm American Cotton paper for the colour plates and on 175 gsm Somerset Bookwove text paper. The text is set in Fairbank and Bembo book types.

=== Bookbinding ===
The books are half-bound in red goatskin with marbled paper boards and sprinkled edges. The pages were collated and sewn by hand. That is, after the text and plate pages were soft folded, holes were punched into them for the sewing needle. Then the pages were sewn and the boards of the book cover were laced on. The collated and sewn books are hand finished with embossed hand tooled leather motifs and gold leaf tooling on the spine.

=== Marbling ===
Each sheet of paper was hand marbled separately using the traditional technique of sprinkling the colours onto a viscous fluid prepared from Carragheen moss and manipulating a pattern in the paint using a stylus. The paper is carefully lowered onto the floating pattern and then lifted, rinsed and hung out to dry. Each pattern on each piece of paper must be controlled to check they are the same.

== Artists ==
Each plate is signed by the artist and blind embossed to record the copyright of A.G. Carrick Ltd, with the plate and edition numbers added in pencil.

- Beverly Allen (b. Sydney, Australia)
- Helen Allen FLS (b. London, England)
- Fay Ballard (b. Twickenham, England)
- Caroline Barber (b. Bristol, England)
- Isobel Bartholomew (b. Birmingham, England)
- Stephanie Berni (b. Bristol, England)
- Evelyn Binns (b. Orpington, England)
- Valerie Bolas (b. Dover, England)
- Marie-Christine Bouvier (b. Geneva, Switzerland)
- Dr Valerie Bradburn (b. Sidcup, England)
- Jenny Brasier (b. Alvechurch, England)
- Dr Andrew Brown (b. Carshalton, England)
- Jane Bruce (b. London, England)
- Elizabeth Cadman (b. Chelmsford, England)
- Diana Carmichael (b. Penrhyn Bay, Wales)
- Gillian Condy (b. Kenya)
- Jill Coombs (b. Horsham, England)
- Joanna Craig-McFeely (b. Beckenham, England)
- Celia Crampton (b. Nyasaland, now Malawi)
- Sally Crosthwaite (b. Woking, England)
- Brigitte E.M. Daniel b. Beaconsfield, England)
- Rachael Dawson (b. Dronfield, England)
- Angélique de Folin (b. Paris, France)
- Elisabeth Dowle (b. London, England)
- Kate Nessler (b. St Louis (MI), United States)
- Anne O’Connor (b. Sydney, Australia)
- Susan Ogilvy (b. Kent, England)
- John Pastoriza-Piñol (b. Melbourne, Australia)
- Annie Patterson (b. RAF Halton, England)
- Juliet Percy (b. Bromley, England)
- Jenny Phillips (b. Victoria, Australia)
- Josephine Elwes (b. London, England)
- Kate Evans (b. Liverpool, England)
- The Hon. Gillian Foster (b. Dumfries, Scotland)
- Yvonne Glenister Hammond (b. London, England)
- Sarah Gould (b. Leicester, England)
- Lucinda Mary Grant (b. London, England)
- Josephine Hague (b. Liverpool, England)
- Ann Judith Harris-Deppe (b. Accra, Ghana)
- Noriko Hasegawa (b. Tokyo, Japan)
- Mayumi Hashi (b. Nara, Japan)
- Mieko Ishikawa (b. Tokyo, Japan)
- Junko Iwata (b. Nagoya, Japan)
- Jenny Jowett (b. Bromley, England)
- Yumi Kamataki (b. Chiba, Japan)
- Christabel King (b. London, England)
- Margaret King MBE, JP (b. Zimbabwe)
- Kumiko Kosuda (b. Miyagi Prefecture, Japan)
- Flappy Lane Fox (b. Farnborough, England)
- Chrissie Lightfoot (b. London, England)
- Fiona McKinnon (b. Darlinghurst, Australia)
- Katherine Manisco (b. London, England)
- Jill Mayhew (b. Essex, England)
- Kay Rees-Davies (b. Brighton, England)
- Janet Rieck (b. Chicago, United States)
- Lizzie Sanders (b. London, England)
- Elaine Searle (b. Birmingham, England)
- Sheila Siegerman (b. Kamloops, Canada)
- Sally Strawson (b. Yorkshire, England)
- Susanna Stuart-Smith (b. Birmingham, England)
- Jessica Tcherepnine (b. London, England)
- Vicki Thomas (b. South Africa)
- Noriko Tobita (b. Kanagawa-Ken, Japan)
- Erico Tosaki (b. Kawasaki, Japan)
- Sally Townshend (b. East London, South Africa)
- Sally Vincent (b. Leicestershire, England)
- Anita Walsmit Sachs-Jansen (b. Den Haag, The Netherlands)
- Amanda Ward (b. London, England)
- Hazel West-Sherring (b. Kingston upon Hull, England)
- Jennifer Wilkinson (b. Launceston, Australia)
- Susan Worthington (b. Stratford, New Zealand)
- Jane Wright (b. Dorchester, England)

== Purchase and display ==
The book has been purchased by a range of institutions, including:

- libraries (e.g. National Library of Australia; National Library of Scotland; RHS Lindley Library)
- botanical gardens (e.g. Filoli; Royal Botanic Garden Edinburgh; Royal Botanic Gardens, Kew; Royal Botanic Gardens, Melbourne; Royal Botanic Gardens, Sydney)
- museums (e.g. Auckland War Memorial Museum; Canterbury Museum, Christchurch; J. Paul Getty Museum; Teyler's Museum, The Netherlands)
- universities (e.g. University of Johannesburg; University of Minnesota; University of South Africa)

Some of these institutions have put the books on display for public exhibition.
