= Duchy Home Farm =

Organic farm operated by the Duchy of Cornwall

Coordinates: 51.6515°N 2.1477°W

The Duchy Home Farm is an organic farm operated by the Duchy of Cornwall. The farm is part of the gardens of Highgrove House, the country home of King Charles III. The produce is used as ingredients in Duchy Originals products, sold in vegetable boxes, and wholesaled to supermarkets and restaurants. King Charles is credited with using "pioneering agriculture techniques" to produce this organic food.

== Sustainability, organic, and biodynamic farming ==
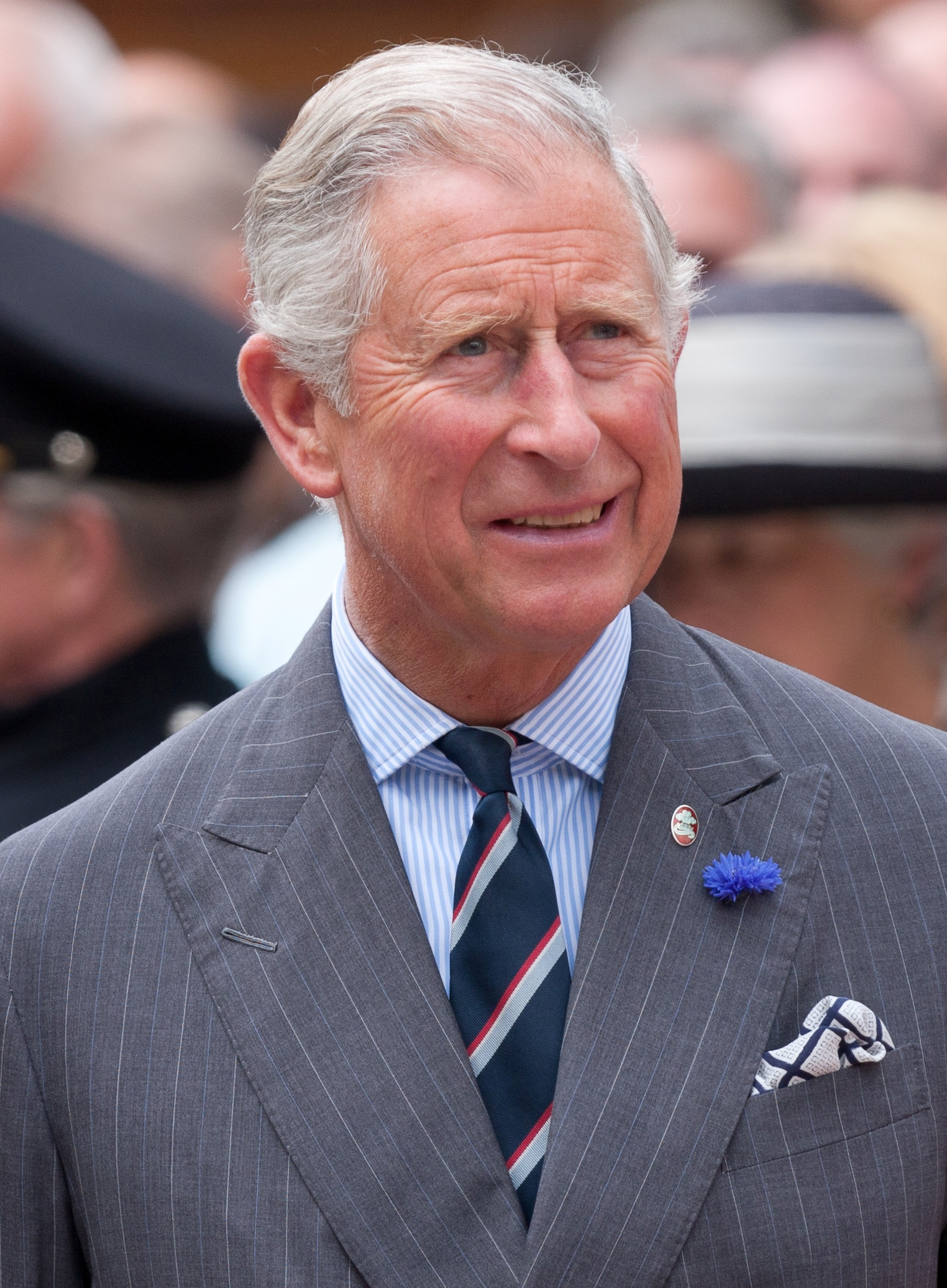
King Charles III

Located in Tetbury, the Home Farm sells fruit and vegetables grown at Highgrove House, King Charles's Gloucestershire home. The estate uses sustainable farming practices and is run by a farm manager, David Wilson, with a supporting staff.

Charles converted the 900 acres (360 ha) Home Farm estate to organic farming in 1986. He was initially criticised for some of his methods with many British farmers disliking his choice to avoid modern techniques. Since that time a significant number of farms have subsequently switched to organic agriculture, and visit Duchy Home Farm to review methods there. In 2006, Patrick Holden, director of the Soil Association declared that "I don't think it can be overestimated" how much that was due to Charles's influence.

The roof of the dairy was fitted with over 400 solar panels in 2011. They cover an area of around 691 m^{2} (7,440 sq ft) and are estimated to generate 86,000 kWh per annum.

The farm epitomises his belief of working with organic methods:

In farming, as in gardening, I happen to believe that if you treat the land with love and respect (in particular, respect for the idea that it has an almost living soul, bound up in the mysterious, everlasting cycles of nature) then it will repay you in kind.

— King Charles III

== Farming and sales ==
Ingredients grown at the Home Farm are used in Duchy Originals products. This ranges from milk and pork to barley and grain. The farm supplies carrots and potatoes to restaurants, supermarkets, and local schools as a wholesaler.

In 1998, they began operating a vegetable box scheme for homes within a 15-mile radius of Tetbury. By 2010 they were selling over 250 boxes every week with an 8 acres (3.2 ha) section of the farm dedicated to the scheme. The growing demand for the boxes and requests from customers to choose their own produce led to the creation of The Veg Shed.

The Veg Shed operated every Wednesday in a converted barn. It closed in May 2013 after eight years of trading because it was no longer making a profit; in 2014 the area given over for vegetable production was being grazed by rare breed pigs. The shop was known for its "evocative potting-shed smell" and for selling unusually shaped vegetables that would normally be rejected for sale in supermarkets. While most of the Veg Shed produce came from the Home Farm there were other items for sale from further away, including lemons and bananas.
