= Betty Hanley =

American lighting designer (1915–2002)

- Hanley c. 1991
- Born: Elizabeth Clare Hanley; December 24, 1915; Grand Rapids, Michigan, U.S.
- Died: 2002 (aged 86–87); Epping, Essex, England
- Occupation: Lampshade designer
- Years active: 1949–1993
- Known for: Lampshade designer to the Royal Family

Elizabeth Clare Hanley (December 24, 1915 – 2002) was an American lampshade designer who served as the official supplier to the British royal family and for all of Buckingham Palace. Originally a Michigander, she spent much of her childhood in France and at a Swiss boarding school before attending multiple fashion design universities. Afterwards, she moved to London and established a lampshade and lighting store, and was awarded a royal warrant as the royal family's lampshade supplier. Hanley also was noted for leasing an important cottage called The Ring on the grounds of Audley End House for multiple decades, renovating it to higher standards.

== Childhood and education ==
Betty Hanley was born on December 24, 1915, in Grand Rapids, Michigan, to a Daughters of the American Revolution family. Her early years were shaped by the involvement of her grandparents after the divorce of her parents when she was a child. Her grandmother was one of the earlier suffragettes and her grandfather a local judge, both of which influenced her views. When she was nine, she left to join her mother and aunt in France and was sent to a Swiss boarding school. She worked with her mother at the Red Cross after graduating while living with her aunt, whose connections and guests also gave Hanley multiple connections among European royalty. She then went on to attend both the Parsons School of Design and Parsons Paris.

== Career ==
After obtaining her fashion degrees, she moved to the United Kingdom in 1947 and established her own lampshades and other lighting fixtures business in London in 1949 called Clare House. She was later awarded a royal warrant in 1977 as the official lampshade supplier for Buckingham Palace and the private homes of the British royal family. Other consistent customers of her lamp shop included the Guinness family, the duke and duchess of Gloucester, and the designer company Asprey.

== Personal life ==
As the niece of Fern Bedaux and her husband Charles Bedaux, Hanley was given ownership of her aunt's home Château de Candé during the events of World War II due to Fern being detained in Paris. The property itself would be given over to the French government after the war, but all the items in the home were formally made Hanley's inheritance. Many of the pieces and wardrobe from the home, including historical documents and paintings, would be later distributed to the Victoria and Albert Museum, the Louvre, and to the Sworders auction house.

After being given a tour of The Ring, a cottage on the grounds of the Audley End House, she decided to lease and renovate the property, having begun living there in 1963. Her restoration of the cottage was assisted by two of her shop clients, interior designer John Beresford Fowler and architectural historian John Cornforth. She was also close friends with royal interior designer Dudley Poplak.

Due to her prior work with her mother, Hanley was a highly supportive volunteer for the Red Cross division in London. Also, starting in the 1980s, she was an active member of The Friends of Audley End group, frequently hosting parties and tours to raise money to support the upkeep of the Audley End House. She would leave The Ring in 1993, giving up the lease to Poplak, briefly living in a different cottage at the Audley End Village. Then, in 1998, she moved to Epping, Essex, and died due to cancer in 2002.
