= Queen Elizabeth II September 11th Garden =

Garden in Manhattan, New York

Coordinates: 40.704607°N 74.009453°W

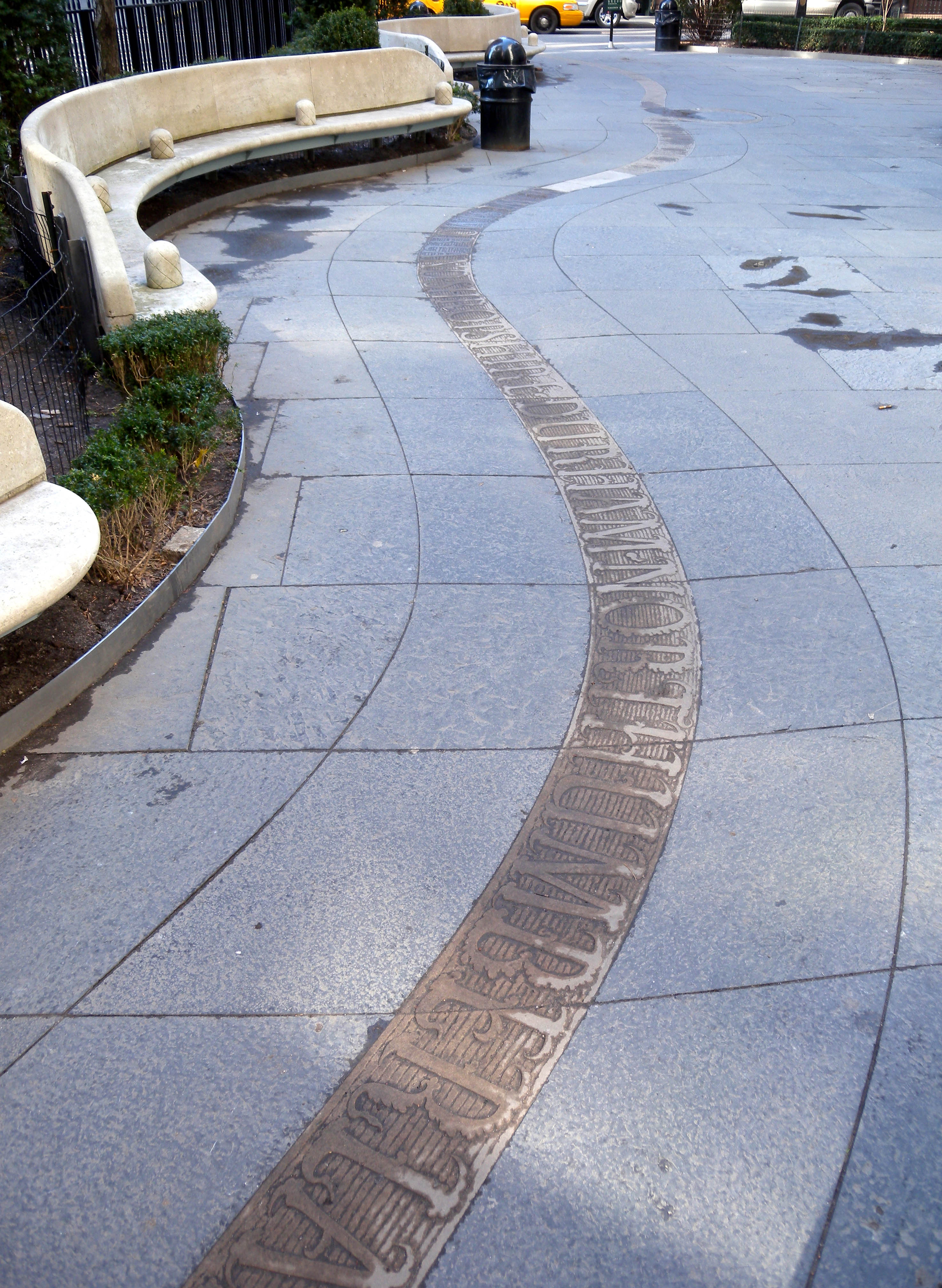
Inscribed with names of Counties of England

The Queen Elizabeth II September 11th Garden is located in Hanover Square in the Financial District of Lower Manhattan, New York City. It commemorates the Commonwealth of Nations member states' victims of the September 11 attacks on the World Trade Center. It was officially opened by Queen Elizabeth II on July 6, 2010, in a ceremony alongside her husband Prince Philip, Duke of Edinburgh, then-Mayor of New York City Michael Bloomberg, then-Governor of New York David Paterson, and then-Governor of New Jersey Chris Christie.

== History ==
Originally planned as The British Memorial Garden, it was officially named The British Garden at Hanover Square by Prince Harry on May 29, 2009. On May 2, 2012, it was renamed the Queen Elizabeth II September 11th Garden at a rededication ceremony led by the Dean of Westminster Abbey. This was to include victims of other Commonwealth of Nations member countries who died in the September 11 attacks.

== Design ==
The original idea for the garden came from Isabel and Julian Bannerman. Lynden Miller and Ronda M. Brands, both garden designers, later helped choose and plan the layout of plants and shrubs for the space.
