= Woolbeding House =

Country house in West Sussex, England

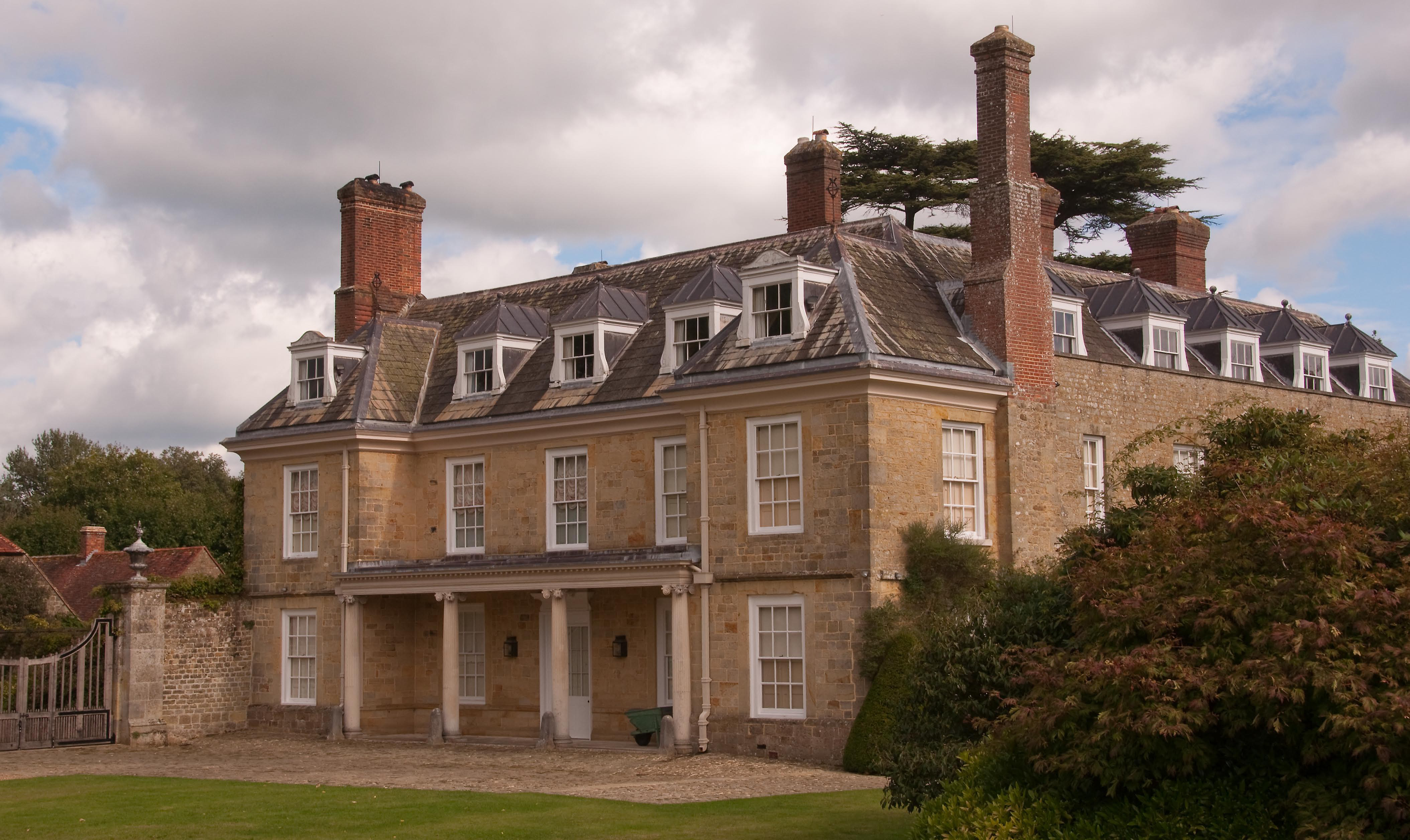
- Interactive map of the Woolbeding House area

General information
- Type: Country House
- Location: Woolbeding, West Sussex, England
- Coordinates: 50.997196°N 0.757052°W
- Completed: 1760

Design and construction
- Designations: Grade I listed

Woolbeding House is an 18th-century country house in Woolbeding, near Midhurst, West Sussex, England. It is a Grade I listed building.

It was probably built by Sir Richard Mill, 5th Baronet between 1711 and 1760 and was originally of a quadrangular plan with an open courtyard in the middle. The courtyard was later roofed over. The house is built of coursed Hythe sandstone in 2 storeys with an attic and has a 7-bay south-facing frontage with 5 hipped dormers. A series of gardens, the Woolbeding Gardens, have been created in the grounds of the estate and they are open to the public.

== History ==
The place Woolbeding, meaning "Wulfbeard's people", was recorded in Domesday Book of 1086, and it had many owners including the de Wolbedinge family and the Earls of Arundel. The manor of Woolbeding belonged to William Aylyng in 1567 and passed by marriage to the Grey family. The Elizabethan building of this period was an H-shaped building. The Greys owned the manor until Margaret Grey married Sir John Mill in 1652, and it was then passed down the Mill family. The current house was likely to have been built by Sir Richard Mill between 1711 and 1760 as a quadrangle-shaped building with an open courtyard, although parts of the house including the two chimney breasts and part of walling may be from the earlier building. Previous occupants included Charlotte Smith and her husband who rented the house in 1785.

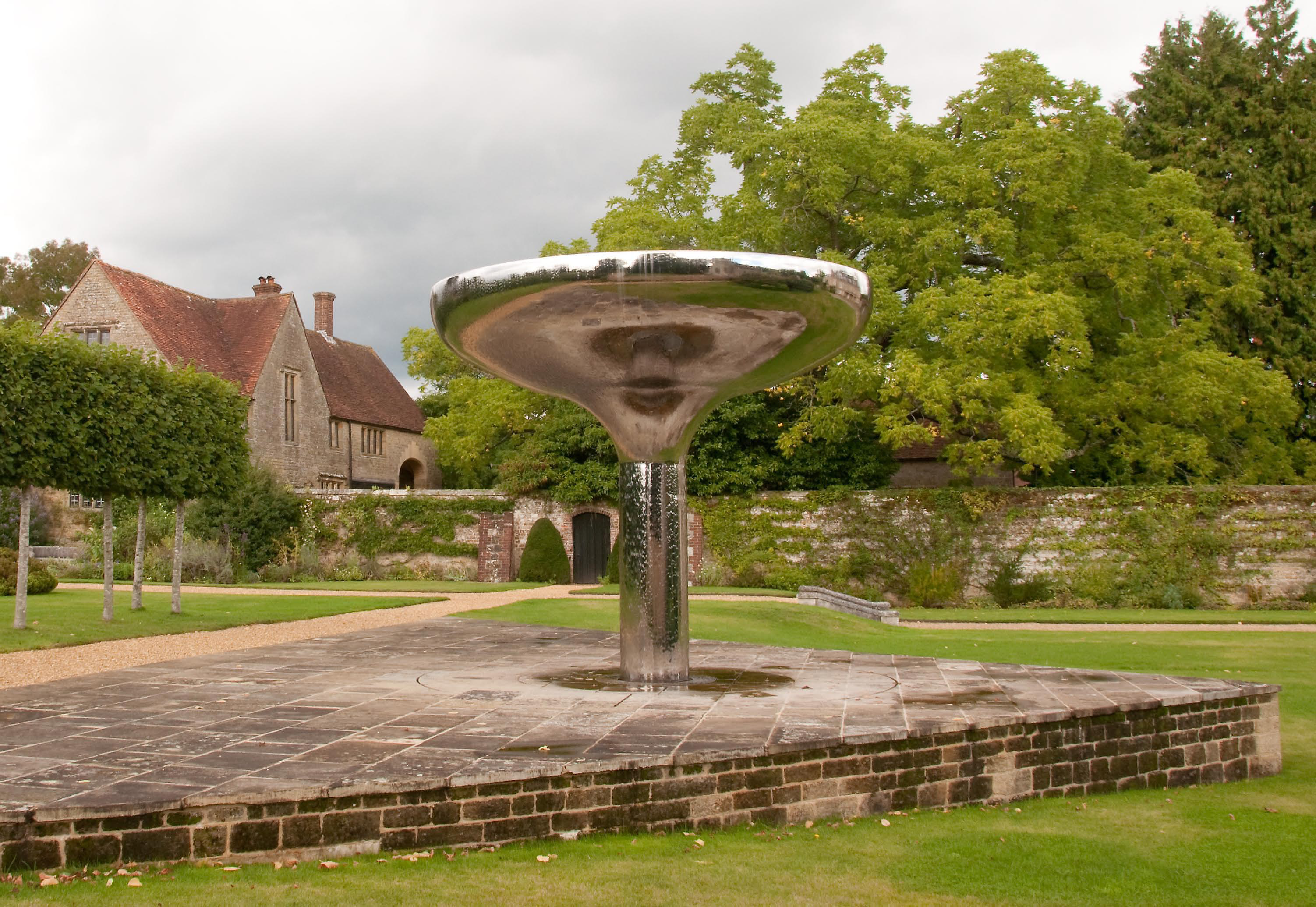
Cedra Fountain

In 1791 the Rev. Sir Charles Mill, 8th Baronet sold the house and estate to Lord Robert Spencer, the youngest son of Charles Spencer, 3rd Duke of Marlborough, who immediately made a number of alterations to the house, including the roofing over of the central courtyard. The house then descended in the Spencer family via his stepdaughter Diana Bouverie to her daughter, who later bequeathed it to the Lascelles family. They in turn handed it over in the late 1940s to the National Trust, although the family continued to live in the house until 1969.

The Woolbeding Estate was leased it to philanthropist and art collector Simon Sainsbury in 1972, and after his death in 2006, his partner Stewart Grimshaw remained in occupation of the house. Sainsbury and Grimshaw started a project to renovate the house and create a series of gardens. The gardens have been open to the public since 2011.

== Woolbeding Gardens ==
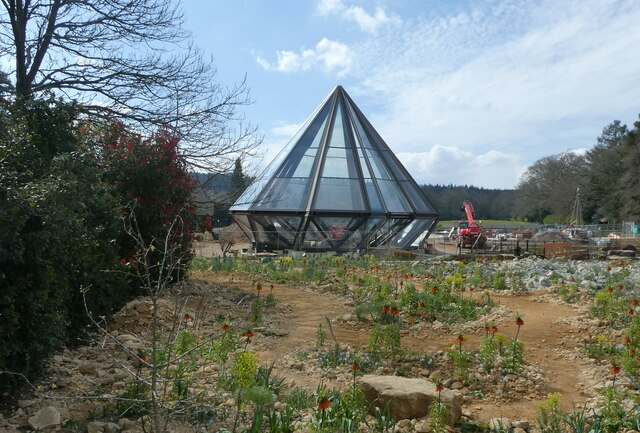
The Glasshouse

Over the past five decades Simon Sainsbury and his partner Stewart Grimshaw collaborated with renowned designers such as Lanning Roper, Julian and Isabel Bannerman, Philip Jebb, and more recently, Thomas Heatherwick to transform Woolbeding Gardens into the horticultural attraction it is today, now open to the public.

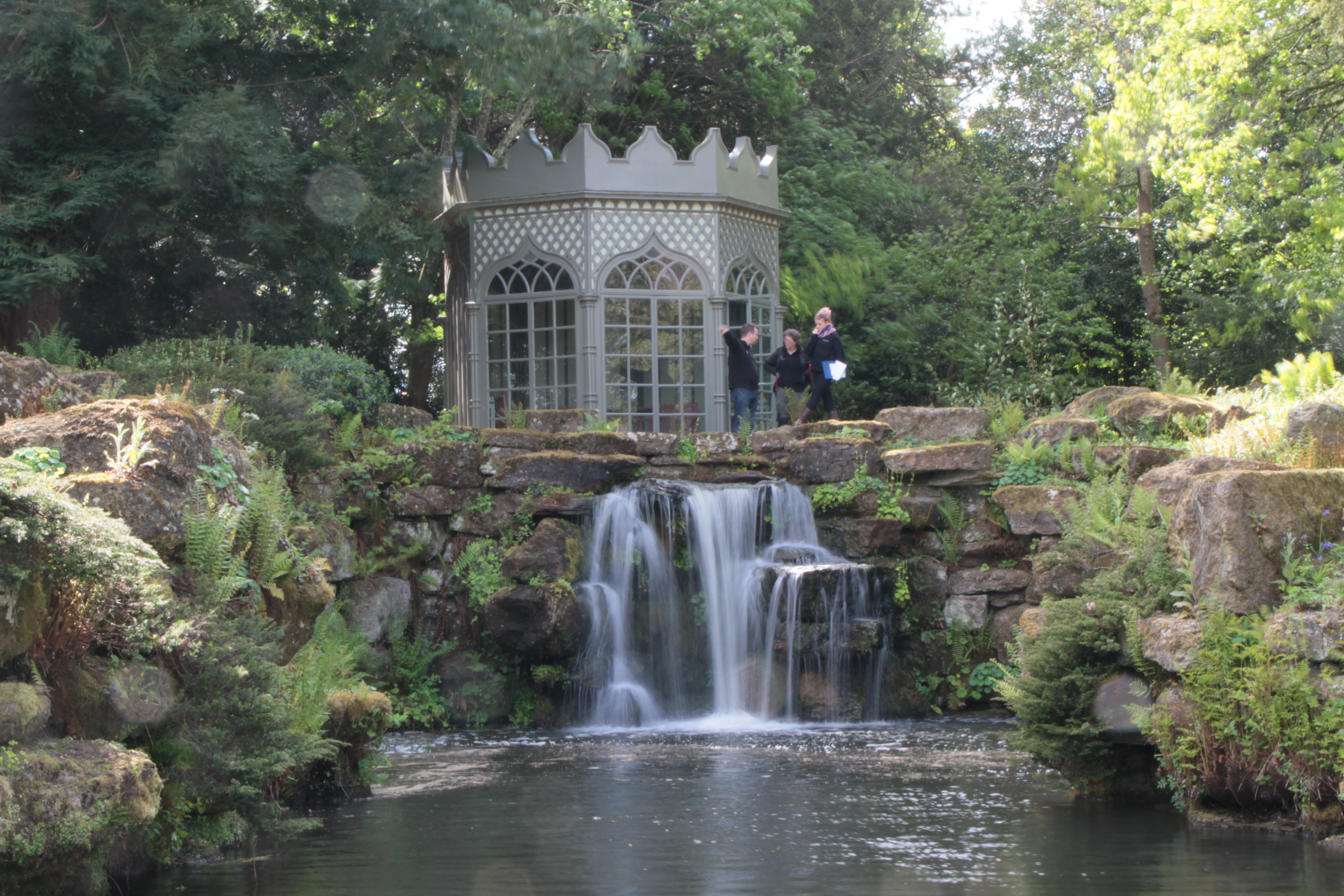
Gothic summerhouse at Woolbeding

Visitors are greeted by the Entrance Garden, which was transformed from what was once the old farmyard. Julian and Isabel Bannerman redesigned this space to feature a dry garden with formal water pools, surrounded by informal perennials and olive trees. The Bannermans also developed the Pleasure Grounds area as well as The Long Walk; a circular route which features follies that lure visitors around the garden. A lake was created out of a swampy ground across the river. A feature in the gardens is the 11-foot tall Cedra fountain by the artist Walter Pye, which stands on the spot once occupied by a cedar tree.

The Glasshouse and Silk Route Garden was designed by Heatherwick Studio for Woolbeding Charity, supported by the National Trust. The ten-sided kinetic glasshouse which can open and close, and the surrounding landscaped garden zones showcase 300 species of plants from twelve distinct regions of the Silk Road.
