= Highgrove House =

Royal residence in Gloucestershire, England

Coordinates: 51°37′23″N 2°10′43″W

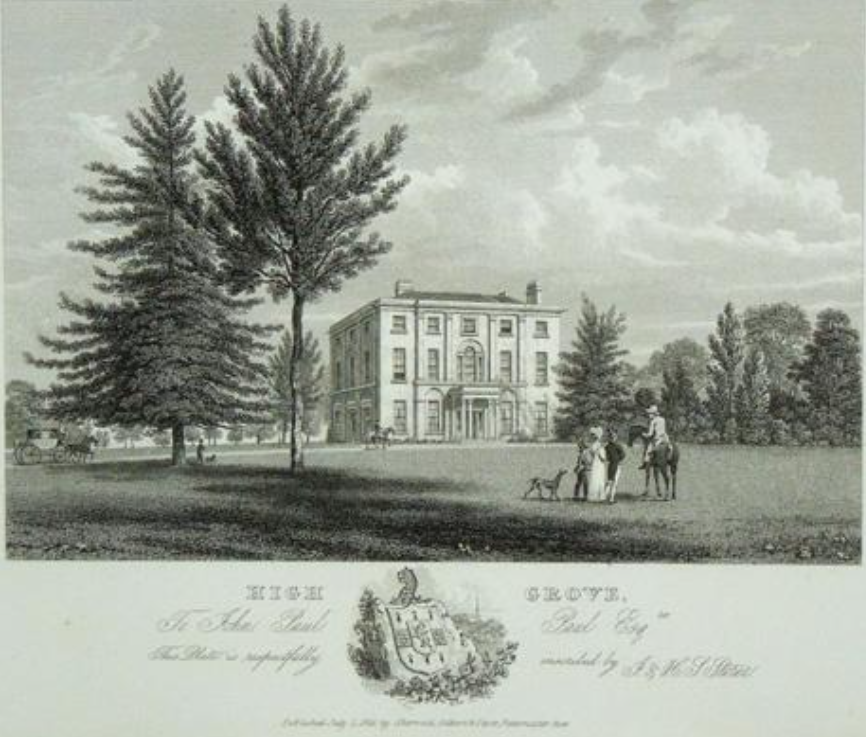
- Engraving of Highgrove by Henry Sargant Storer (1825)

- Location within Gloucestershire

General information
- Type: House
- Location: Doughton, Tetbury Upton, Gloucestershire, England
- Current tenants: The King and Queen
- Owner: Duchy of Cornwall

Listed Building – Grade II
- Official name: Highgrove
- Designated: 21 March 1985
- Reference no.: 1155258

Highgrove House is the family residence of King Charles III and Queen Camilla. It lies southwest of Tetbury in Gloucestershire, England. Built in the late 18th century, Highgrove and its estate were owned by various families until it was purchased in 1980 by the Duchy of Cornwall from Maurice Macmillan. Charles III remodelled the Georgian house with neo-classical additions in 1987. The duchy manages the estate and the nearby Duchy Home Farm.

The gardens at Highgrove have been open to the public since 1996. The gardens of the late-18th-century home were overgrown and untended when Charles first moved in but have since flourished and now include rare trees, flowers and heirloom seeds. Current organic gardening and organic lawn management techniques have allowed the gardens to serve also as a sustainable habitat for birds and wildlife. The gardens were designed by Charles in consultation with highly regarded gardeners such as Rosemary Verey and naturalist Miriam Rothschild.

The gardens receive more than 30,000 visitors a year. The house and gardens are run according to the King's environmental principles and have been the subject of several books and television programmes. The King frequently hosts charitable events at the house.

As the property is owned by the Duchy of Cornwall, control of the House was transferred to William, Prince of Wales, when his father acceded to the throne and he became Duke of Cornwall on 8 September 2022. The King rents the house from the Duchy to use as a country residence.

== Location ==
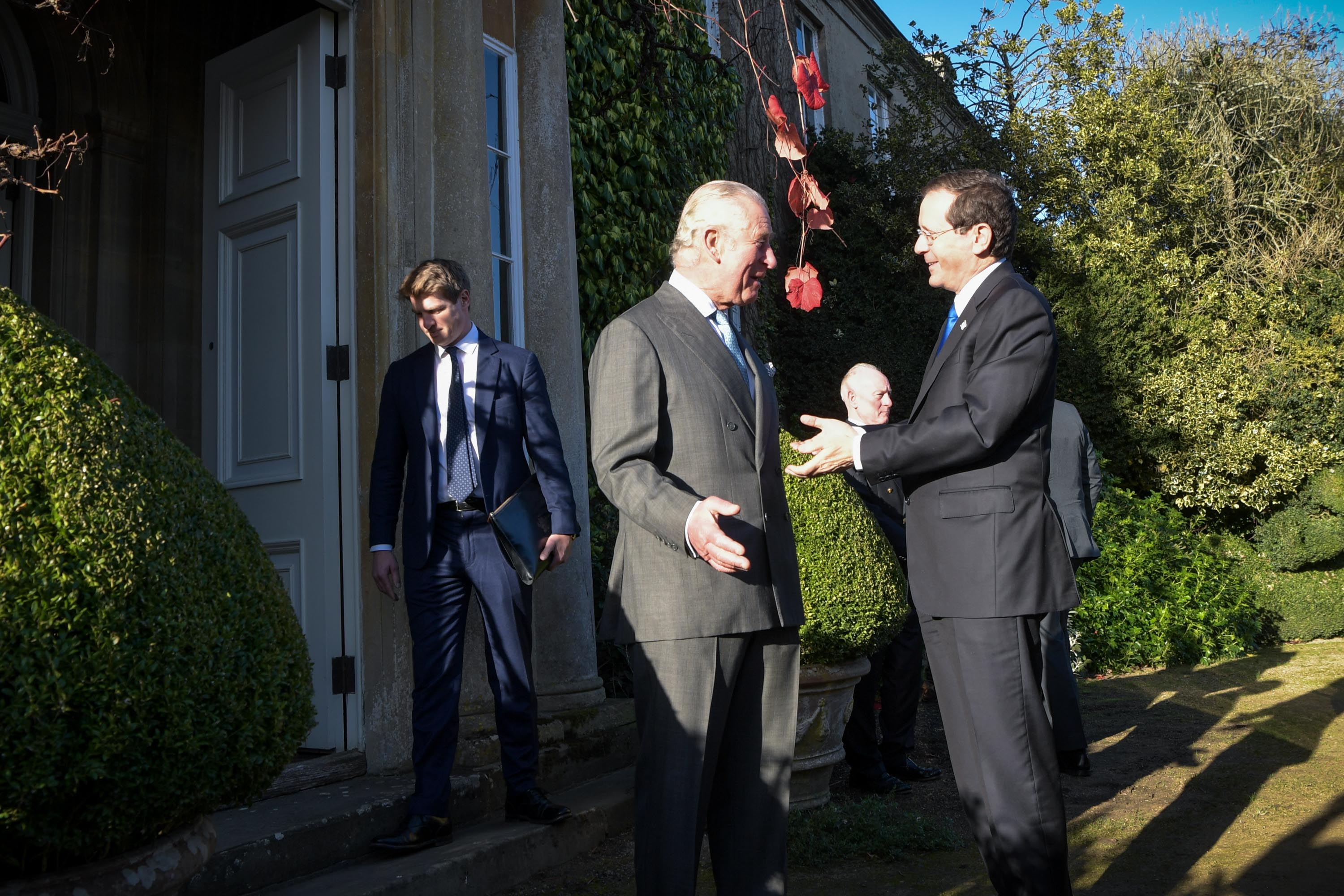
The then Prince of Wales greets President Isaac Herzog of Israel at Highgrove in 2021

Highgrove House is in Doughton in the civil parish of Tetbury Upton, near Tetbury in the county of Gloucestershire in South West England. Gatcombe Park, the country residence of the King's sister, Anne, Princess Royal, is 6 miles (9.7 km) away, between the villages of Minchinhampton and Avening. In addition, the King's cousin, Prince Michael of Kent, bought nearby Nether Lypiatt Manor shortly after the duchy purchased Highgrove, although he sold it in 2006.

As the country residence of the King, Highgrove House is well protected by security. The house is one of several sites designated under the Serious Organised Crime and Police Act 2005 that are protected by law from criminal trespass, a high stone wall surrounds the estate, and in 1983 the duchy and the chief constable of Gloucestershire supported the moving, for security reasons, of two public footpaths that ran close to the house. Several people have been arrested near Highgrove since the King's occupation, including two French journalists and a photographer from The Sun. A 1.5-nautical-mile (2.8 km; 1.7 mi) aerial exclusion zone for civilian aircraft and microlights was imposed over Highgrove in 1991.

== History ==
Highgrove House was built in 1796 to 1798 by John Paul Paul, and is believed to have been designed by architect Anthony Keck. The estate came to the family through the 1771 marriage of Josiah Paul Tippetts, later Paul (his mother's family name, which he adopted under the terms of his uncle's will), and Mary Clark, whose father Robert was the local squire. It belonged to Paul's descendants until 1860. In 1850, his granddaughter Mary Elizabeth Paul died after her gown caught fire during a soiree held for her brother in the ballroom. The house was sold again in 1864 to a barrister, William Yatman. During his time at Highgrove, Yatman was described as one of the "chief preservers of foxes" in an 1872 discussion on the Duke of Beaufort's hounds. He rebuilt the medieval spire of Tetbury Church in memory of his son and paid for the rehanging of the church bells in 1891. Yatman left Highgrove after a fire in 1893 destroyed much of the interior. The house was rebuilt at a cost of £6,000 by Arthur Mitchell, whose son, Lt Col. Francis Mitchell, Commander of the Royal Gloucestershire Hussars, lived at nearby Doughton Manor. The Mitchells sold Highgrove after the Second World War to Lt Col. Gwyn Morgan.

The estate was bought by the Macmillan family in 1956 for £89,000 and was put up for sale by the Conservative Party politician and businessman Maurice Macmillan, the son of former Prime Minister Harold Macmillan, for £730,000 in 1980. Macmillan sold Highgrove so he could spend more time at Birch Grove, his father's home in West Sussex. At the time of its sale Highgrove was described as a "distinguished Georgian house standing in superb parkland in the Duke of Beaufort's hunt" and possessing 347 acres (140 ha), with nine bedrooms and six bathrooms.

In August 1980, the Highgrove estate was purchased by the Duchy of Cornwall for a figure believed to be between £800,000 and £1,000,000, with funds raised by the sale of three properties from the duchy's holdings, including part of the village of Daglingworth. The Duke of Cornwall, now Charles III, was subsequently appointed a tenant for life of Highgrove by the duchy. Upon its purchase, essential repairs were carried out, the interior was stripped, and the rooms were painted white in preparation for their redecoration. The swimming pool at Highgrove was given to the Prince of Wales and Diana, Princess of Wales, as a wedding present from the British Army.

From 1974, the Prince of Wales's previous residence was intended to be Chevening House in Kent, a house for use by a Cabinet member or a descendant of King George VI nominated by the Prime Minister. However, the Prince never occupied the house and renounced his interest in Chevening in 1980. He found the journey from Chevening to Buckingham Palace inconvenient because of traffic congestion in South London, and it was also far from Wales and the Duchy of Cornwall. The estate was run by a board of trustees appointed by the government, which was seen as a disadvantage to any future changes the Prince wished to make. As £1 million of renovations had been made to Chevening before the Prince's occupancy, the purchase of Highgrove was criticised by Labour MP Reg Race, who said that it was "...bloody outrageous on a day that the Government are cutting social security benefits for millions of people". A spokesperson for the duchy said, "It is coincidental that this estate has a house on it which is suitable for the Prince of Wales. The Royal Family are rather short of residences and the prince only has a set of rooms at Buckingham Palace and Windsor Castle that he can use...when you are 31 you want a place of your own".

The Prince of Wales had looked at a number of properties in different counties before the duchy purchased Highgrove. He rejected houses at Stoke Climsland in Cornwall and Orchardleigh in Somerset. He was attracted to Gloucestershire as it was equidistant between London and Cornwall, and he had known the locality around Badminton since his childhood, often hunting with the Duke of Beaufort's Hunt.

The duchy's local holdings were expanded after the purchase of Highgrove, with the addition of Broadfield Farm, a 420-acre (170 ha) farm on the opposite side of Tetbury, and other holdings to a total of 1,112 acres (450 ha) by 1993.

In 1981, model maker Rosalind Hudson made a scale model of Highgrove as a wedding present for the Prince and Princess of Wales. Hudson later altered the model as Highgrove was altered.

Highgrove was initially occupied at weekends by the Prince and Princess of Wales after their 1981 marriage, and their two children, Prince William and Prince Harry, spent much of their childhood at the house.

Two former members of Highgrove's staff, butler Paul Burrell and housekeeper Wendy Berry, have chronicled their time at the house. Burrell's book A Royal Duty was published in 2003 and covers his time at Highgrove from the purchase of the house until his departure with Diana in 1995. Berry's 1995 book The Housekeeper's Diary detailed her time at Highgrove from 1984 to 1993 and was the subject of an injunction from the High Court. After publishing her book in the United States, Berry left the UK to avoid contempt-of-court charges.

In 2020, Charles and Camilla spent Christmas at Highgrove because the traditional Sandringham gathering was cancelled due to Covid-19. The following year, the then Prince of Wales and Duchess of Cornwall spent the COVID-19 lockdown at Highgrove, and it was here that the Prince learnt of the death of his father and paid tribute to him in a televised short statement.

In January 2023, it was reported that the Orchard Tearooms at Highgrove House would be open to the public every Tuesday as part of the Prince's Foundation Gloucestershire Winter Warmers initiative, which was set up to tackle loneliness and isolation in cold weather by providing warm spaces. On 6 May 2023, the newly crowned King and Queen returned to Highgrove House after their coronation. In July 2026, the King and Queen privately hosted Prince Harry and Meghan, along with their children, at Highgrove. This was the first time the King had seen his grandchildren, Archie and Lilibet, since 2022.

== Design ==
The house is a rectangular, detached, three-storey building made from ashlar blocks with a stone and slate roof. Its exterior features neo-classical decoration. In its 1985 listing for the house, English Heritage described its design as: "Principal block, rectangular of five bays by three and of 3 storeys. Pilasters through the upper floors, cornice and parapet. The garden front (south-west) of 5 bays with a central canted bay of 2 storeys. Mid C19. 12-pane sashes. Sashes on south-east set in arched recesses." The house has four reception rooms and nine main bedrooms, with a nursery wing and staff quarters.

In 1893, a fire caused severe damage to the house, and it was rebuilt to its former appearance in 1894 by the Bristol architect John Hart. The fire gutted the interior and damaged the west façade, where a window collapsed onto the terrace, bringing down the wall above. A porch was added to the south-east front in 1894. An office wing to the north-west of the house was demolished in 1966.

At the behest of the then Prince Charles, the artist Felix Kelly created an impression of a remodelled Highgrove with neo-classical additions. Kelly had previously painted a vision of Henbury Hall in Henbury, Cheshire, based on Andrea Palladio's Villa Rotonda. Kelly's artwork formed the basis for the construction of Henbury Hall, and a similar painting of Highgrove subsequently formed the basis for a remodelling of the house in December 1987, undertaken by the architect Peter Falconer. The remodelling saw the exterior embellished with a new balustrade, pediment, and classical pilasters. A new single-storey staff annexe was also added. The additions were praised by the Georgian Group.

Other buildings constructed by the King at Highgrove include beehive pavilions and a beef‑yard designed by Willie Bertram, built in traditional Cotswold stone. Four semi‑detached cottages, dubbed 'the council houses' by the Prince of Wales, were also renovated.

Highgrove House was given Grade II listed status in March 1985. The Coach House to the north-west, and the Lodge and Gate Piers to the east, were also given Grade II listed status.

After the marriage of the then Prince of Wales and Diana, Princess of Wales, in 1981, rooms at Highgrove were decorated by Dudley Poplak, who regarded the commission as the "most important assignment I have ever had." Poplak's obituary in The Times later described his decorations for Highgrove as "...a youthful variant of the chintzy country-house look that was seen everywhere that year..." with a palette of clean fresh colours – plenty of lime green and aquamarine – he created a gentle relaxed mood with no flights of fancy other than the odd experiment with interesting textures". Following Diana's departure from Highgrove, Poplak's designs were replaced with those of Robert Kime at the behest of Camilla.

The King's environmental beliefs have been reflected in changes to Highgrove. Solar panels have been installed on the farm, and the house is heated by a wood-chip boiler. Waste from the house is filtered through a natural sewage system, and the use of aerosols was banned in the 1980s. The lights at Highgrove were turned off for Earth Hour in 2008.

== Gardens ==
The King has created a wild garden, a formal garden and a walled kitchen garden at Highgrove. He has also planted a large number of trees in the grounds and holds the beech collection under the National Plant Collection scheme. Individual features include the Carpet Garden, Southern Hemisphere Garden, Walled Garden, the Autumn Walk, Sundial Garden, and a Woodland Garden featuring two classical temples made from green oak and a stumpery created by Julian and Isabel Bannerman in 1996. The King has described his efforts as representing "...one very small attempt to heal the appalling short-sighted damage done to the soil, the landscape and our own souls" and has written: "Some may not like it, others may scoff that it is not in the 'real world' or it is merely an expensive indulgence. Whatever the case, my enduring hope is that those who visit the garden may find something to inspire, excite, fascinate or soothe them".

In 1980, the then Prince Charles was especially drawn to the 200-year-old Highgrove Cedar of Lebanon to the west of the house. After the diseased tree had to be felled in 2007 for safety reasons, a new oak pavilion with church-like spire was constructed over its base. The organic design by Mark Hoare has a rustic cruck frame on Cotswold staddle stones.

In 1981, the then Prince Charles hired American garden designer Lanning Roper, who had been recommended by Camilla Parker Bowles, to design the gardens, but the project was terminated because Roper died of cancer in 1983. As of 2008, the Head Gardener was Debs Goodenough, who replaced David Howard in July of that year. Charles was initially assisted in his creation of Highgrove's gardens by Miriam Rothschild. He was further assisted by Lady Salisbury, who had restored the gardens of Hatfield House, and Rosemary Verey.

In 1985, organic farming was introduced on three blocks of land as part of a move to what has been described as biologically sustainable farming linked to conservation. Full organic status on the whole estate was completed in 1994.

Pre-booked tours of the gardens are available to individuals and groups between April and mid-October. More than 30,000 people visit the gardens annually.

The gardens inspired the British Composer Patrick Hawes when he was asked to write a piece of music for the then Prince of Wales' 60th birthday in 2008. The resultant piece, Goddess of the Woods, was first performed on the Prince's birthday in the Floral Hall of the Royal Opera House. Three further movements ensued to create the "Highgrove Suite", each depicting different areas of the gardens at Highgrove. The suite was premiered at Highgrove on 8 June 2010 with the royal harpist Claire Jones and the Philharmonia orchestra.

The Highgrove Florilegium is a two-volume book series of botanical illustrations containing 124 watercolours of plants from the gardens. Initially limited to 175 copies, it was published in April 2008.

The Sundial Garden was the first garden at Highgrove to be created by the King and had formerly been known as the South Garden. It is named for the stone sundial at its centre, sculpted by Walter Crang, a wedding present to the then Prince and Princess of Wales from the Duke of Beaufort and outside staff and gardeners. The garden faces south and its layout has remained largely unchanged since its creation. It was originally planted with roses and was briefly planted as a 'black-and-white garden'. It is presently planted with herbaceous plants in pinks, blues, and purples, and is surrounded by a large yew hedge planted in the winter of 1982.

A section of the garden contains busts of people admired by the King, including Debo Devonshire, the composer John Tavener, the naturalist Dame Miriam Rothschild, the poet Kathleen Raine, the activist Vandana Shiva, and the Bishop of London, Richard Chartres. Other people honoured by busts in the garden include the former museum director and art historian Sir Roy Strong, who helped design the Highgrove gardens, and Léon Krier, who created Poundbury, a village built to the Prince of Wales's architectural principles in Dorset. Busts of the former owner of Highgrove, Maurice Macmillan (sculpted by Angela Conner), the explorer and confidant of the then Prince of Wales, Sir Laurens van der Post (sculptured by Frances Baruch), and the pilot and psychiatrist Alan McGlashan are displayed in Highgrove's Cottage Garden, in recesses in a yew hedge. A path of stone cobbles leaves the Cottage Garden before surrounding a stone obelisk inscribed with 'York, Weymouth and Bath', given to the then Prince of Wales for his 60th birthday by stone-masonry colleges.

In July 2025, after interviews with eight staff members, The Times reported that of 12 full-time gardeners employed in 2022, 11 had left their posts. An external investigation was launched by the King's Foundation, which found evidence of "staff shortages" and "poor" management practice. Some staff being on minimum wage was also described as an "issue for recruitment and retention". The report concluded that "management training" was required for all managers, and "mental health support and counselling" and a pay review needed to be set up. The estate also removed the positions of "head of gardens" and "deputy head gardener", limiting the principal role to a single position called "head gardener".

== Highgrove shops ==
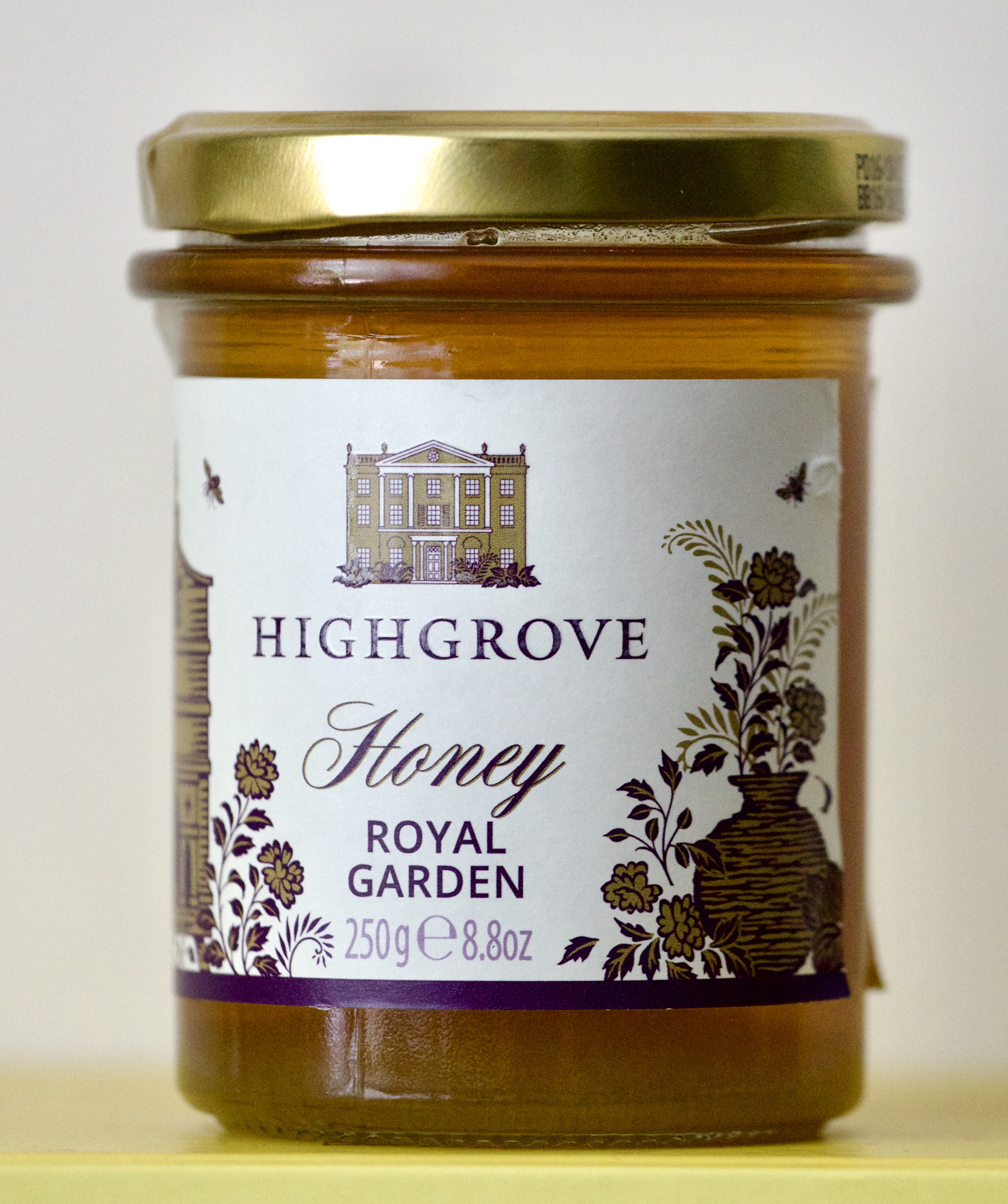
Jar of Highgrove honey

In 1992, the then Prince of Wales opened the Highgrove retail shops, which sell products, including Duchy Originals, for home and garden. The shops are located in Tetbury and in London, where the products are available at Fortnum & Mason. A shop in Bath closed down in 2014. All profits from the sale of the products have been paid to The Prince of Wales's Charitable Foundation and later to The King's Foundation. In 2014, the shops began selling products online.

== See also ==
- Birkhall, a house in Aberdeenshire, Scotland, inherited by the King from Queen Elizabeth The Queen Mother.
- Llwynywermod, purchased by the Duchy of Cornwall in 2006 as a residence for the Prince of Wales in Wales.
- Dumfries House, a house in East Ayrshire, Scotland, owned by The King's Foundation.
- Tamarisk, a house on the Isles of Scilly owned by the Duchy of Cornwall.
