= Isabel Bannerman =

British garden designer and author

Isabel Bannerman (born 14 March 1962) is a British garden designer and writer, known for her work in restoring historical gardens and creating new ones. Her portfolio features award-winning projects, including the gardens at Highgrove House, the private residence of King Charles III.

== Career ==
After buying a semi derelict Wiltshire mansion called The Ivy and exploring their mutual passion for building restoration and garden design, Isabel and her husband Julian Bannerman were invited to join a team building a modern grotto under a work by British sculptor Simon Verity at Leeds Castle. This led to their first major commission from Jacob Rothschild at Waddesdon Manor where they re-purposed the Dairy Buildings into an office and venue and restored the water and rock gardens at the Dairy. Their work on this project was highly acclaimed, receiving both Civic Trust and Europa Nostra awards.

The Bannerman's founded their own garden design firm, I & J Bannerman Ltd. in 1991, which has since become known for its garden designs. They were commissioned to design a stumpery at Highgrove House by King Charles in the late 1990s.

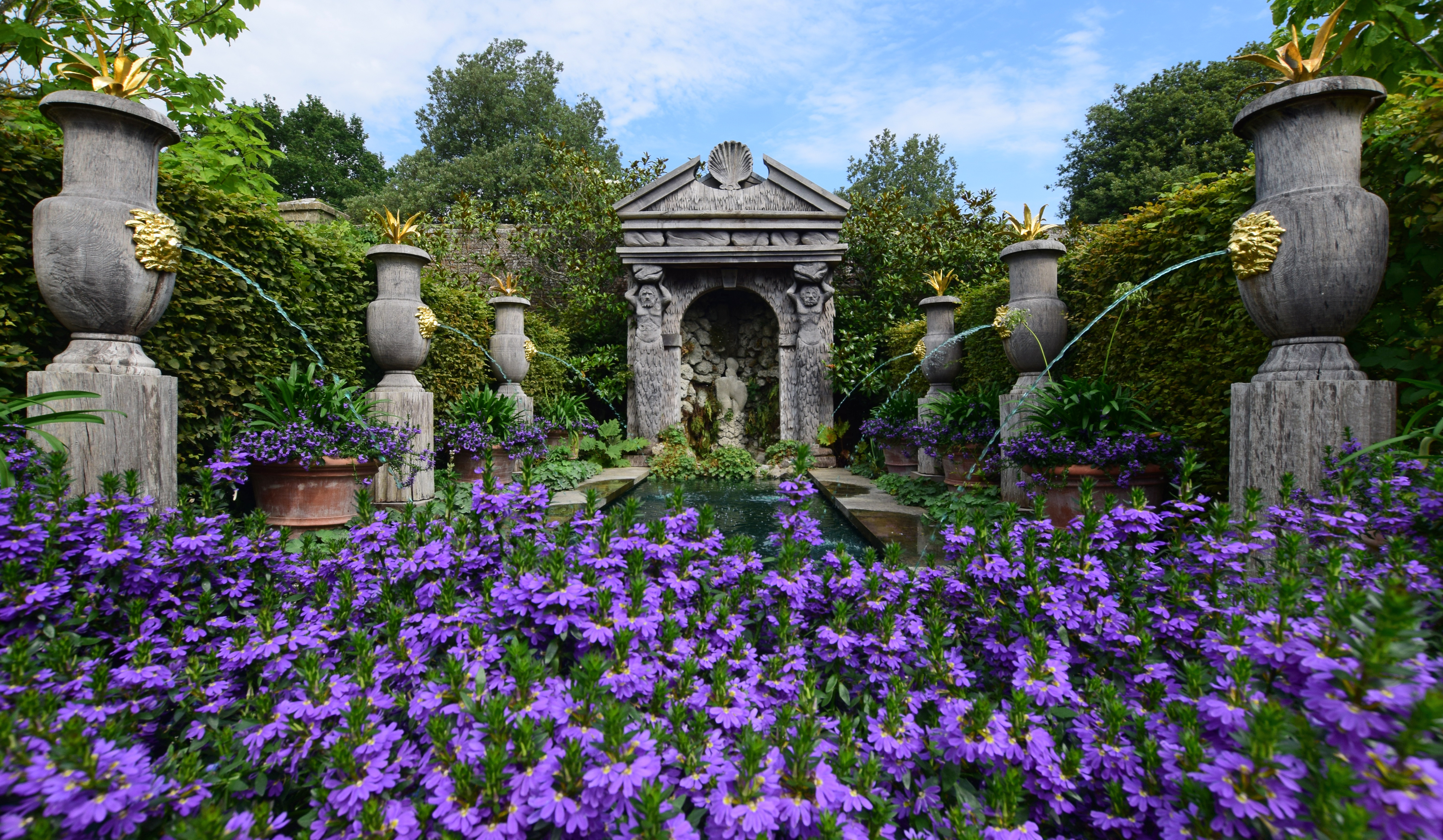
The Collector's Earl Garden at Arundel Castle

In 1993 the Bannermans sold The Ivy and relocated to Hanham Court. There, they restored the court and established a garden open to the public. Simon Sainsbury and Stewart Grimshaw enlisted the Bannermans in 2000 to redesign the Entrance Garden and Pleasure Grounds area, as well as enhance the Long Walk at Woolbeding House in Sussex. John Robinson founder of Jigsaw later commissioned them in 2001 to design and develop the garden at Euridge Manor Farm in Wiltshire, where they also designed and built the modern medieval abbey where the garden is set. It is now a venue for weddings and events.

The Bannermans were subsequently commissioned by the Duke and Duchess of Norfolk to create "The Collector Earl’s Garden" at Arundel Castle in Sussex. Another award-winning project was their restoration of the five-acre walled garden at Houghton Hall, owned by the Marquess of Cholmondeley. In 2010 the Bannermans completed the Queen Elizabeth II September 11th Garden, located in Hanover Square in the Financial District of New York City, after receiving an invitation to enter a competition to create the design. The garden commemorates the 67 British victims of the 11 September 2001 attack on the World Trade Center. Queen Elizabeth II attended the opening on 6 July 2010.

The couple then moved on to Trematon Castle in 2012, leased from the Duchy of Cornwall, where they created another garden that featured a medieval keep. The duo also designed the garden at Wormsley Park, Buckinghamshire for John Paul Getty II and have played a major role in redesigning the gardens of Dumfries House in Ayrshire. The Bannermans moved to Ashington Manor in Somerset in 2019, where they are renovating and enhancing the property with a newly established garden and orchards.

Throughout the years of their career Isabel and Julian have been invited to participate as speakers in various gardening and literary festivals, including The Chalke Valley History Festival, The Garden Museum Literary Festival, Charleston Festival of the Garden, Dartington Hall Ways with Words and at the New York Botanical Garden.

== Awards and honours ==
- 1992 Europa Nostra Heritage Award for Waddesdon Manor
- 1993 Civic Trust Award for Waddesdon Manor
- 1994 Gold Medal at the RHS Chelsea Flower Show
- 1997 Royal Warrant awarded by the Prince of Wales
- 2007 Christie's Garden of the Year Award for Houghton Hall.
- 2008 Carpenters Guild Award for Arundel Castle Collector Earl’s Garden

== Publications ==
Isabel Bannerman is a published author, having co-written several books with her husband, including Landscape of Dreams: The Gardens of Isabel and Julian Bannerman (2016), which features a foreword from the then HRH Prince of Wales, followed by Scent Magic: Notes from a Gardener (2019) and Husbandry: Making Gardens with Mr. B (2021). All three books were featured in The Sunday Times ‘Gardening Books of the Year’ list.

Bannerman has written for publications such as The Telegraph, The Sunday Times, Gardens Illustrated, and House and Garden Magazine.

== Personal life ==
Bannerman grew up in London. She met Julian in Edinburgh, Scotland where she was studying history and history of art at Edinburgh University.
