= Stumpery =

Garden feature made from parts of dead trees

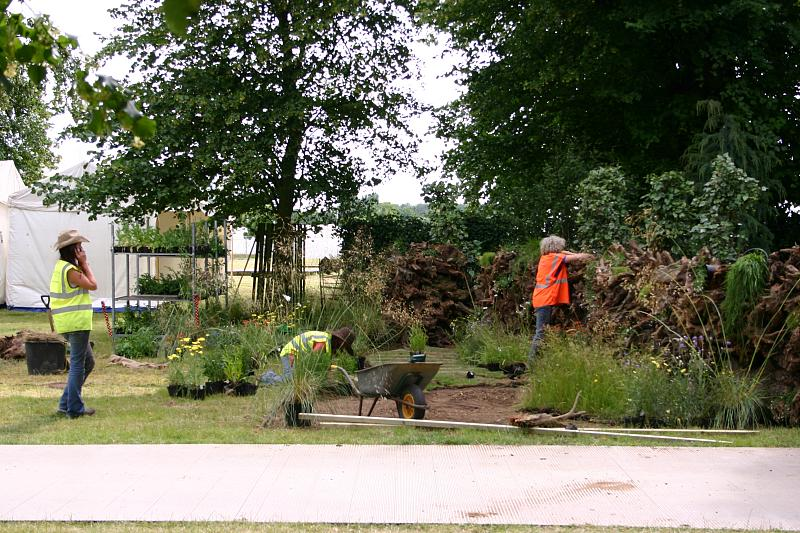
A stumpery under construction for the Hampton Court Flower Show

A stumpery is a garden feature similar to a rockery but made from parts of dead trees. This can take the form of whole stumps, logs, pieces of bark or even worked timber such as railway sleepers or floorboards. The pieces are arranged artistically and plants, typically ferns, mosses and lichens are encouraged to grow around or on them. They provide a feature for the garden and a habitat for several types of wildlife. The first stumpery was built in 1856 at Biddulph Grange and they remained popular in Victorian Britain.

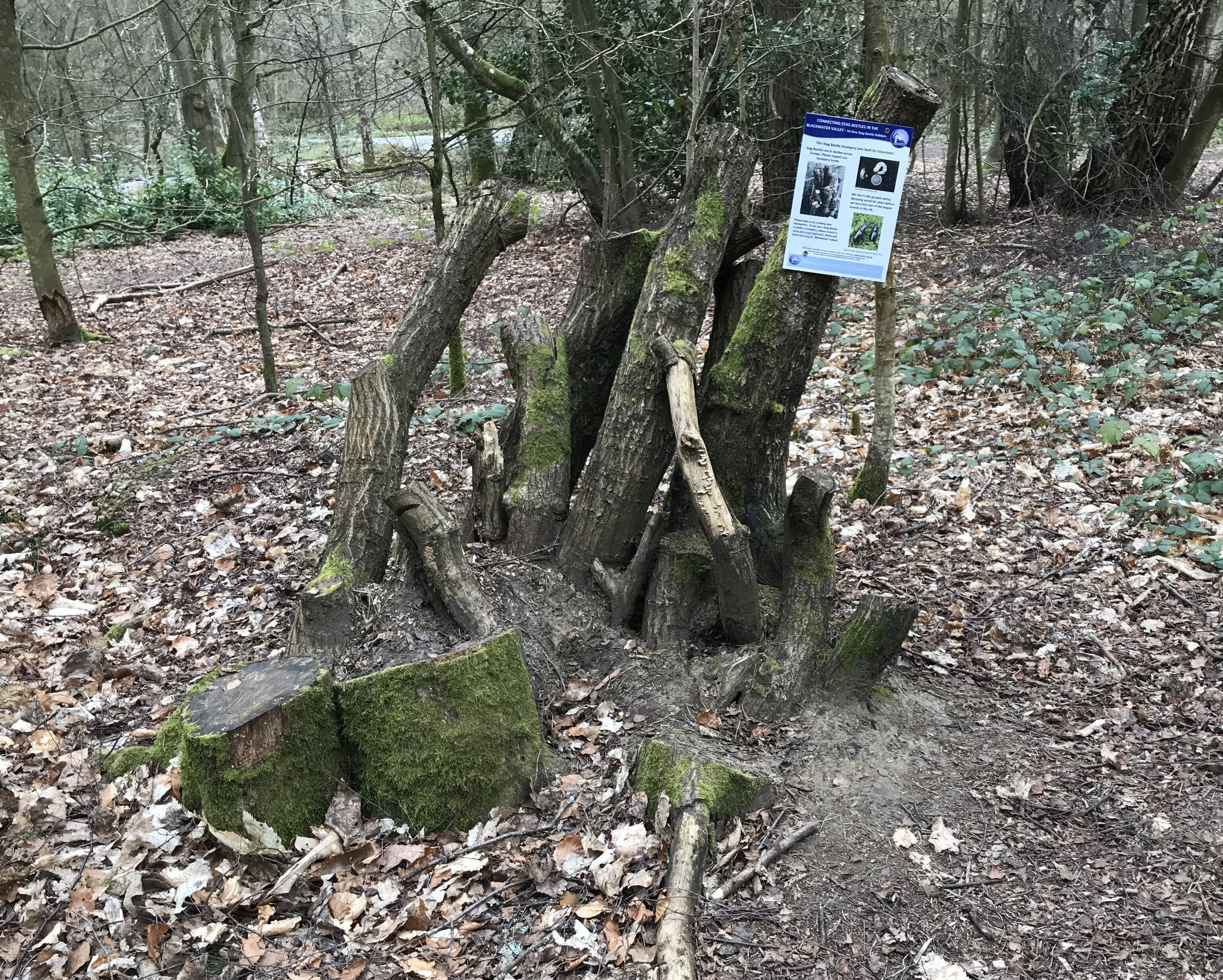
Stag Beetle stumpery at Aldershot in Hampshire

A stumpery traditionally consists of tree stumps arranged upside-down or on their sides to show the root structure but logs, driftwood or large pieces of bark can also be used. The stumps can be used individually or attached together to form a structure such as a wall or arch. Stumperies can vary in size from a handful of logs to large displays containing dozens of full tree stumps. The use of storm-damaged or diseased trees is not uncommon and can save the landowner the cost of their removal. Where tree stumps are unavailable a more modern, angular look can be achieved by using railway sleepers or old oak floorboards and some companies sell waste timber or driftwood specifically for the purpose of constructing stumperies. Plants such as ferns, mosses and lichens are often encouraged to grow around and on the stumpery. Stumperies provide a home for wildlife and have been known to host stag beetles, toads and small mammals.

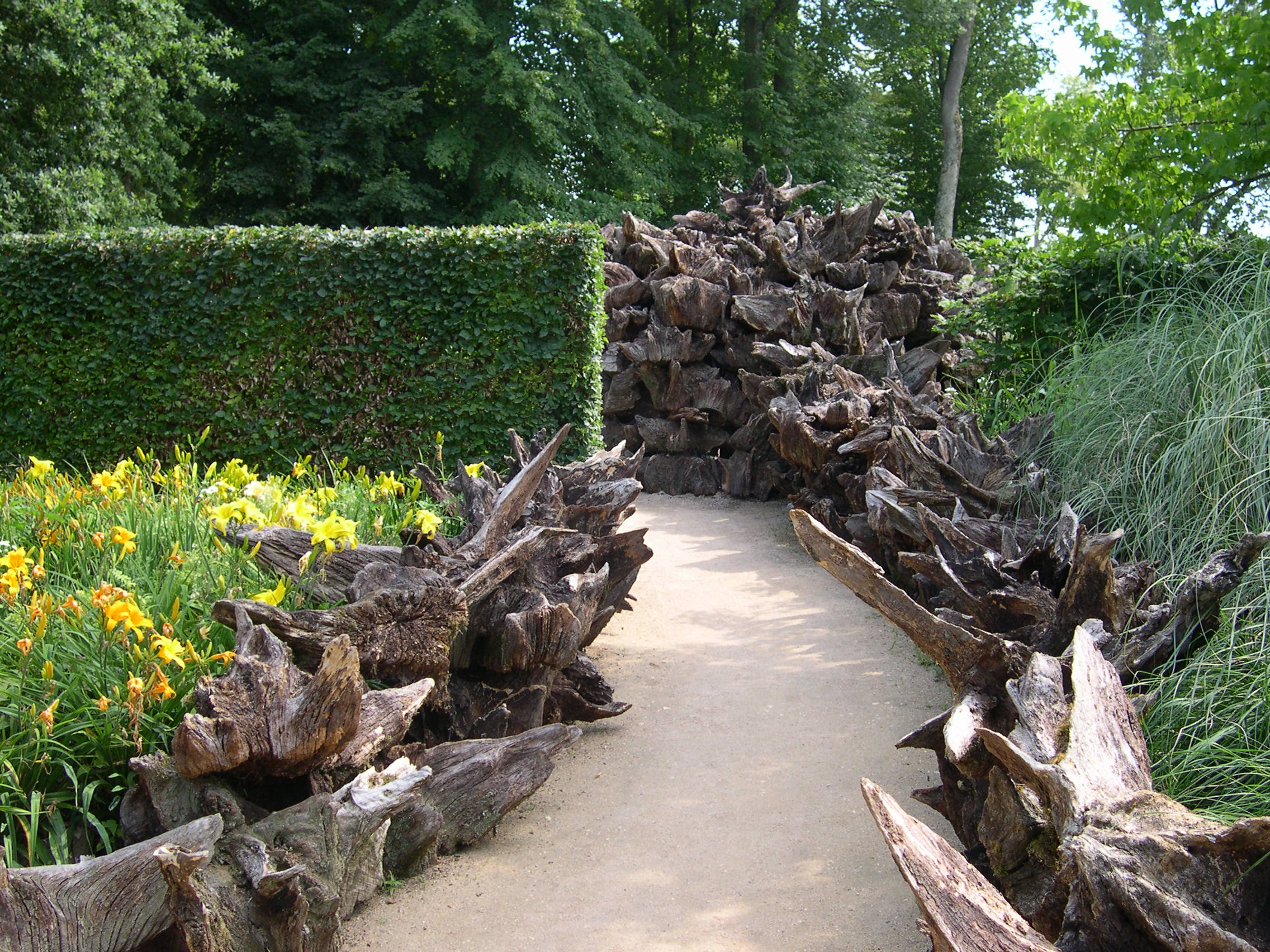
Part of the stumpery at the Château de Chaumont, central France

Stumperies have been described as "Victorian horticultural oddities" and were popular features of 19th-century gardens. The reasons for their popularity vary but it may be a result of the Romantic Movement which emphasised the beauty of nature. Their popularity may also be attributed to the increasing popularity of ferns as garden plants at the time. Ferns were very fashionable and hundreds of new species were introduced to Britain from around the world. The stumpery made an ideal habitat for these shade-loving plants. Additionally stumperies may have been used in place of rockeries in areas where suitable rocks were in short supply. Their popularity is once again on the rise.

The first stumpery to be built, at Biddulph Grange, Staffordshire, in 1856, was designed by the artist and gardener Edward William Cooke for the estate's owner James Bateman. The stumpery at Biddulph Grange consists of stumps placed into a 10 feet (3.0 m) wall either side of a garden path and used as a scaffold for the growth of ferns. A famous modern stumpery is that at Highgrove House, Gloucestershire, the home of King Charles III, designed and built by Isabel and Julian Bannerman in 1996, which is considered to be the largest stumpery in Britain. Charles built the stumpery from sweet chestnut roots, held in place by steel bars, when he first purchased the estate in 1980, and it now provides a home for organically grown ferns, hellebores and hostas. The largest stumpery in the United States is at Vashon Island in Washington. It rivals the Highgrove stumpery in size, measuring 9,000 square feet (840 m^{2}), and includes around 95 separate tree stumps. Stumperies can sometimes be mistaken for garden rubbish; indeed, when Prince Philip first saw his son's stumpery, he remarked: "When are you going to set fire to this lot?".
