= Dudley Poplak =

British interior designer (1930–2005)

Dudley Poplak (15 April 1930 – 19 February 2005) was a British interior decorator that frequently worked for the royal family and other members of nobility.

One of his most famous projects was his 1981 refurbishment of the interior of Highgrove House as a wedding gift for Princess Diana and Prince Charles.

== Career ==
Born on 15 April 1930 in South Africa, Poplak moved to the United Kingdom in 1959 and soon after received his British citizenship. The time period of his arrival saw interior design still in a dormant stage after the impact of World War II and his understanding of the needs and desires of his upper class patrons in the UK resulted in a large amount of prestige being given to him over other designers.

Poplak first became known to the general public in the 1969 documentary The Royal Family where his work on refurbishing Winfield House for the US Ambassador to Britain at the time, Walter Annenberg, was prominently featured. He also continued working on cultivating professional relationships with manufacturers, such as lampshade maker Betty Hanley and a larger group of potential patrons, such as Frances Shand Kydd whom Hanley introduced him to. It was the latter contact that caused him to be commissioned by Kydd in 1981 to work on refurbishment of Highgrove House.

During the rest of the 1980s from 1983 onward, he continued to provide additional renovations for Winfield House for the new US Ambassador to Britain, Charles H. Price II. Further renovations would be done by Poplak on the house in the 2000s. Even after Charles Price and his wife retired from the position and returned to the United States, Poplak would visit their home in Kansas City at least fifteen times to work on their private home.

While Poplak officially retired from being an interior designer in the 1990s, he still provided design work for select clients including the Prices and Prince Charles until his death on 19 February 2005.

== Personal life ==
In 1964, Poplak chose to purchase a bungalow referred to as The Folly that was built in 1846 in Burrough Green, Cambridgeshire; he converted it into his weekend home with a design focusing around an Asian aesthetic.
