= Arundel Castle =

Castle in West Sussex, England

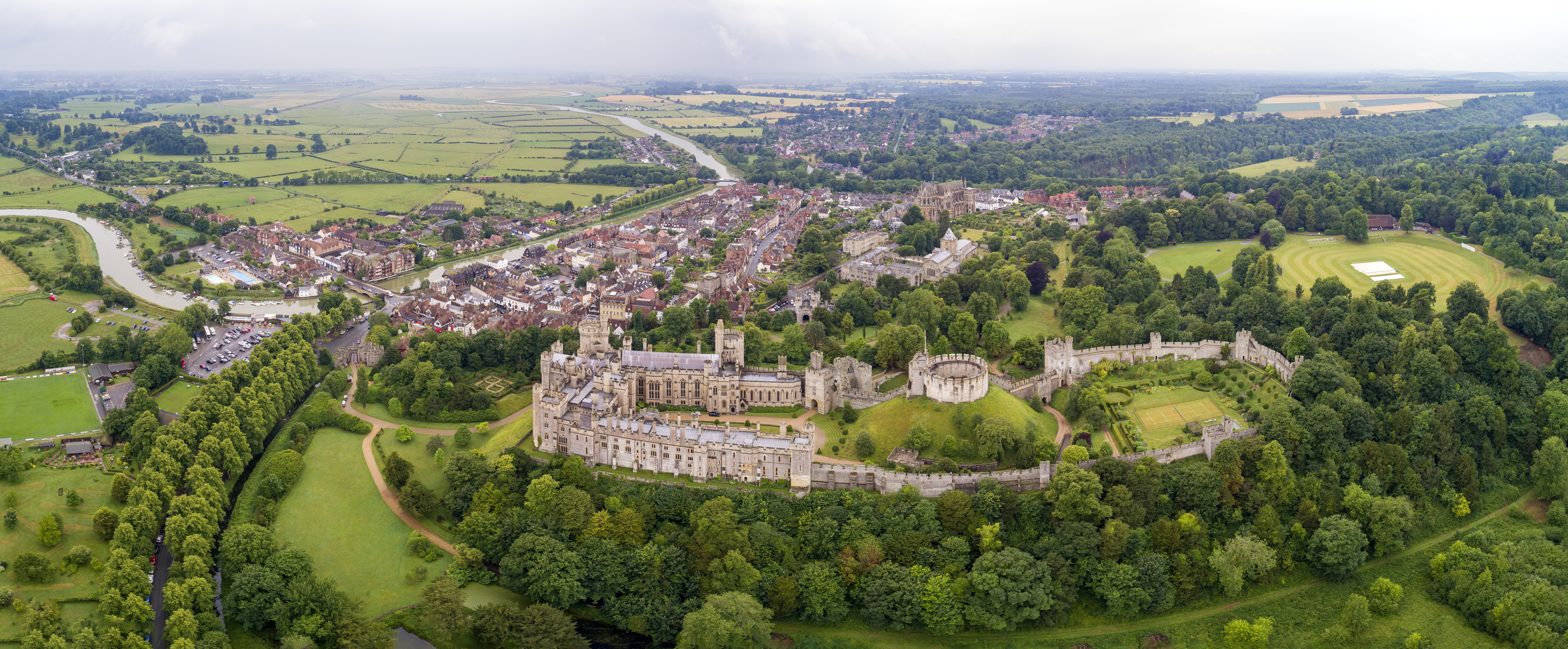
- Aerial panorama of the castle and its surroundings

General information
- Location: Arundel, West Sussex, England
- Coordinates: 50°51′22″N 0°33′13″W
- Owner: Duke of Norfolk

Website
- arundelcastle.org

Listed Building – Grade I
- Designated: 26 March 1949
- Reference no.: 1027926

Arundel Castle is a restored and remodelled medieval castle in Arundel, West Sussex, England. It was established by Roger de Montgomery in the 11th century. The castle was damaged in the English Civil War and then restored in the late 18th and early 19th centuries by the 11th Duke of Norfolk. Further restoration and embellishment was undertaken from the 1890s by Charles Alban Buckler for the 15th Duke.

Since the 11th century, the castle has been the seat of the Earls of Arundel and the Dukes of Norfolk. It is a Grade I listed building.

== History ==
Arms of the Duke of Norfolk

The original structure was a motte-and-bailey castle. Roger de Montgomery was declared the first Earl of Arundel as the King granted him the property as part of a much larger honour of hundreds of manors. Roger, who was a cousin of William the Conqueror, had stayed in Normandy to keep the peace there while William was away in England. He was rewarded for his loyalty with extensive lands in the Welsh Marches and across the country, together with one fifth of Sussex (Arundel Rape). He began work on Arundel Castle in around 1067.

Between 1101 and 1102 the castle was besieged by the forces of Henry I after its holder Robert of Bellême rebelled. The siege ended with the castle surrendering to the king. The castle then passed to Henry I's widow Adeliza of Louvain and her second husband William d'Aubigny. Adeliza and William hosted Adeliza's stepdaughter Empress Matilda in the castle in 1139, during the early years of the Anarchy.

Adeliza died in 1151, and William died in 1176. The castle then passed down the d'Aubigny line until the death of Hugh, 5th Earl of Arundel, in 1243. John Fitzalan then inherited jure matris the castle and honour of Arundel, by which, according to Henry VI's "admission" of 1433, he was later retrospectively held to have become de jure Earl of Arundel.

The FitzAlan male line ceased on the death of Henry, 12th Earl of Arundel, whose daughter and heiress, Lady Mary FitzAlan, married the 4th Duke of Norfolk in 1555, to whose descendants the castle and earldom passed.

In 1643, during the First English Civil War, the castle was besieged. The 800 royalists inside surrendered after 18 days. Afterwards, in 1653, Parliament ordered the slighting of the castle; however, "weather probably destroyed more".

Although the castle remained in the hands of the Howard family over the succeeding centuries, it was not their favourite residence, and the various Dukes of Norfolk invested their time and energy into improving other ducal estates, including Norfolk House in London. The 11th Duke of Norfolk was known for his restoration work and improvements to the castle, beginning in 1787. The folly that still stands on the hill above Swanbourne Lake was commissioned by and built for the 11th Duke by Francis Hiorne at this time.

Some stained glass was supplied by William Raphael Eginton. Circa 1816, he described it thus:

3 Portraits of Barons, full length, of the time of King John, in Baronial Hall, at Arundel Castle.

In 1846, Queen Victoria and her husband, Prince Albert, visited Arundel Castle for three days. The 13th Duke of Norfolk internally remodelled the castle in time for her visit. The architectural firm responsible for design of the furniture was named Morant. The work included a suite of six rooms, built on the second floor of the south-east range at this time.

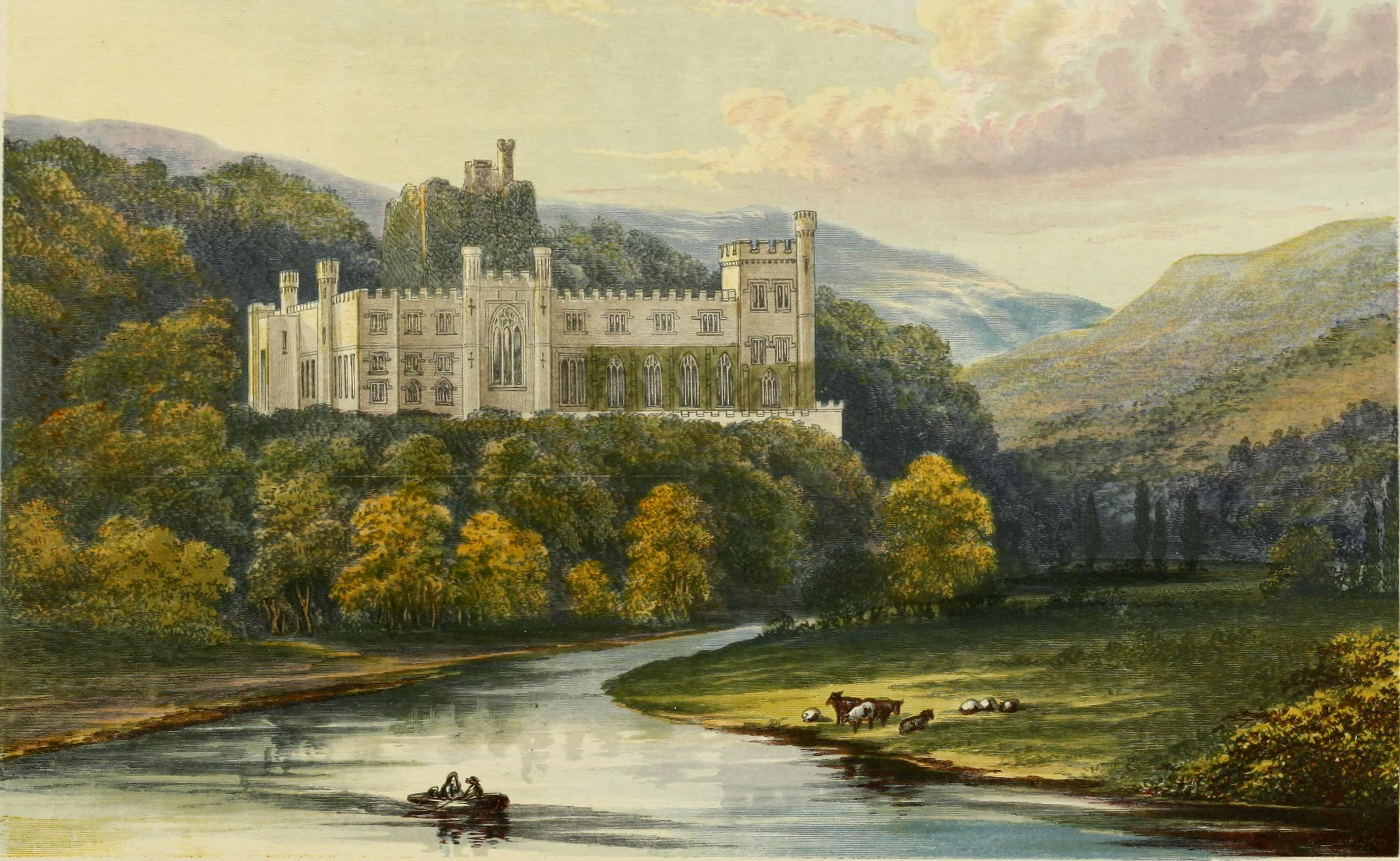
The 19th-century embellishments had not been completed when this picture was published in 1880.

After the 1846 royal visit the 15th Duke began re-structuring the castle again from 1875 to 1905. The work, which was done to the designs of Charles Alban Buckler and undertaken by Rattee and Kett of Cambridge, was completed in the late 19th century. The 16th Duke had planned to give the castle to the National Trust but, following his death in 1975, the 17th Duke cancelled the plan. He created an independent charitable trust to guarantee the castle's future, and oversaw restoration works.

The gardens had received significant improvements by early 2020 through the efforts of head gardener Martin Duncan and his crew. A horticulturalist and landscape designer, Duncan has been working at the Castle since 2009; in 2018, he received the Kew Guild Medal. The gardeners and volunteers "have worked wonders with their bold and innovative plantings", according to an April 2020 report by Country Life. Their most recent efforts led to a wild water garden around the medieval friary ponds.

== The Collector's Earl Garden ==
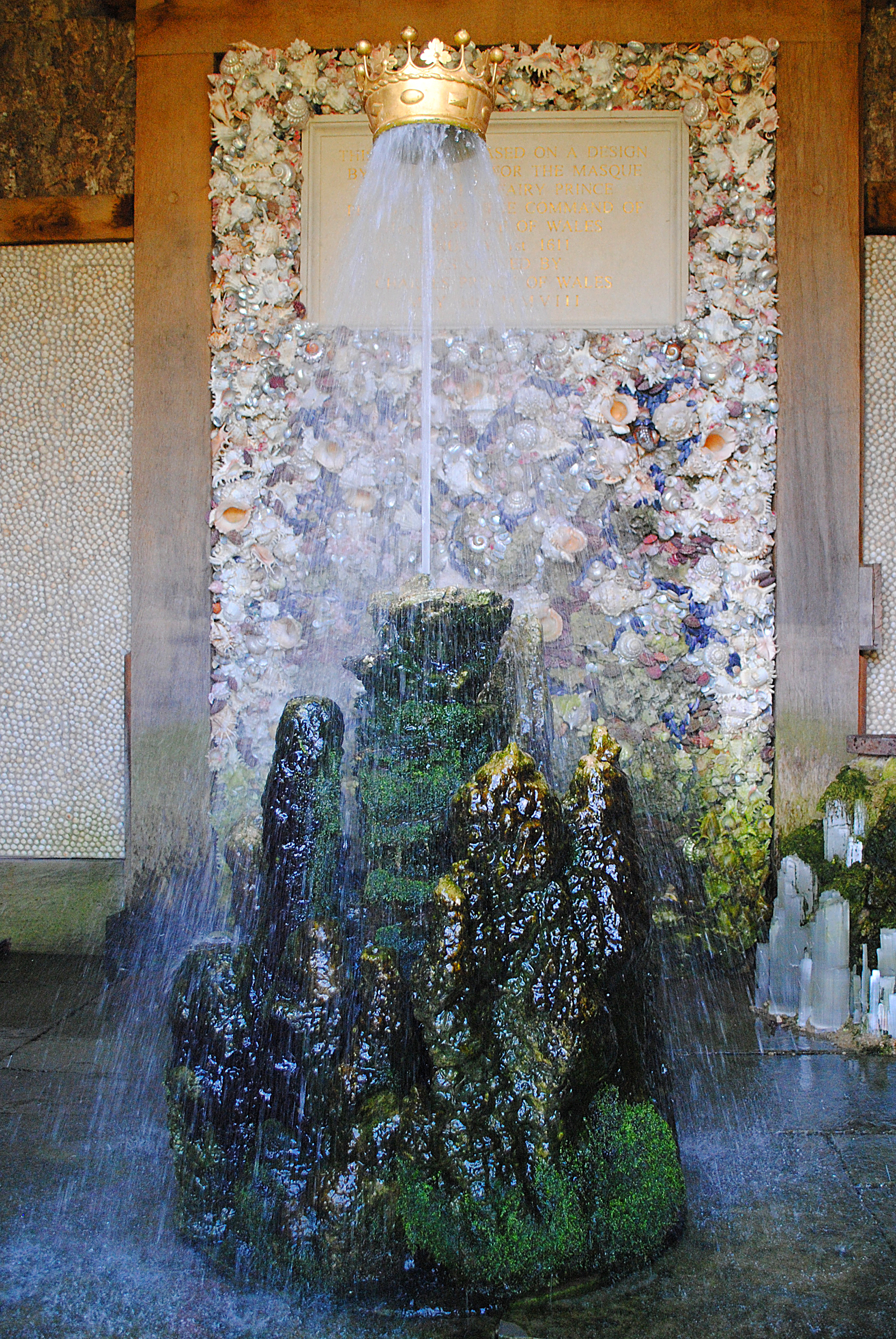
The dancing crown fountain inside Oberon’s Palace at Collector Earl’s Garden, Arundel Castle

Designed by Isabel and Julian Bannerman, The Collector's Earl Garden was opened in 2008 by Charles, Prince of Wales, as a tribute to the 14th Earl of Arundel, known as ‘The Collector Earl’. The garden's centrepiece, Oberon's Palace, is a pavilion that features a shellwork grotto and a fountain that supports a golden corona when the water spurts.

== Cricket ==
The cricket ground in the castle grounds has, since 1895, seen matches involving teams from local youths to international sides.

== Other events ==
- On 14 October 1651, Captain Morley, who held the Castle for Parliament, while out hunting, almost captured Charles II and Colonel Phillips. Charles II was on the run for his life at the time, fleeing from the Royalist defeat at Worcester. His party managed to just stay clear of Morley's party by dismounting as if to descend the hill more easily, thereby letting Morley's group run past them. (See Gounter, Last Act, p. 12).
- The visit of Queen Victoria and Prince Albert (1846)
- The opening of the Collector Earl's Garden 14 May 2008 by Charles, then Prince of Wales.
- On Friday 21 May 2021 there was a break-in. A set of "irreplaceable" gold rosary beads carried by Mary, Queen of Scots, to her execution in 1587 were among items stolen. Other items taken included coronation cups given by monarchs to the Earl Marshal.

== Filming location ==
Arundel Castle has been used as a filming location for several television and film productions. The BBC filmed extensively at the castle and its grounds in 1988 for the Doctor Who serial Silver Nemesis, where it doubled for Windsor Castle. It also doubled for Windsor Castle in the 1994 film The Madness of King George. Arundel Castle was also a location for the 2009 film The Young Victoria, and the 2017 film Wonder Woman.

== In literature ==
In Thomas Malory's epic Morte D'Arthur, Arundel Castle is the castle of Anglides, the mother of Alisander le Orphelin.

== Gallery ==
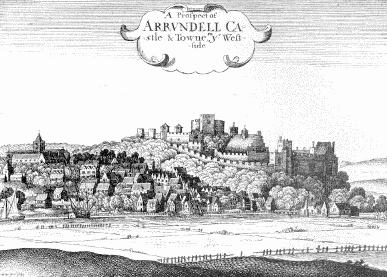
Arundel Castle and town in 1644

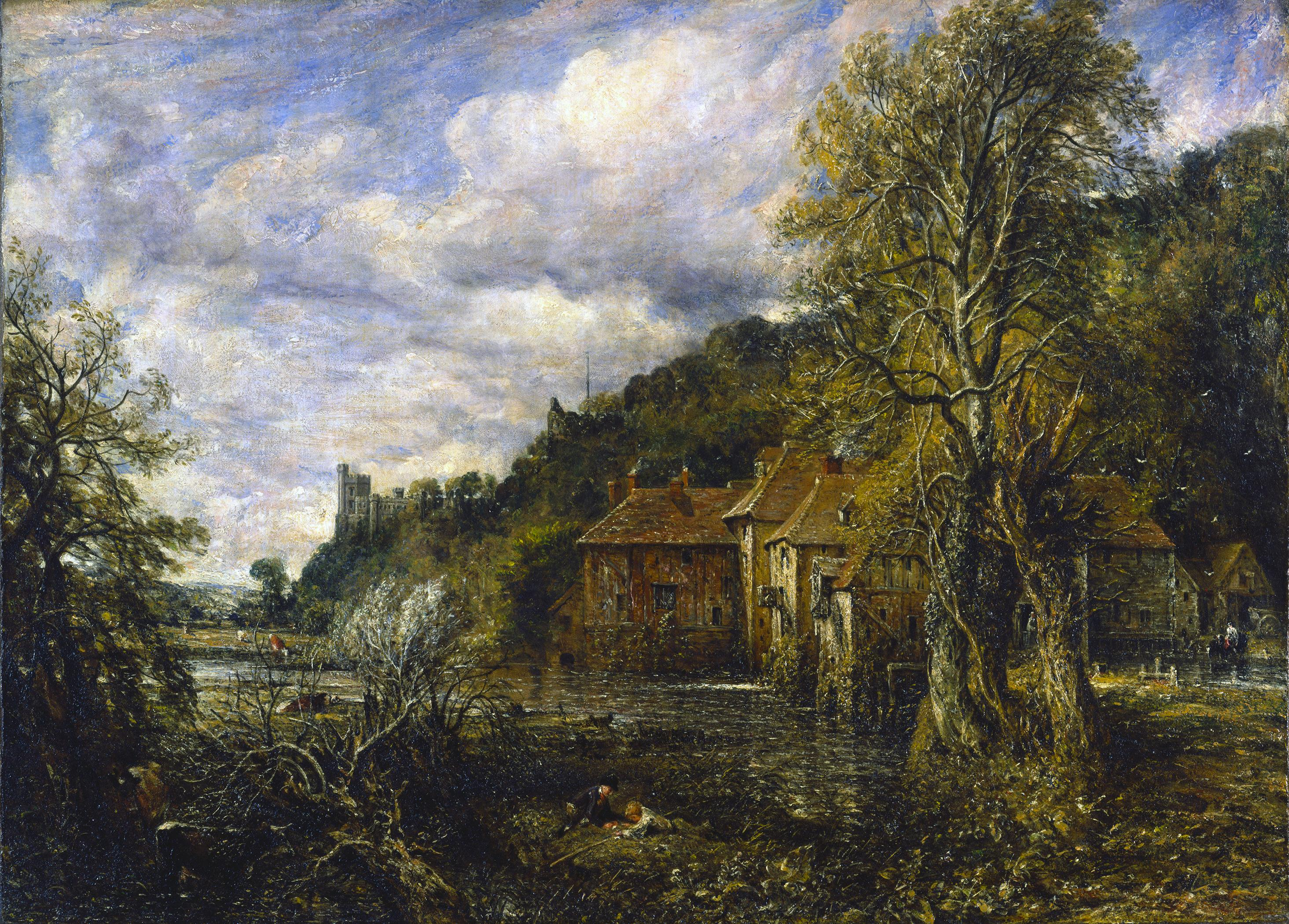
Arundel Mill and Castle by John Constable, 1837

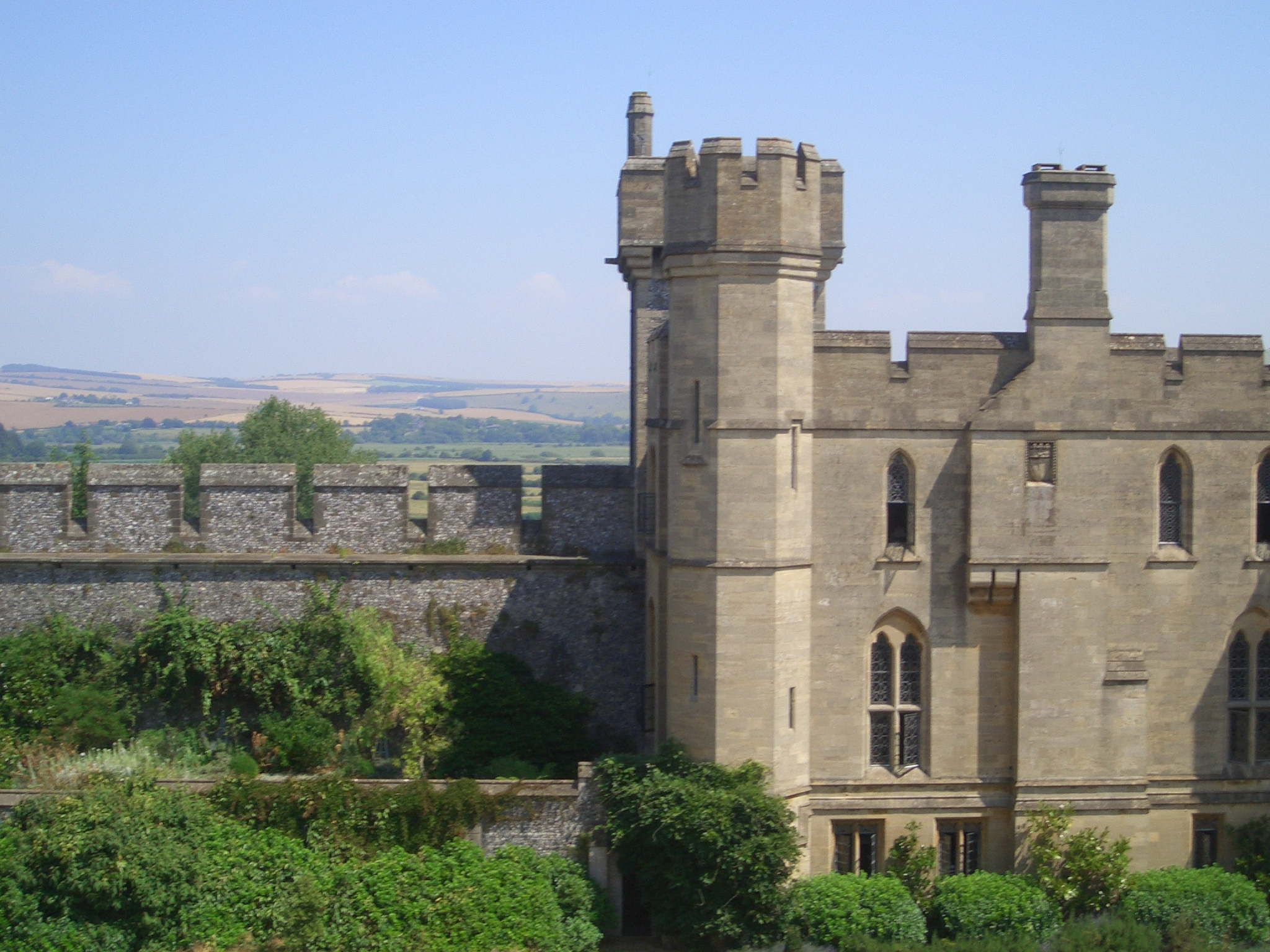
Junction of the old and new walls

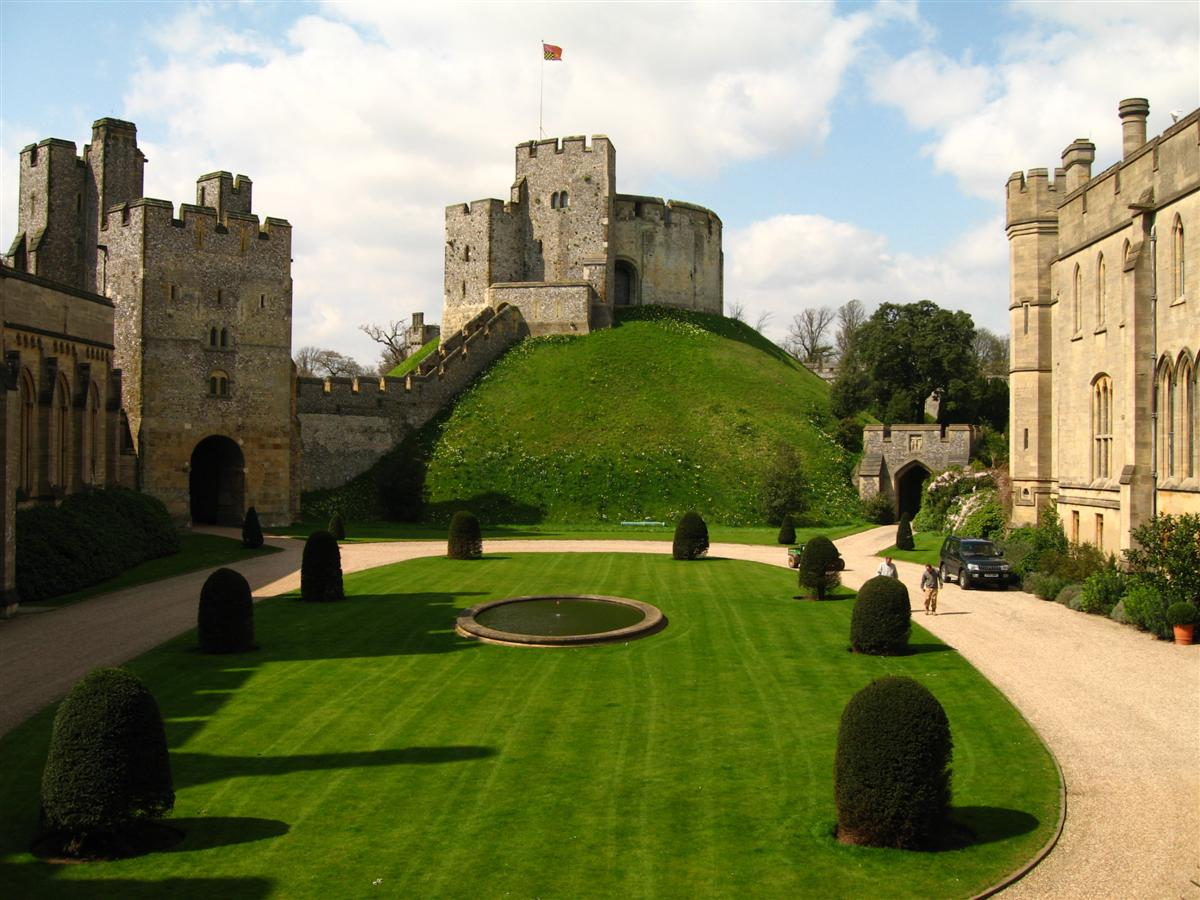
View of Arundel Castle's Norman motte with the quadrangle in the foreground

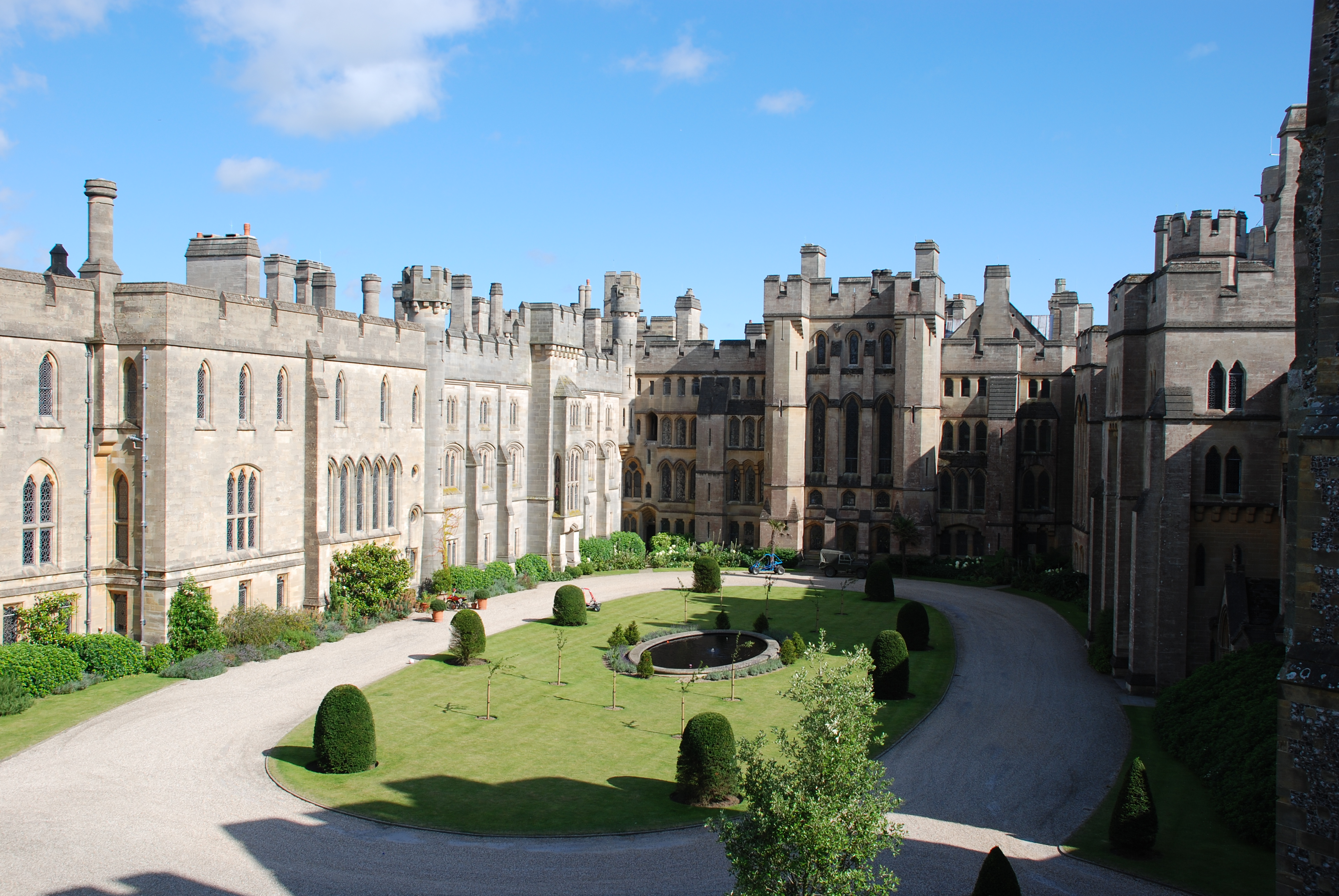
Courtyard

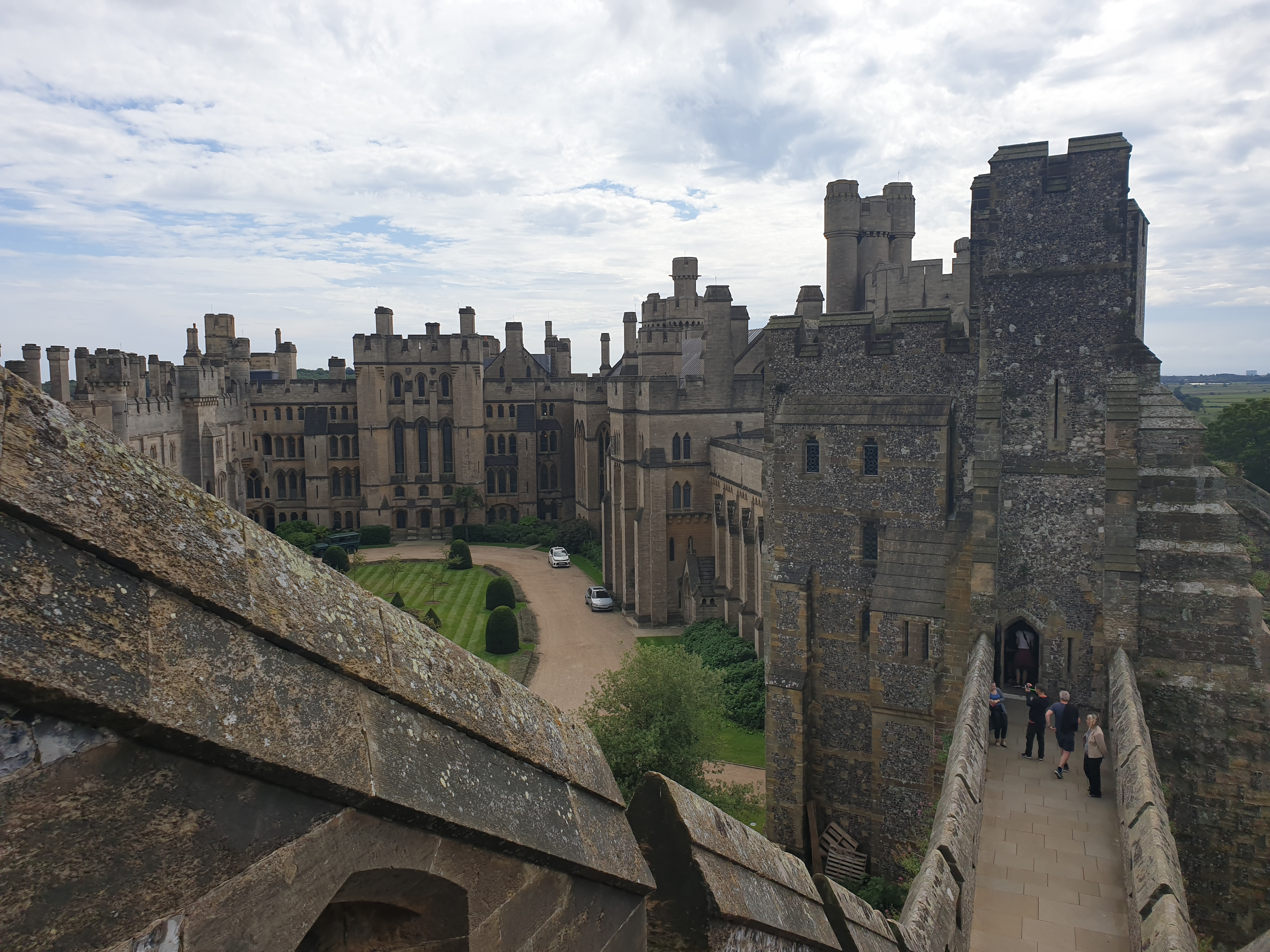
Exterior

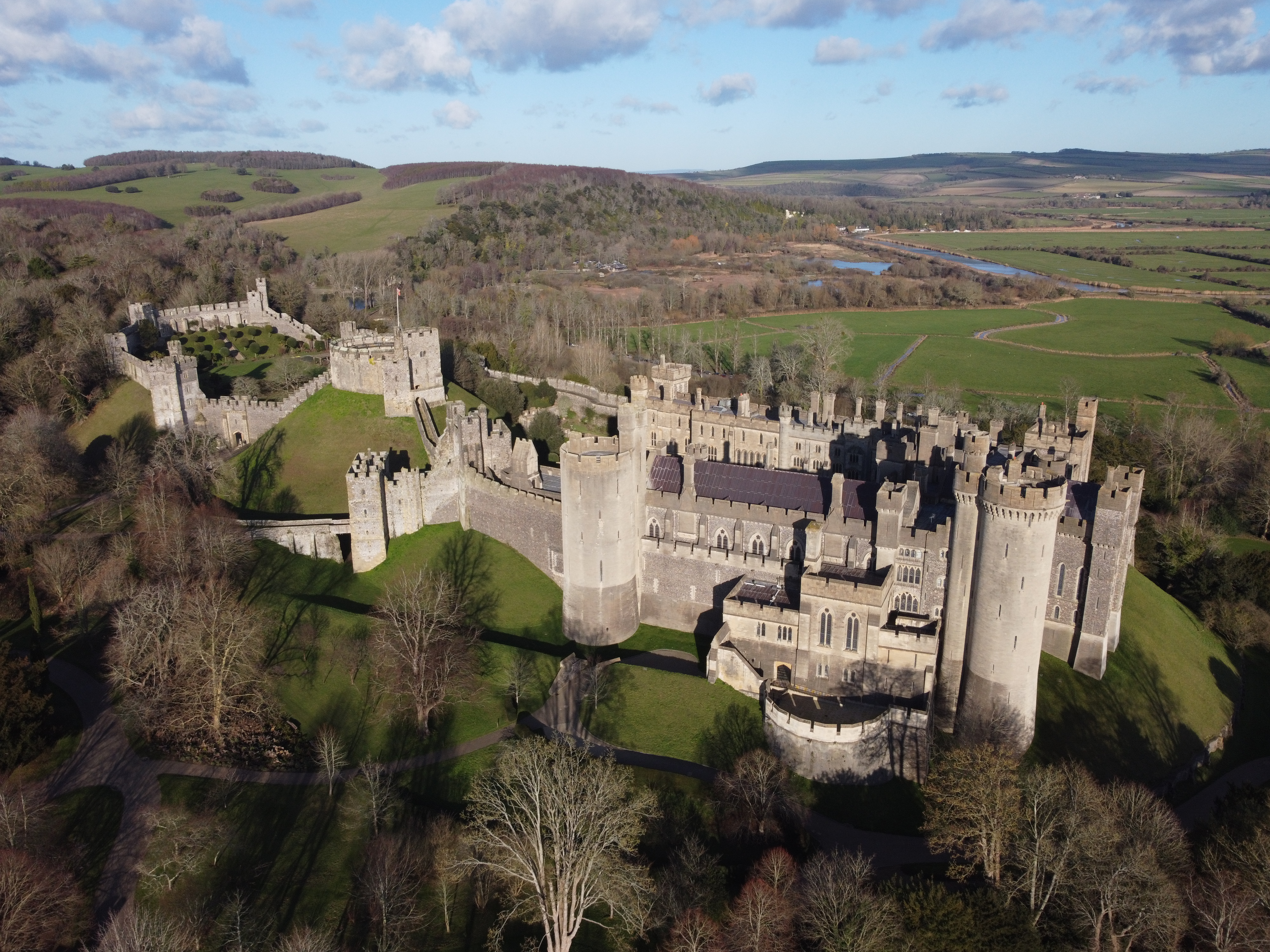
Aerial photograph of the castle

== See also ==
- Arundel Museum, close to the castle entrance
- Castles in Great Britain and Ireland
- List of castles in England
- Anne Arundell
