= Tamarisk, Isles of Scilly =

Coordinates: 49°54′50″N 6°19′09″W

Tamarisk
- Alternative names: Tamarisk House

General information
- Town or city: Hugh Town, Isles of Scilly
- Country: United Kingdom

Tamarisk, or Tamarisk House, is a house belonging to the Duchy of Cornwall, on St Mary's in the Isles of Scilly, in the United Kingdom off the coast of Cornwall.

The house is a cottage built in brick in the mid 1960s, standing in a plot of a quarter of an acre, largely hidden from view by tamarisk trees. Before King Charles III (then Prince of Wales and Duke of Cornwall) separated from Diana, Princess of Wales, they spent holidays in the Isles of Scilly but preferred to stay with friends on Tresco.

As of 2022, the house is being used as a holiday let operated by the Duchy of Cornwall.

Most of the rural areas of the Isles of Scilly are owned by the Duchy of Cornwall, although many properties in Hugh Town—the largest settlement in the islands—were sold to residents by King George VI in 1949, and the island of Tresco has been leased to the Dorrien Smith family since 1834. Tamarisks are deciduous flowering shrubs that grow in thickets, sheltered locations with maritime breezes and therefore flourish in the Isles of Scilly.
