= Jigsaw (clothing retailer) =

Clothing retailer based in London

- Headquarters: South West London
- Revenue: 800,667 pound sterling (2016)
- Number of employees: 28 (2016, 2017)
- Website: https://www.jigsaw-online.com/

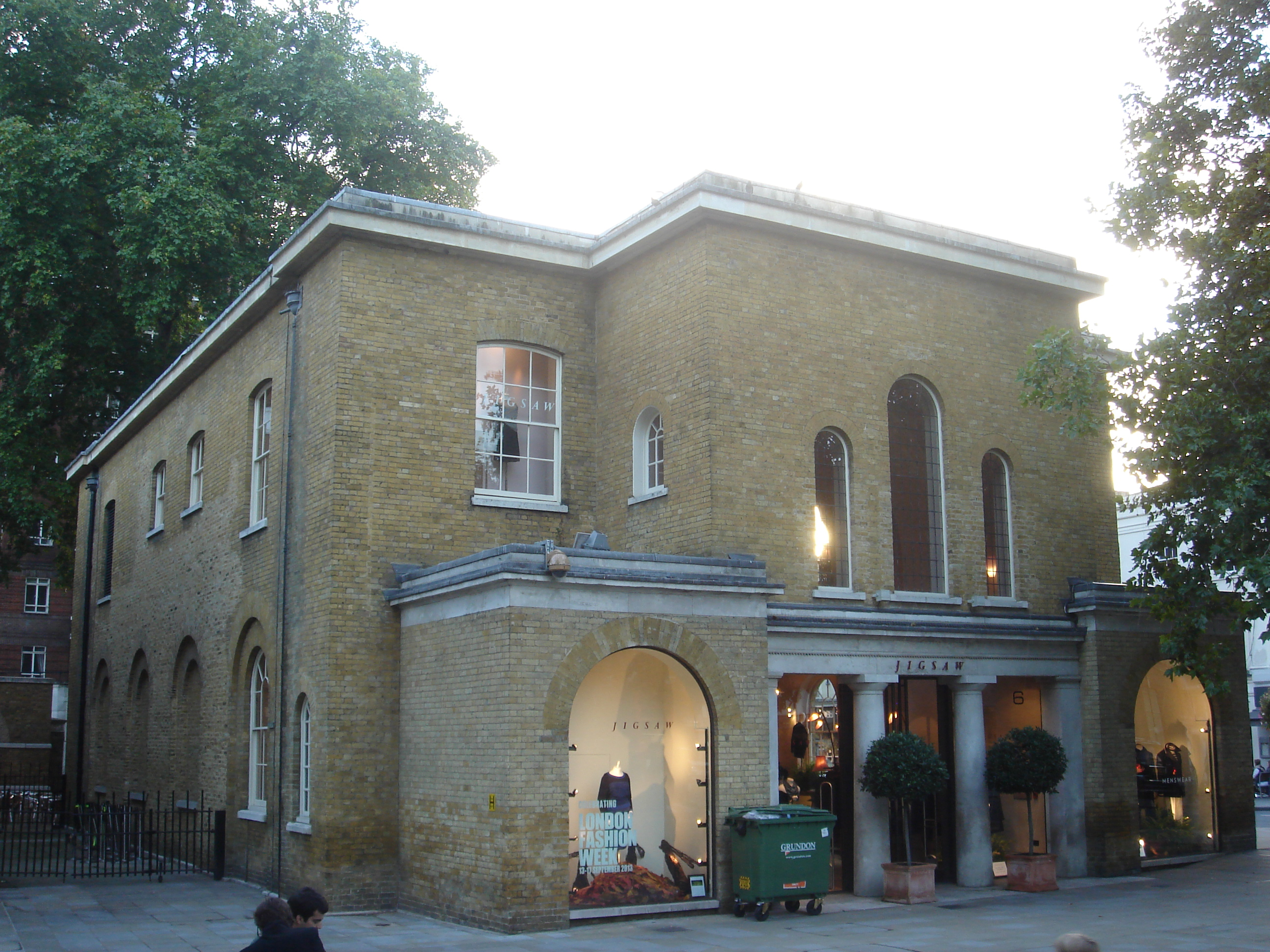
Chapel to Duke of York's Headquarters, King's Road, Chelsea, now a Jigsaw store

Jigsaw is a fashion clothing retailer with store and concession partners across United Kingdom, Ireland, the Netherlands, and Australia. The company is based on Water Lane in Richmond, South West London. It has approximately 80 stores across the UK as of August 2019. Jigsaw's sister company Kew 159 closed in 2012 following heavy financial losses.

== History ==
The company was started in 1970 by John Robinson, and is now jointly owned by Best Dressed Group and Robinson Property. Robinson (born 1948), who grew up in Herefordshire, went on a holiday to Turkey and brought back a sheepskin coat. People wanted a coat like his, so he and Webster went back to Istanbul and filled an old post office van with sixty coats and sold them back in the UK. Robinson lives on a farm in Wiltshire.

The company launched menswear in 1994, and produced it successfully for five years, selling clothes designed by Chris Bailey. In 1998, the same year that the menswear range was bringing in an annual turnover of £15 million, a Jigsaw ensemble was chosen as the men's outfit for the Dress of the Year. In 1999, Bailey bought out Jigsaw Menswear, rebranded it 'Uth' (pronounced 'Youth'), and offered more adventurous designs at higher prices, only to close down in 2002. In 2012, Jigsaw relaunched its menswear brand under the direction of Frances Walker, formerly of Nicole Farhi.

Jigsaw Junior was established in 1996 to further extend the range, however, this line consists only of girls' clothing. The same year they opened stores in Tokyo and Denmark.

In November 2006, Catherine Middleton became employed at the company as an assistant accessories buyer. She worked four days a week during a part-time schedule to manage the demands of her high-profile relationship with Prince William before leaving to work at the family business a year later.
