= Nottingham Cottage =

House in the grounds of Kensington Palace in London, England

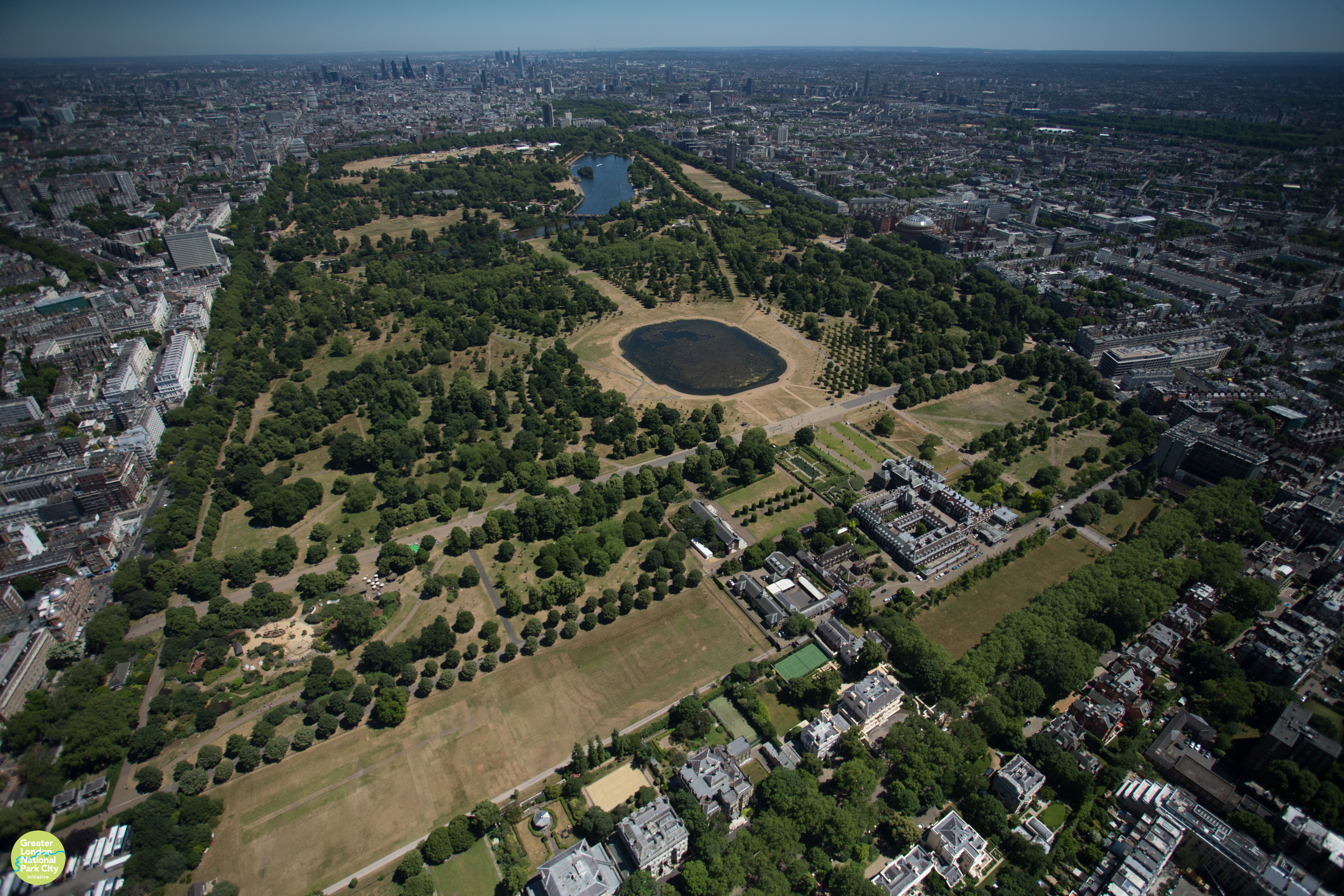
- View of the Kensington Palace grounds
- Interactive map of the Nottingham Cottage area
- Alternative names: Nott Cott

General information
- Type: House
- Location: London, England
- Coordinates: 51°30′21″N 0°11′19″W
- Owner: Crown Estate

Technical details
- Floor area: 1,324 square feet (123 m^{2})

Design and construction
- Architect: Christopher Wren

Cluster of outbuildings associated with Kensington Palace, including Nottingham Cottage

Nottingham Cottage is a house in the grounds of Kensington Palace in London, England. As a grace-and-favour property, the house has been frequently occupied by members of the British royal family, as well as staff and employees.

== Design and location ==
Nottingham Cottage is a house on the grounds of Kensington Palace. The ceilings are noted for their lowness, so previous residents the Prince of Wales and the Duke of Sussex have had to stoop to avoid hitting their heads. Marion Crawford, who resided at the cottage from 1948 to 1950, described it as "a dream 'of seasoned red brick ... with roses round the door'." It is 1,324 square feet (123 m^{2}) in size. It stands near two other grace-and-favour houses, Ivy Cottage and Wren Cottage.

The house was designed by Christopher Wren. Its name derives from Nottingham House, the former residence of Daniel Finch, 2nd Earl of Nottingham: in 1689, the second Earl sold the property to William III and Mary II, who developed the estate as Kensington House, later Kensington Palace.

== History ==
Nottingham Cottage has previously been home to Prince Henry, Duke of Gloucester, and his wife, Princess Alice, Duchess of Gloucester. Upon her retirement in 1948, the house was given for life to Marion Crawford, the former governess of Princesses Elizabeth and Margaret. In gratitude for Crawford's service, Queen Mary, the princesses' grandmother, decorated the house with Victorian furniture and prints of flowers for her. Crawford left the cottage in 1950 in the aftermath of her selling stories about the royal family to newspapers, which was revealed publicly by The Sunday Express editor John Gordon in an attempt to pressure her to provide more stories and articles to him.

The home was subsequently lent to Miles Hunt-Davis, private secretary of the Prince Philip, Duke of Edinburgh, and his wife Anita. Robert Fellowes, private secretary to Elizabeth II, and his wife Lady Jane Fellowes, the sister of Diana, Princess of Wales, also occupied the cottage.

Prince William, Duke of Cambridge, and Catherine, Duchess of Cambridge used Nottingham Cottage as their London residence after their marriage from 2011 to 2013, splitting their time between the cottage and their home on the Bodorgan Estate in Wales. The cottage was redecorated for the couple by interior designer Kelly Hoppen. The Duke and Duchess resided there with their son Prince George after his birth, before moving to Kensington Palace in October 2013.

Prince Harry moved into Nottingham Cottage from Clarence House following his brother's departure, with the house referred to as his "bachelor pad" after leaving the army. It is also one of the places where Prince Harry says he proposed to Meghan Markle; they subsequently resided together at the cottage following their engagement. In April 2019, the couple moved to Frogmore Cottage before the birth of their first child. Harry has said in his book Spare that a physical altercation took place between him and William in the cottage kitchen. Following their wedding, it was reported that Princess Beatrice and her husband Edoardo Mapelli Mozzi were to move into the cottage.
