= Marion Crawford (disambiguation) =

Marion Crawford (1909–1988) was a Scottish educator, and governess to Princess Margaret and Princess Elizabeth.

Marion Crawford may also refer to:

- Francis Marion Crawford (1854–1909), American novelist
- Marion Crawford (EastEnders), a fictional character in the soap opera EastEnders
