= Wren house =

Wren house may refer to

- a wren house, see nest box
- Wren House at Kensington Palace

== See also ==
- Wren Building, Williamsburg, Virginia, United States
- House wren, a small songbird of the wren family
