= Wren House =

House on the grounds of Kensington Palace

Coordinates: 51°30′21″N 0°11′20″W

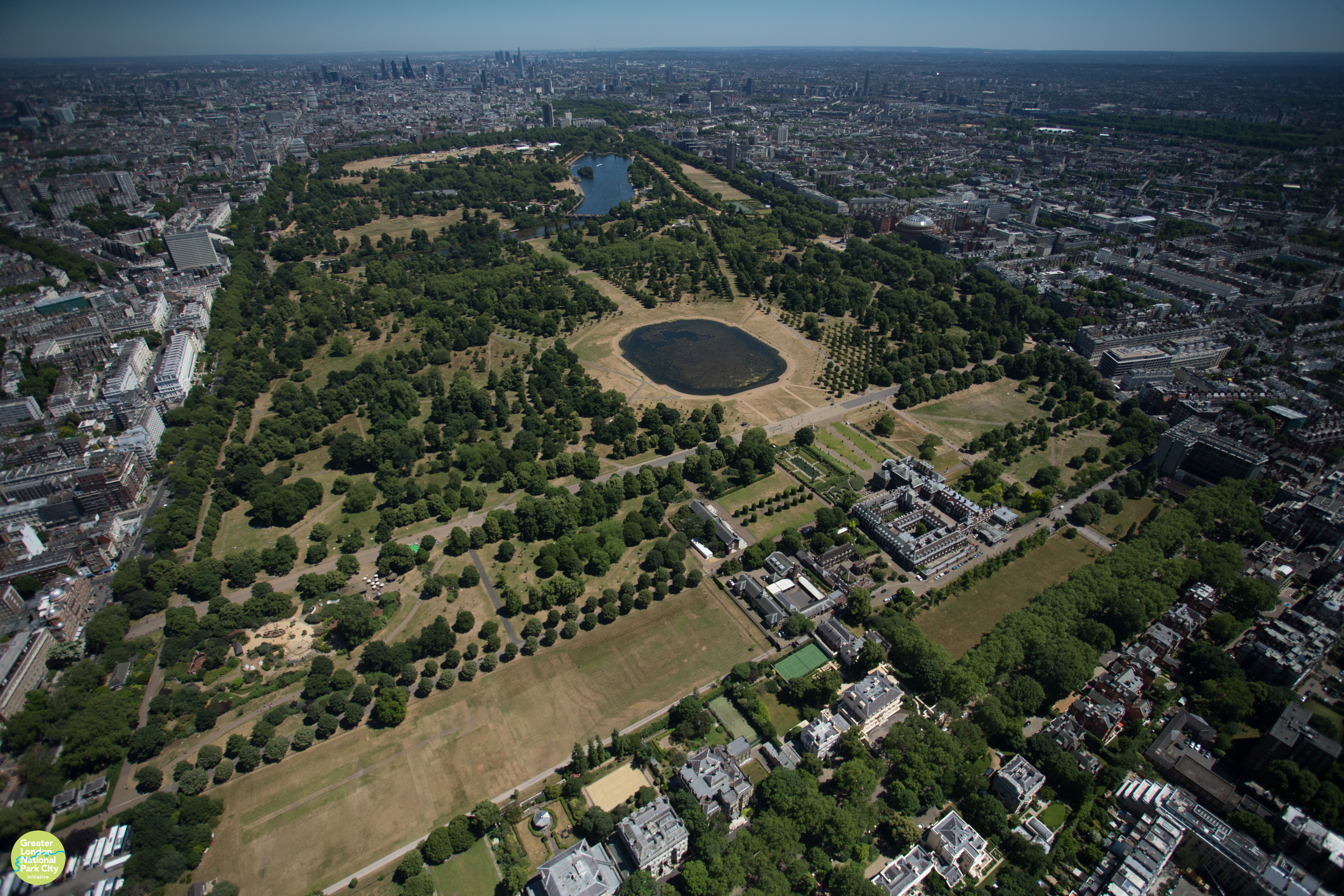
View of the Kensington Palace grounds, where Wren House is located

Cluster of outbuildings associated with Kensington Palace, including Wren House

Wren House is a house in the grounds of Kensington Palace in London, England. Wren House has been occupied since 1978 by Prince Edward, Duke of Kent, one of Queen Elizabeth II's cousins.

When Kensington Palace was made the Royal Residence, architect Christopher Wren was tasked to expand the existing structure. He added a cluster of cottages that included: Wren House; Ivy Cottage, the home of Princess Eugenie of York; and Nottingham Cottage, the former home of Prince Harry, Duke of Sussex.
