= Marion Crawford =

Scottish educator and royal governess

Marion Crawford CVO
- Born: Marion Kirk Crawford; 5 June 1909; Gatehead, East Ayrshire, Scotland
- Died: 11 February 1988 (aged 78); Aberdeen, Scotland
- Known for: Governess to Princess Elizabeth (the future Queen Elizabeth II) and Princess Margaret
- Spouse: George Buthlay (m. 1947; died 1977)

Marion Kirk Buthlay CVO (née Crawford; 5 June 1909 – 11 February 1988) was a Scottish educator and governess to Princess Elizabeth (the future Queen Elizabeth II) and Princess Margaret. Known then by her maiden name, Elizabeth and Margaret affectionately called her Crawfie. Crawford worked for the Royal Family from 1933 to 1949. Upon her departure, she agreed to write The Little Princesses, a book which told the story of her time with the family. Though given tentative approval by the royal family to publish anonymously, Crawford was completely ostracised by them after her writing appeared under her name; she left Nottingham Cottage, her grace and favour house, and no member of the family ever spoke to her again.

== Early life and royal governess ==
Crawford was born the daughter of a mechanical engineer's clerk, at Gatehead, East Ayrshire, on 5 June 1909. She was raised in Dunfermline, Fife, and taught at Edinburgh's Moray House Institute. While studying to become a child psychologist, she took a summer job as the governess for Lord Elgin's children. This led her to take a role in the household of the Duke and Duchess of York (later King George VI and Queen Elizabeth), as the Duchess was a distant relative of Lord Elgin. After one year the arrangement was made permanent.

Crawford became one of the governesses of Princess Elizabeth and Princess Margaret. Following the abdication of King Edward VIII in 1936, the Duke of York ascended the throne as King George VI, and Elizabeth became the heir presumptive. Crawford remained in service to the King and Queen, and did not retire until Princess Elizabeth's marriage in 1947, Crawford herself having married two months earlier. Crawford had already delayed her own marriage for 16 years so as not to, as she saw it, abandon the King and Queen.

== Retirement and authorship ==
Upon her retirement in 1948, Crawford was given Nottingham Cottage in the grounds of Kensington Palace, as a grace and favour home. Queen Mary, the princesses' grandmother, also provided it with antique furniture and flower prints as a mark of her appreciation.

After their wedding, Princess Elizabeth and the Duke of Edinburgh conducted an overseas tour, visiting Canada and the United States of America. Shortly afterwards, Bruce and Beatrice Gould, editors of the large circulation American magazine Ladies' Home Journal, contacted Buckingham Palace and the Foreign and Commonwealth Office to seek stories for publication across the Atlantic. Although the approach was refused by the Palace, the British government proved keen on the idea and suggested Marion Crawford, as the recently retired governess of the princesses.

In April 1949, having heard of the offer, Queen Elizabeth (later the Queen Mother) wrote to Crawford, saying:

I do feel, most definitely, that you should not write and sign articles about the children, as people in positions of confidence with us must be utterly oyster. If you, the moment you finished teaching Margaret, started writing about her and Lilibet, well, we should never feel confidence in anyone again.

However, the Queen did give a carefully qualified approval for her to anonymously provide some assistance, writing:

Mr [Dermot] Morrah (the man chosen to write the articles), who I saw the other day, seemed to think that you could help him with his articles and get paid from America. This would be quite all right as long as your name did not come into it. Nevertheless, I do feel most strongly that you must resist the allure of American money and persistent editors and say No No No to offers of dollars for articles about something as private and as precious as our family.

However, the contract with the Goulds stipulated: "You will further consider publication of the articles without Her Majesty's consent (possibly with only the consent of Princess Elizabeth, or no consent) and under your own name, on terms to be arranged."

In October 1949, Lady Astor sent a copy of the manuscript from the Goulds to Queen Elizabeth for her approval. The Queen was deeply distressed, finding it shockingly frank, especially Crawford's revelations of the King's moods and the Queen's chilly relationship with Wallis Simpson. She replied to Lady Astor saying: "The governess has gone off her head", and had her private secretary send a further letter to Lady Astor. This contained the Queen's annotations on the manuscript with the request that passages of particular concern be removed. The Goulds were taken aback as they considered the account sympathetic, but they kept the response from Crawford. As the first servant to cash in on the private lives of the royals, Crawford was ostracised by the royal family, and they never spoke to her again. So deep was the feeling of betrayal within the royal family that, for years afterward, servants who spoke publicly for money were said to be "doing a Crawfie".

Crawford's unauthorised work was published in Woman's Own in the UK and in the Ladies' Home Journal in the United States, becoming a sensation on both sides of the Atlantic. A book, The Little Princesses, also sold exceptionally well. Later she wrote stories about Queen Mary, Queen Elizabeth and Princess Margaret. She also put her name to Woman's Own's "Crawfie's Column", a social diary written by journalists several weeks in advance. In 1955, one column contained a reference to the Trooping the Colour ceremony and the Ascot races, when in fact they had been cancelled that year because of a national railway strikes. As the stories were written in advance, it was too late to stop their publication, and the truth behind the column was unspooled, leading to her public disgrace.

== Later life and death ==
Courtiers believed that Crawford was deeply under the influence of her husband George Buthlay, whom she married after her retirement, and that he pressured her to capitalise on her royal connections, as he himself did. Buthlay boasted of it in his business transactions, and had her ask the royal family to change their bank account to Drummonds, the bank for which he worked.

Crawford retired to Aberdeen, buying a house 200 yards (180 m) from the road to Balmoral; she completely withdrew from public life and refused all media requests. Although the royal family regularly drove past her front door on their way to Balmoral Castle, they never visited. When her husband died in 1977, she descended into depression and attempted suicide, leaving a note saying: "The world has passed me by and I can't bear those I love to pass me by on the road."

Crawford died at Hawkhill House (a nursing home in Aberdeen) on 11 February 1988. Neither the Queen, the Queen Mother nor Princess Margaret sent a wreath to her funeral.

== Media and popular culture ==
- Her story was featured in a 2000 Channel 4 documentary The Nanny Who Wouldn't Keep Mum.
- In 2021, Crawford was the focus of a novel by Tessa Arlen, In Royal Service to the Queen: A Novel of the Queen's Governess.
- Another novel about her story is The Good Servant, wrote by Fern Britton and published in 2022.
