= Kensington Palace =

Residence of the British royal family in London

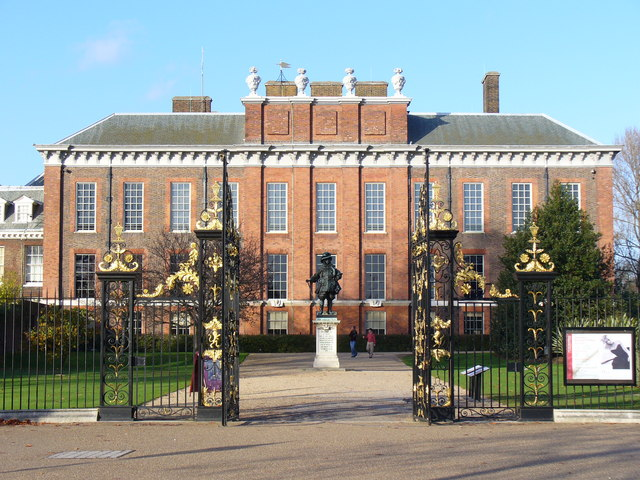
- Kensington Palace in November 2006

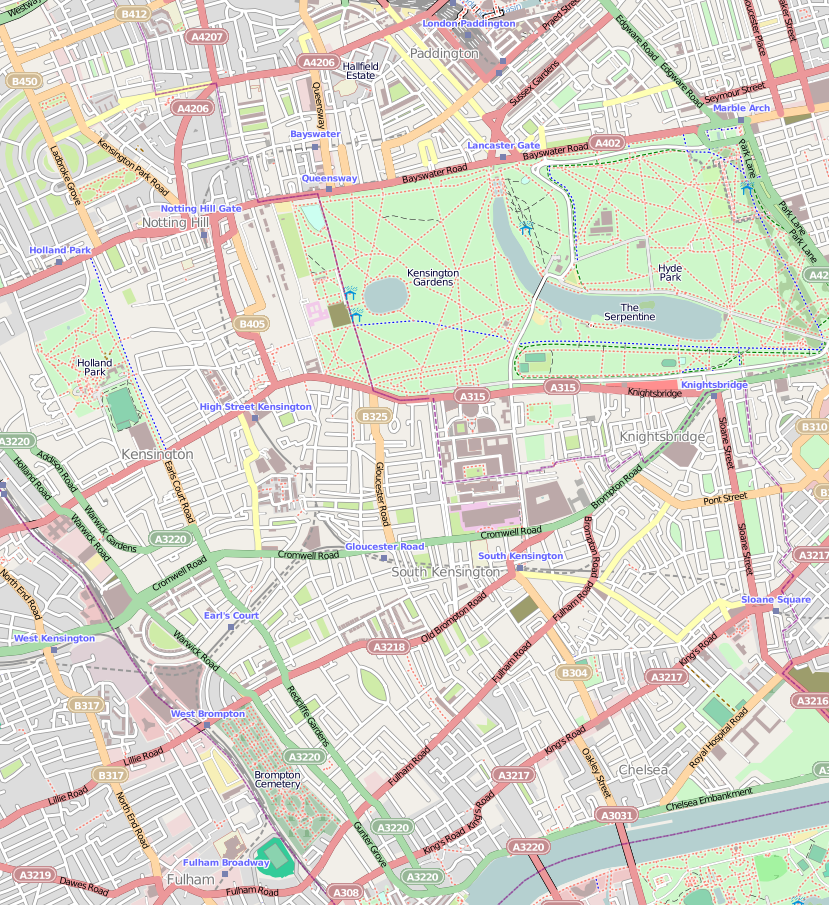
- Location within Kensington

General information
- Location: Kensington; London, W8, United Kingdom
- Coordinates: 51.505278°N 0.188333°W
- Owner: King Charles III in right of the Crown

Website
- www.hrp.org.uk

Listed Building – Grade I
- Official name: Kensington Palace
- Designated: 15 April 1969
- Reference no.: 1223861

Kensington Palace is a royal residence situated within Kensington Gardens in the Royal Borough of Kensington and Chelsea in London, England. It has served as a residence for the British royal family since the 17th century and is currently the official London residence of several royals, including the Prince and Princess of Wales, the Duke and Duchess of Gloucester, the Duke of Kent, Prince and Princess Michael of Kent, and Princess Eugenie alongside her husband, Jack Brooksbank. The term "Kensington Palace" is often used as a metonym for the offices of the royals who reside there.

Today, the State Rooms of Kensington Palace are open to the public and are managed by Historic Royal Palaces, an independent charity that operates without public funding. The palace's offices and private living quarters remain the responsibility of the Royal Household. Additionally, Kensington Palace showcases numerous paintings and other artifacts from the Royal Collection.

== History ==
=== King William III and Queen Mary II ===
Kensington Palace was originally a two-storey Jacobean mansion built by Sir George Coppin in 1605 in the village of Kensington.

Shortly after William and Mary assumed the throne as joint monarchs in 1689, they began searching for a residence better suited for the comfort of the asthmatic William. Whitehall Palace was too near the River Thames, with its fog and floods, for William's fragile health. In the summer of 1689, William and Mary bought the property, then known as Nottingham House, from the Secretary of State Daniel Finch, 2nd Earl of Nottingham, 7th Earl of Winchilsea, for £20,000. They instructed Sir Christopher Wren, Surveyor of the King's Works, to begin an immediate expansion of the house. In order to save time and money, Wren kept the structure intact and added a three-storey pavilion at each of the four corners, providing more accommodation for the King and Queen, and their attendants. The Queen's Apartments were in the north-west pavilion and the King's in the south-east.

Wren re-oriented the house to face west, building north and south wings to flank the approach, made into a proper cour d'honneur that was entered through an archway surmounted by a clock tower. The palace was surrounded by straight cut solitary lawns, and formal stately gardens, laid out with paths and flower beds at right angles, in the Dutch garden fashion. The royal court took residence in the palace shortly before Christmas 1689. For the next seventy years, Kensington Palace was the favoured residence of British monarchs, although the official seat of the Court was and remains at St. James's Palace, which has not been the actual royal residence in London since the 17th century.

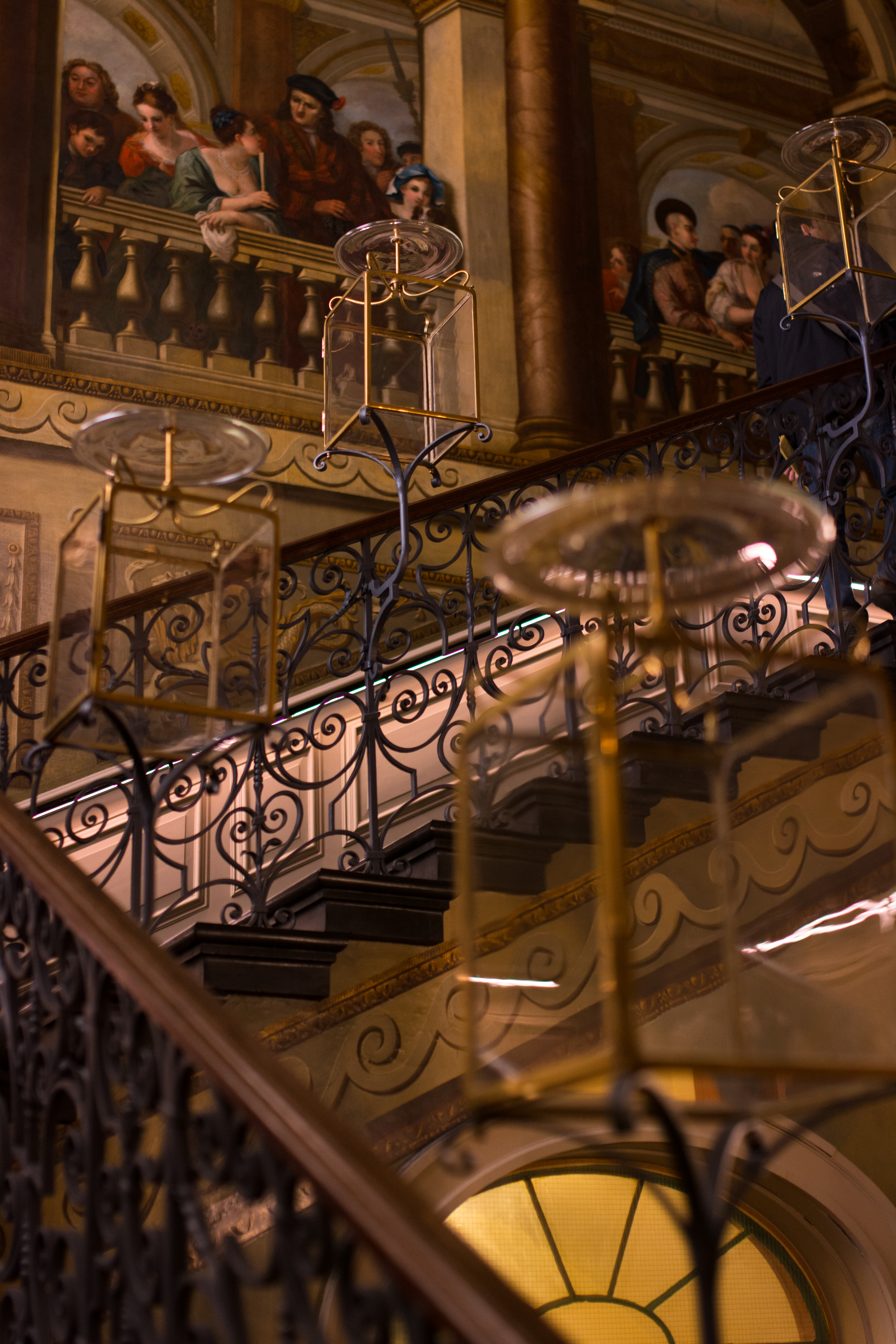
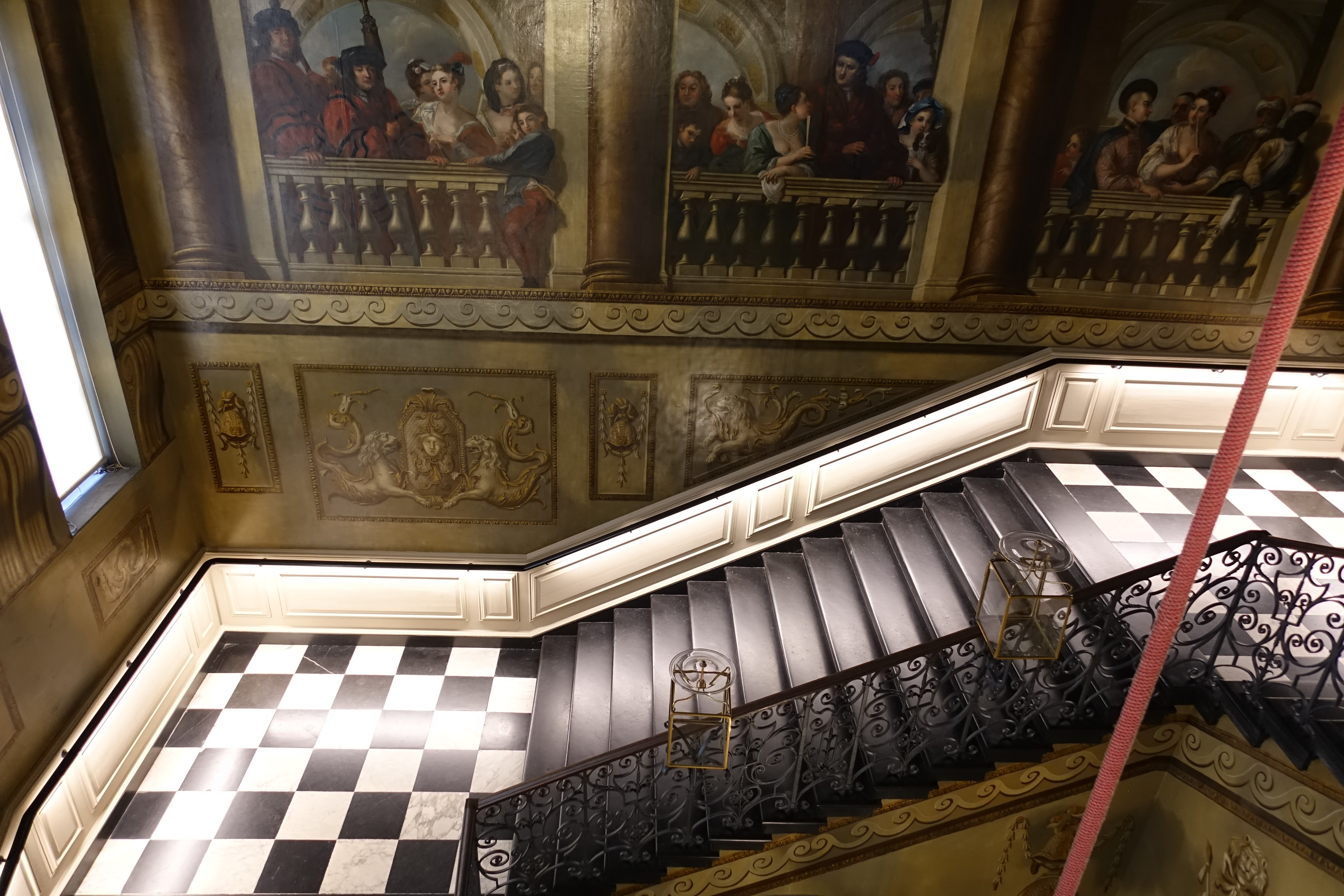
The King's Staircase

Additional improvements soon after included Queen Mary's extension of her apartments by building the Queen's Gallery. After a fire in 1691, the King's Staircase was rebuilt in marble and a Guard Chamber was constructed, facing the foot of the stairs. William had constructed the South Front, to the design of Nicholas Hawksmoor, which included the Kings' Gallery where he hung many works from his picture collection. Mary II died of smallpox in the palace in 1694. In 1702, William suffered a fall from a horse at Hampton Court and was brought to Kensington Palace, where he died shortly afterwards from pneumonia.

=== Queen Anne ===
After William III's death in 1702, the palace became the residence of Queen Anne. She had Christopher Wren complete the extensions that William and Mary had begun. The work produced the section known as the Queen's Apartments, which includes the Queen's Entrance, and the plainly decorated Wren designed staircase. Its shallow steps allowed Anne to walk down gracefully. Anne used the new section mainly as a route between her private apartments and gardens.

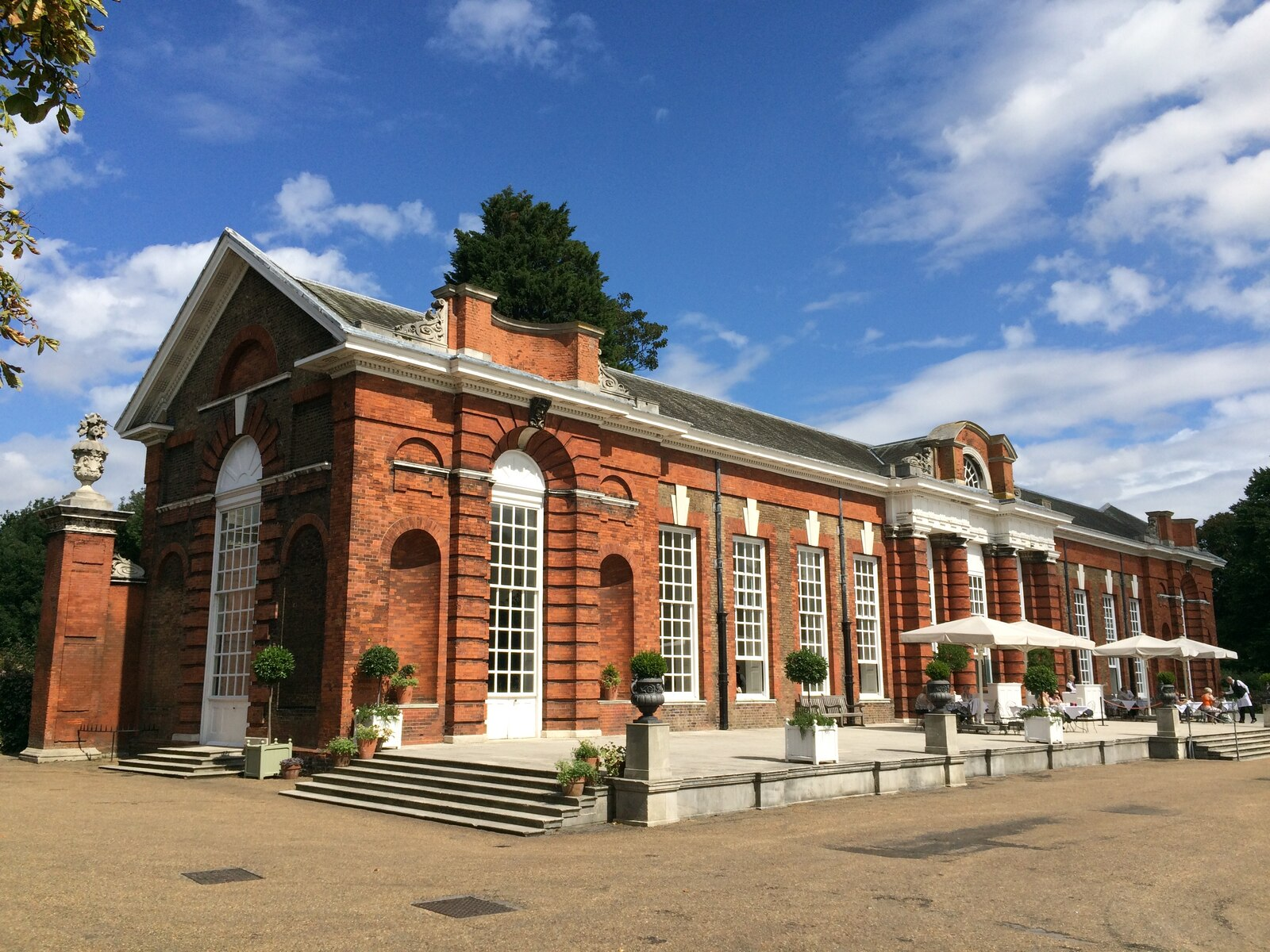
The Orangery

Queen Anne's most notable contribution to the palace were the gardens. She commissioned the Hawksmoor-designed Orangery, modified by John Vanbrugh, that was built for her in 1704. The level of decoration of the interior, including carved detail by Grinling Gibbons, reflects its intended use, not just as a greenhouse, but as a place for entertaining. A magnificent 12-hectare (30-acre) baroque parterre, with sections of clipped scrolling designs punctuated by trees formally clipped into cones, was laid out by Henry Wise, the royal gardener.

Kensington Palace was the setting of the final argument between Sarah, Duchess of Marlborough, and Queen Anne. The Duchess, who was known for being outspoken and manipulative, was jealous of the attention the Queen was giving to Abigail Masham, Baroness Masham. Anne's husband, Prince George of Denmark, had died at Kensington Palace in October 1708, and the Duchess's insensitive acts afterwards compounded the tension. Their friendship came to an abrupt end on 6 April 1710, with the two seeing each other for the last time after an argument in the Queen's Closet. Queen Anne died at Kensington Palace on 1 August 1714.

=== King George I and King George II ===
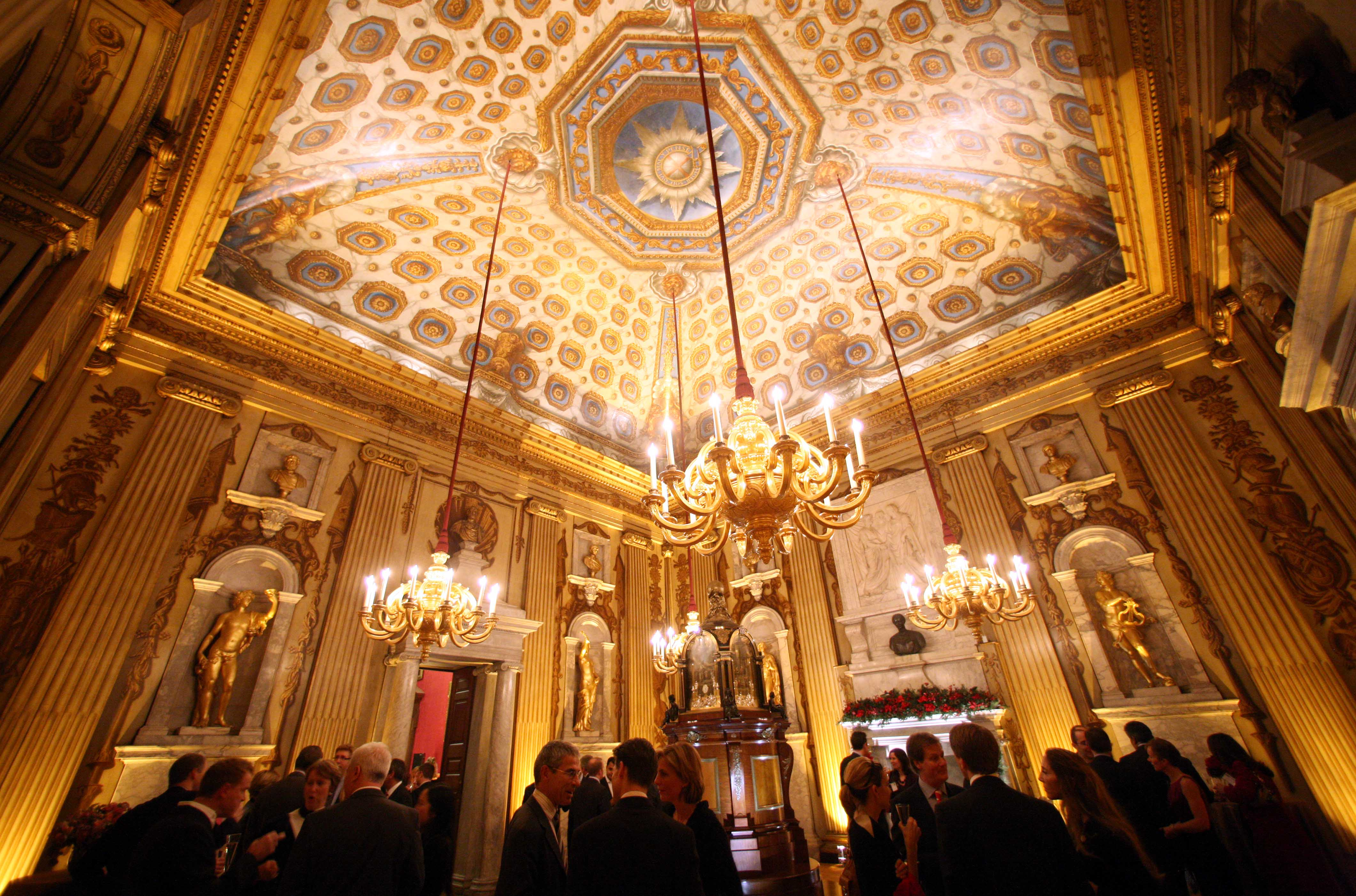
The Cupola Room

George I spent lavishly on new royal apartments, creating three new state rooms known as the Privy Chamber, the Cupola Room and the Withdrawing Room. He hired the-then unknown William Kent in 1722 to decorate the state rooms, which he did with elaborately painted trompe-l'œil ceilings and walls. The Cupola Room was Kent's first commission for the King. The octagonal coffering in the domed ceiling was painted in gold and blue, and terminated in a flat panel decorated with the Star of the Order of the Garter. The walls and woodwork were painted brown and gold to contrast with the white marble pilasters, doorways and niches which were surmounted with gilded statuary.

George I was pleased with his work, and between 1722, and 1727, Kent oversaw the decoration and picture hanging for all of the royal apartments at Kensington Palace. Kent's final commission was the King's Grand Staircase which he painted with 45 intriguing courtiers from the Georgian court, including the King's Turkish servants Mahomet and Mustapha, Peter 'the wild boy', along with himself and his mistress. King George I enlarged the palace with the addition of an apartment, built on the north-west side, to house his mistress, Melusine von der Schulenburg, Duchess of Kendal.

The last reigning monarch to use Kensington Palace was George II, who did not undertake any major structural changes to the palace during his reign, and left the running of the palace to his wife Caroline of Ansbach. At the request of the Queen, Charles Bridgeman, successor to Henry Wise as royal gardener, swept away the outmoded parterres and redesigned Kensington Gardens in a form that is still recognisable today: his remaining features are the Serpentine, the basin called the Round Pond, and the Broad Walk. After the death of his wife, George II neglected many rooms and the palace fell into disrepair. King George II died at Kensington Palace on 25 October 1760.

=== Notable palace residents ===
==== 19th century ====
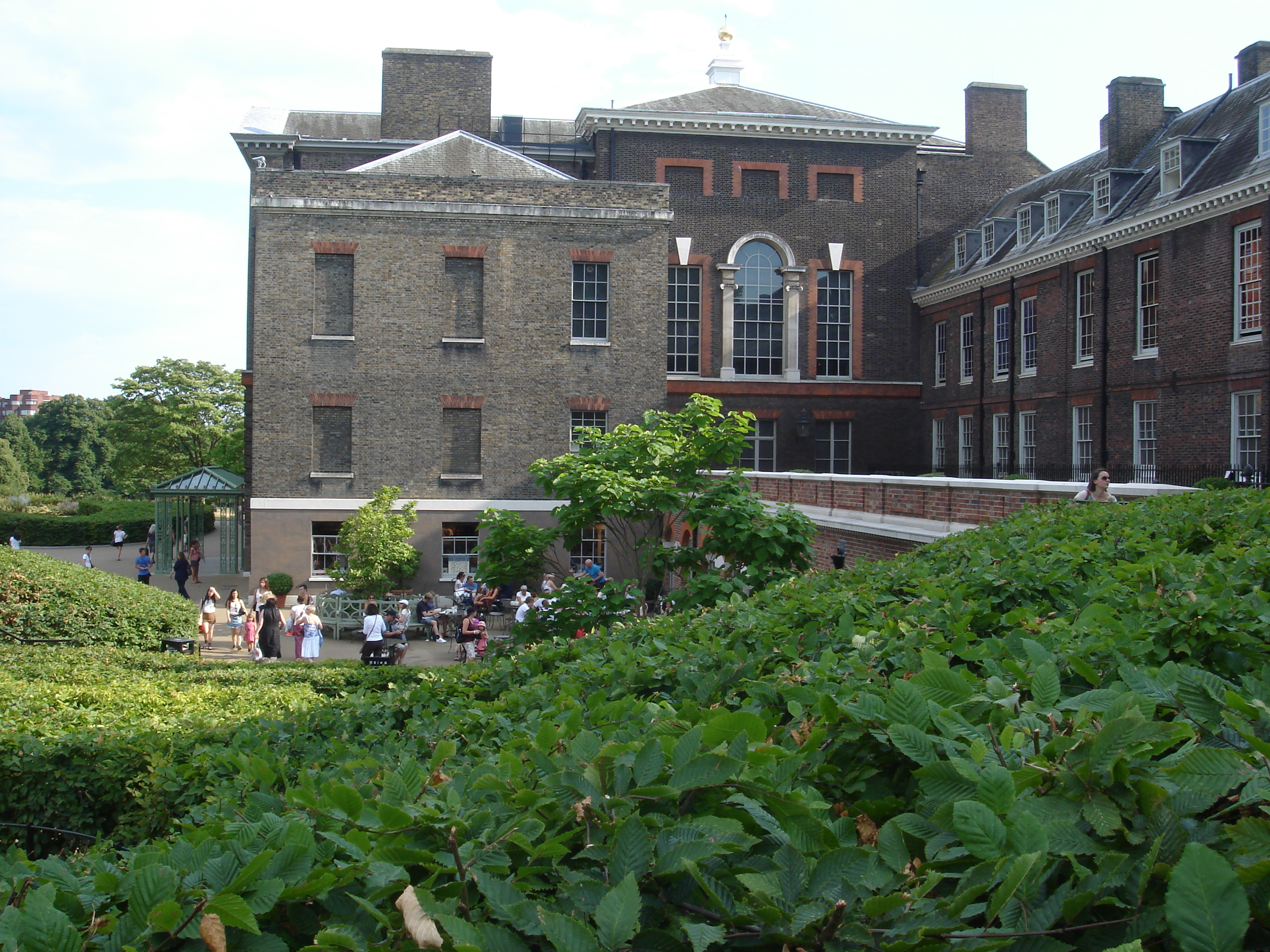
Side-view, showing the visitors' café below and above, the changes in fenestration from later building work to the state rooms.

With the accession of George III in 1760, Kensington Palace was only used for minor royalty. The sixth son of George III, Prince Augustus Frederick, Duke of Sussex, was allocated apartments in the south-west corner of Kensington Palace in 1805 known as Apartment 1. He was interested in the arts and science and amassed a huge library that filled ten rooms and comprised over fifty thousand volumes. He had a large number of clocks, and a variety of singing birds that were free to fly around his apartments. He was elected as president of the Royal Society and gave receptions in his apartments at Kensington Palace to men of science. The expense they incurred induced him to resign the presidency, as he preferred to employ the money in making additions to his library.

The Duke of Sussex caused quite a scandal when he married twice in contravention of the Royal Marriages Act 1772, because it had not been approved by the King. His second wife, Cecilia Underwood, Duchess of Inverness, was never titled or recognised as the Duchess of Sussex. However, she was created Duchess of Inverness in her own right in 1840. The Duke died at Kensington Palace in 1843. As he had lived beyond his means and amassed substantial debts, his possessions, including the library, were sold after his death. The Duchess of Inverness continued to reside at Kensington Palace until her death in 1873.

Prince Edward, Duke of Kent and Strathearn, the fourth son of King George III, was allocated two floors of rooms in the south-east corner of the palace, below the State Apartments, which he renovated for his use. The apartments were next to his near-blind sister Princess Sophia. His daughter, Alexandrina Victoria, was born on 24 May 1819, and her christening conducted in the Cupola Room the following month. The Duke of Kent and Strathearn died nine months after the birth of his daughter.

She grew up in the confines of the palace in an unhappy and lonely childhood as a result of the Kensington System adopted by her mother, Victoria, Duchess of Kent, and the domineering Sir John Conroy, her mother's comptroller of the household. Princess Sophia fell under the sway of Conroy, who took advantage of her senility and blindness. She frequently served as his spy on the Kensington household, as well as on her two elder brothers. Conroy squandered most of her money until she died in 1848, at Kensington Palace.

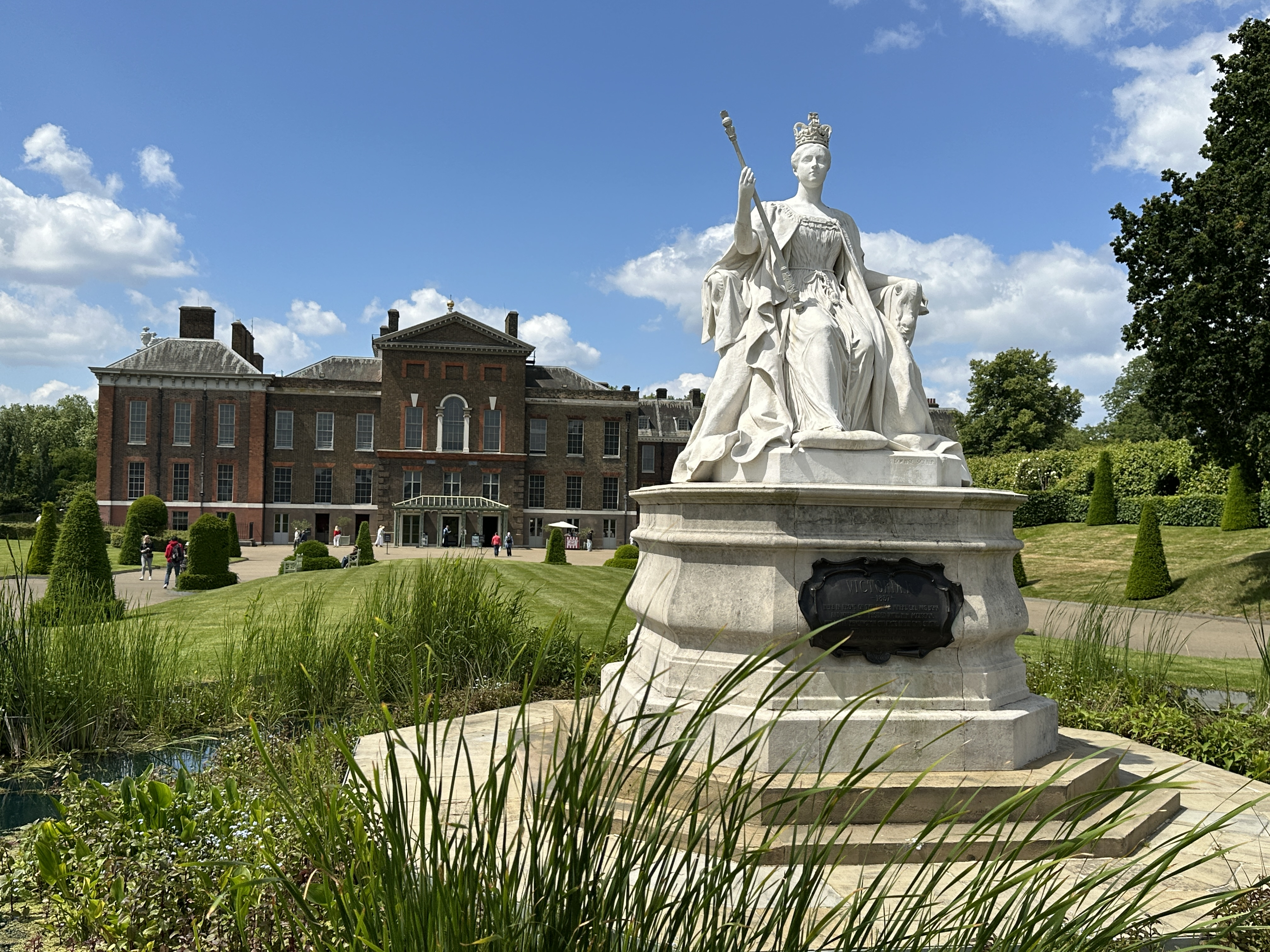
Princess Louise's statue of Queen Victoria, Kensington Palace

In 1837, Princess Alexandrina Victoria was awakened to be told that her uncle, King William IV, had died and that she was now queen. She took the regnal name of Victoria and held her first privy council in the Red Saloon at the palace. The Queen promptly moved to Buckingham Palace. She granted rooms in Kensington Palace to her family and retired retainers, who included the Duke and Duchess of Teck, parents of Queen Mary (great-grandmother of King Charles III), who was born at Kensington Palace on 26 May 1867. In 1873, Princess Louise (then Marchioness of Lorne, later Duchess of Argyll), resided in the apartment with her husband, the Marquess of Lorne (later the Duke of Argyll), departing after he was appointed Governor General of Canada for Rideau Hall.

The couple returned after his tenure, and Louise used her art studio at the apartments to design and sculpt the Statue of Queen Victoria, Kensington Palace. The apartment became her primary residence upon her widowhood in 1914 before her death in 1939. In 1955, the apartment was given to the widowed Princess Marina, Duchess of Kent, and her children until her death in 1968. Louise's younger sister, Princess Beatrice, was given by Queen Victoria the apartments once occupied by the Queen and her mother below the State Apartments.

==== 20th century ====
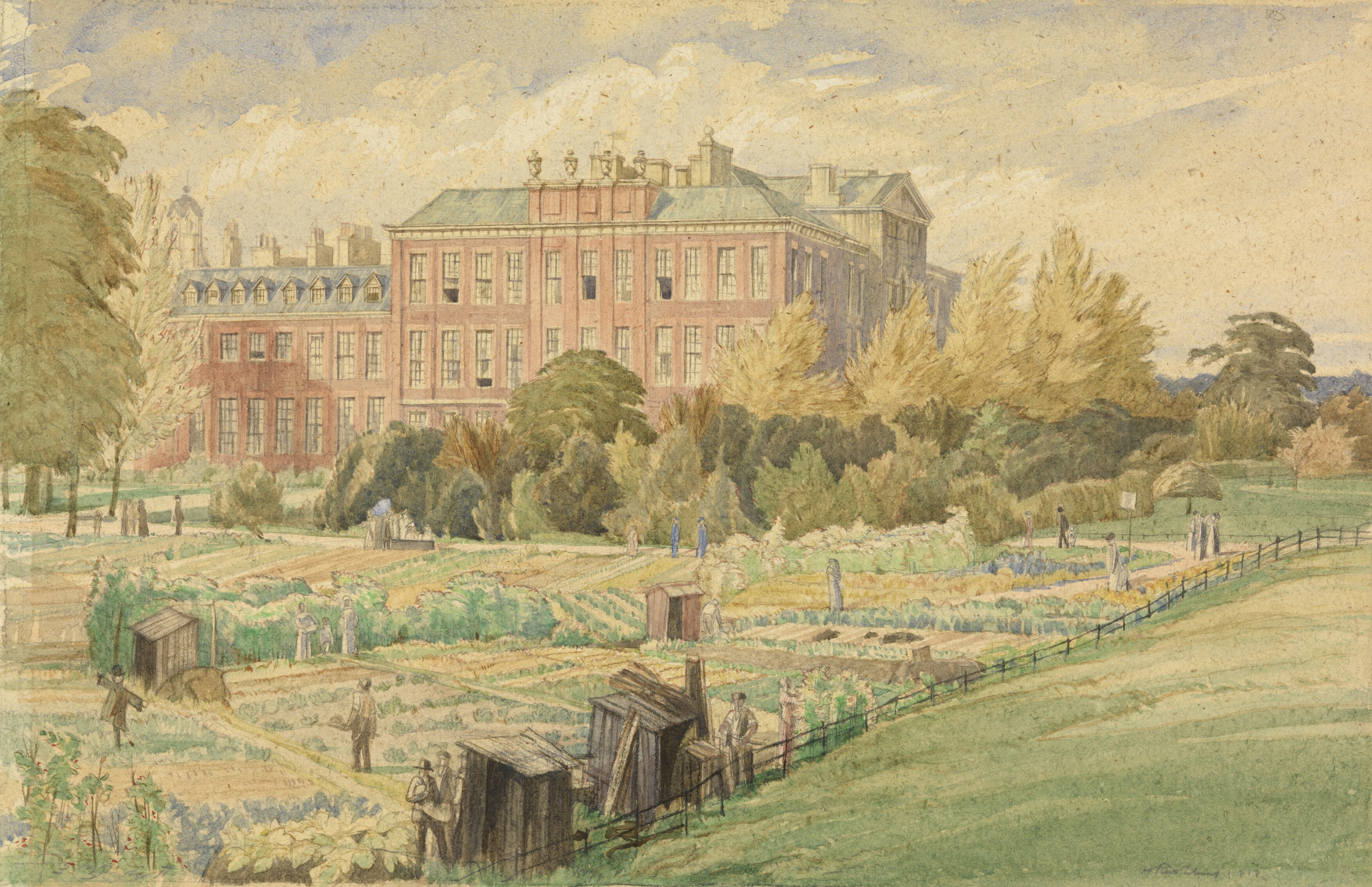
Allotments at Kensington Palace during the First World War, by Henry Rushbury

During World War I, George V allowed a number of rooms in the palace to be used by those working for Irish POWs and Irish soldiers at the front, and decreed that its royal inhabitants adhere to the same rations as everyone else. The royal inhabitants now included Princess Helena, Duchess of Albany; Princess Alice, Countess of Athlone; and Alexander Cambridge, 1st Earl of Athlone. In 1921, upon widowhood, Victoria, Marchioness of Milford Haven, moved into a grace-and-favour apartment at Kensington Palace. During this period, her grandson, Prince Philip, lived with her at times as she was in charge of his education. As a result of the number of royal relatives residing there during the 1920s and 1930s, Edward VIII called the palace "the aunt heap".

Kensington Palace was severely damaged during the Blitz of 1940. On 14 October it was hit by an incendiary bomb that exploded in the north side of Clock Court, damaging many of the surrounding buildings including the State Apartments, particularly the Queen's Apartments, as well as several grace-and-favour apartments of various courtiers and members of the extended Royal Family, including those of Princess Alice, Countess of Athlone (No. 4), the Keppels (No. 5), The Dowager Marchioness of Milford Haven (No. 7), Lady Patricia Ramsay (No. 8) and Lady Bertha Dawkins (No. 9). The Headquarters of Personnel Section occupied Apartment 34, and as a result the garden was overrun with anti-aircraft guns, sandbags and trenches.

Repairs to the palace were not completed for several years, but after the war, Prince Philip stayed with his grandmother, Victoria, Marchioness of Milford Haven in the lead-up to his 1947 marriage with Princess Elizabeth, later to become Queen Elizabeth II.

With the bombing damage and the deaths of Princess Louise and Princess Beatrice, the palace entered a period of neglect. During the 1950s, residents of the palace included the Master of the Horse, Henry Somerset, 10th Duke of Beaufort, who had married Lady Mary Cambridge – a niece of Queen Mary as the daughter of Adolphus Cambridge, 1st Marquess of Cambridge, Sir Alan Lascelles, Queen Elizabeth's private secretary and Princess Alice, Countess of Athlone, who lived in the palace until her death in 1981.

In 1955, the widowed Princess Marina, Duchess of Kent, moved into Apartment 1, with her children, which had been vacant since Princess Louise's death in 1939. It was at this time that the apartment was divided and Apartment 1A created. The stylish Duchess of Kent continued to live in the apartment until her death at Kensington Palace of a brain tumour in 1968.

Following their wedding on 6 May 1960, Princess Margaret, Countess of Snowdon, sister of Queen Elizabeth II, and Antony Armstrong-Jones, 1st Earl of Snowdon, moved into Apartment 10, while they set about transforming the much larger Apartment 1A to new designs. In 1960, Kensington Palace was under the auspices of the Ministry of Works. The renovation had to be carried out under the strictest of budgets, with the eventual costs coming in at £85,000, approximately £1.5 million today. By 1962, the whole interior had been gutted. All the floors, except the attic floor, were removed to deal with rising damp.

The resulting modern apartment consisted of the main reception rooms, three principal bedrooms and dressing rooms, three principal bathrooms, the nursery accommodation, nine staff bedrooms, four staff bathrooms, two staff kitchens and two staff sitting rooms. Twenty ancillary rooms included a linen store, a luggage room, a drying room, a glass pantry and a photographic dark room for Lord Snowdon.

The house in 18th century style, had a modern colour palette, with the bold use of colours including Margaret's favourites, pink and kingfisher blue. The house was largely designed by Snowdon and Princess Margaret with the assistance of the theatre designer Carl Toms, one-time assistant to Oliver Messel, Lord Snowdon's uncle, and a close friend of the royal couple. The royal couple moved into Apartment 1A on 4 March 1963, prior to the birth of their daughter, Lady Sarah, who was born at the palace the following year.

Prince and Princess Richard of Gloucester, later Duke and Duchess of Gloucester, moved into Apartment 1 after their marriage in 1972, the 21-room house previously occupied by Princess Marina, where they subsequently raised their three children. In 1994, after the Gloucesters had to give up their country home, Barnwell Manor, for financial reasons, they moved the Duke's aged mother Princess Alice, Duchess of Gloucester, from Barnwell to Kensington Palace where she died in her sleep on 29 October 2004 at age 102. She holds the record as the oldest person in the history of the British royal family.

The Queen gave the keys to the five-bedroom, five-reception grace-and-favour Apartment 10 to Prince and Princess Michael of Kent on the occasion of their marriage in 1978. Their children, Lord Frederick Windsor and Lady Gabriella Kingston, were raised at the residence. In 2008, there was controversy when it was claimed that the couple paid a rent of only £70 per week, though they fulfilled no official duties on behalf of the Queen. The British Monarchy Media Centre denied these reports and stated that, "The Queen is paying the rent for Prince and Princess Michael of Kent's apartment at a commercial rate of £120,000 annually from her own private funds... This rent payment by The Queen is in recognition of the Royal engagements and work for various charities which Prince and Princess Michael of Kent have undertaken at their own expense, and without any public funding."

It was announced that from 2010, that Prince and Princess Michael would begin paying rent of £120,000 a year out of their own funds to continue living in the apartment. In 1996, Prince Edward, Duke of Kent and his wife Katharine moved into Wren House on the Kensington Palace estate.

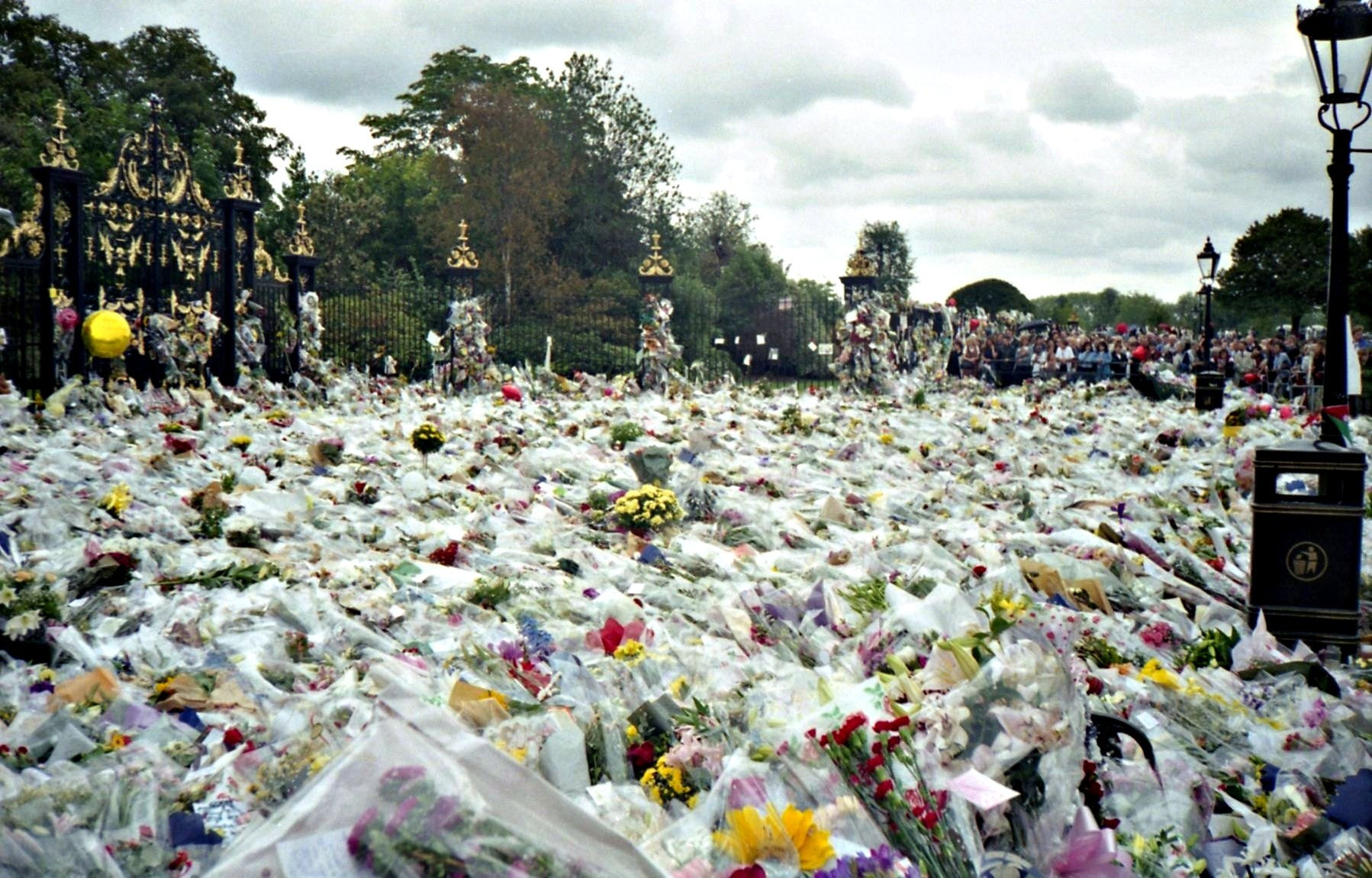
Flowers left outside Kensington Palace mourning the death of Diana, Princess of Wales

In 1981, in the part of the palace that King George I had built for his mistress, the Duchess of Kendal, Apartments 8 and 9 were combined to create the London residence of the newly married Prince of Wales and his wife, Diana, Princess of Wales. It remained the official residence of the Princess after their divorce until her death. Her sons, Princes William and Harry, were raised in Kensington Palace and went to local nursery and pre-preparatory schools in Notting Hill, which is a short drive away. According to Andrew Morton, the palace was a "children's paradise" with its long passageways, a helicopter pad, and many outdoor gardens, including one on the roof where the family spent many hours.

Several notable courtiers live or have lived at The Old Barracks building, on the southern end of the palace. Notable residents include: Paul Burrell, Princess Diana's butler; Sir Miles Hunt-Davies, Private Secretary to Prince Philip; Lady Jane Fellowes, Diana's sister, and her husband Robert Fellowes, Baron Fellowes, Private Secretary to the Queen. Diana's interview with Martin Bashir for the BBC's Panorama programme was recorded in Diana's sitting room at the palace. In February 1987, a thief wearing a ski mask hit police guards with a hammer while in the gardens but did not get inside the palace, where Prince Charles, Diana and other royals were sleeping.

Upon Diana's death on 31 August 1997, the gates at Kensington Palace became the focus of public mourning with over one million bouquets, reaching 5 feet (1.5 m) deep in places, placed as tribute before them stretching out into Kensington Gardens. The Princess's coffin spent its last night in London at the palace. On the morning of 6 September 1997, a tenor bell signalled the departure of the funeral cortège carrying the coffin from the palace on a gun carriage to Westminster Abbey for the ceremony. Her residence was stripped bare and lay vacant for 10 years after her death. It was split back into two apartments, with Apartment 8 being used by four of Charles's charities and Apartment 9 becoming home to the Chief of the Defence Staff.

==== 21st century ====
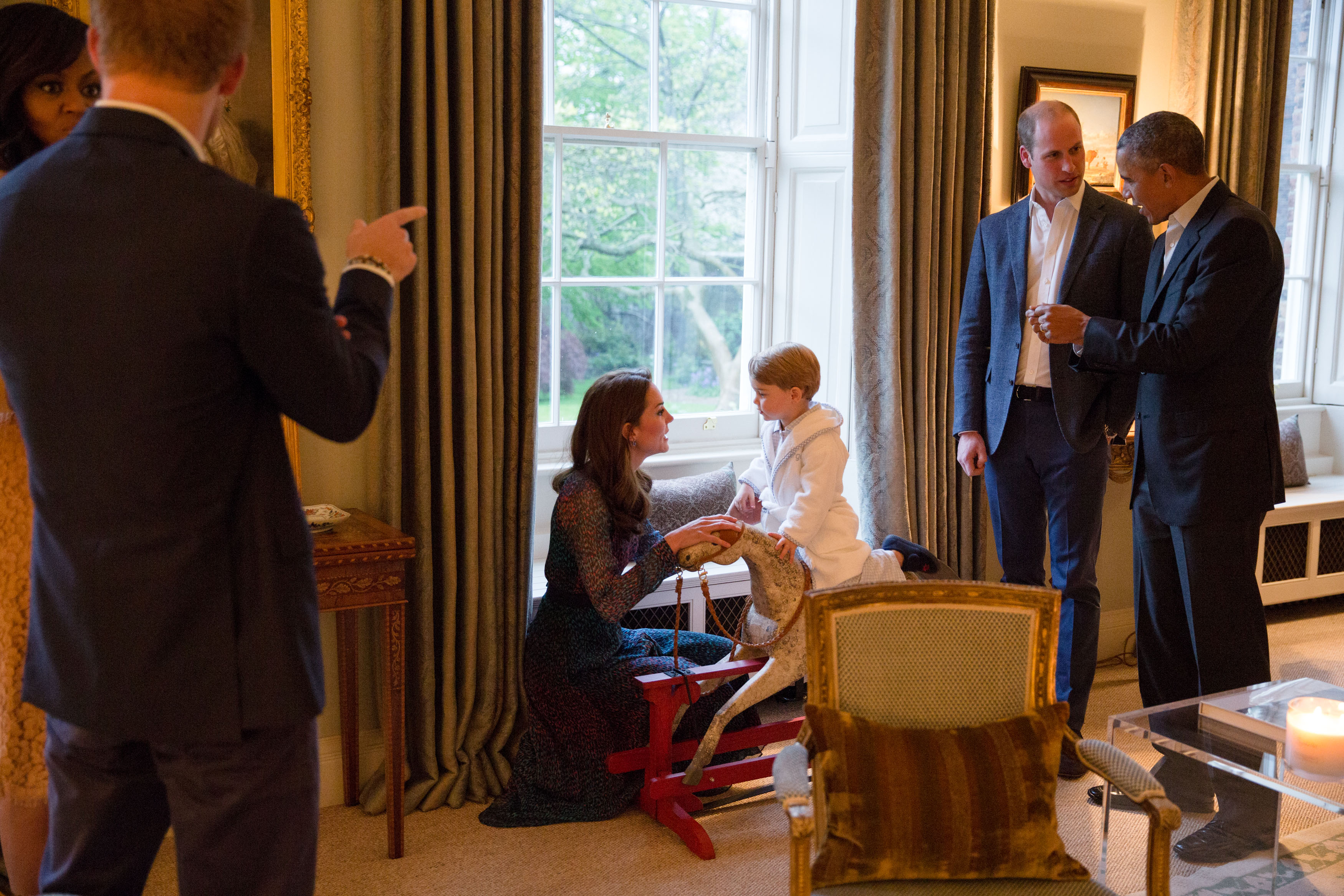
The Duke and Duchess of Cambridge, who resided in Apartment 1A, at the palace with Prince George and Prince Harry during a visit from President Barack Obama and First Lady Michelle Obama

Following their marriage in 2011, the then-Duke and Duchess of Cambridge used Nottingham Cottage as their London residence. They then moved into the four-storey, 20-room Apartment 1A, the former residence of Princess Margaret, in 2013. Renovations took 18 months at a cost of £4.5 million, including new heating, electrics and plastering, and the removal of asbestos that required nearly everything to be stripped out internally, as well as a new roof.

Kensington Palace became the Duke and Duchess's main residence in 2017, moving from their country home, Anmer Hall. The apartment covers four storeys, with three bedrooms, two nurseries and five reception rooms. In 2016, Diana's former residence, Apartment 8, was turned into office space for the couple's staff, official duties and charity work. The Duke and Duchess have hosted multiple engagements, receptions, and meetings at the palace.

On 28 March 2012, it was announced that Prince Harry had moved his residence from Clarence House to a one-bedroom apartment at Kensington Palace. From 2013, he resided at Nottingham Cottage. The Duke and Duchess of Sussex continued to live at the property until the birth of their son in spring 2019.

In April 2018, Princess Eugenie moved from St James's Palace into Ivy Cottage at Kensington Palace. She lived there with her husband Jack Brooksbank until November 2020. In September 2019, the Duke and Duchess of Gloucester, previously residents of Apartment 1, moved to the Old Stables, a smaller home located within the palace's estate. In summer 2022, the Prince and Princess of Wales moved their family residence to Adelaide Cottage near Windsor Castle. Kensington Palace remains their official London residence as well as the location of their household and offices.

== Interior and grounds ==
Kensington Palace contains public and private apartments and residences within the building and its grounds. The palace houses a total of fifty residents. Apart from members of the royal family, it also hosts members of the military, courtiers, staff, and citizens who pay market rent.

=== King and Queen's State Apartments ===
The King's and Queen's State Apartments are state rooms and private apartments historically used by various monarchs and consorts. The King's State Apartments were used for diplomatic audiences and meetings, described as "opulent" and "surprisingly sparse". The Queen's State Apartments were a domestic residence typically used by consorts to live in and entertain. The state apartments were first opened to the public in 1899. The museum closed intermittently during the conflicts of the First and Second World Wars before reopening permanently in 1949.

The entryway to the King's State Apartments is marked by the King's Staircase, decorated with a painting by William Kent depicting George I's royal court, completed in 1724. The apartment possesses several reception rooms. The Presence Chamber features a limewood fireplace where the monarch received ministers. The Privy Chamber was one of Queen Caroline's favourite entertaining spaces. The Cupola Room has been described as the "most splendidly decorated room in the palace", also by Kent.

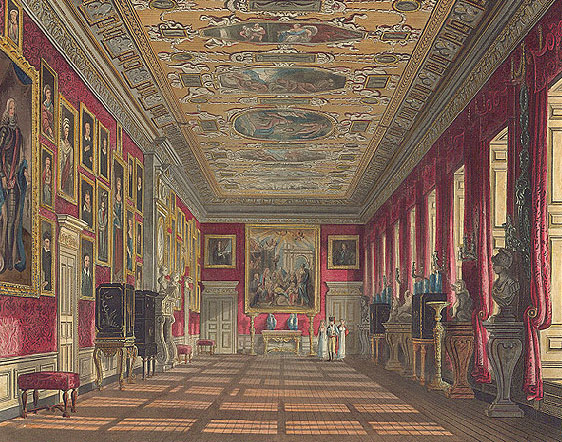
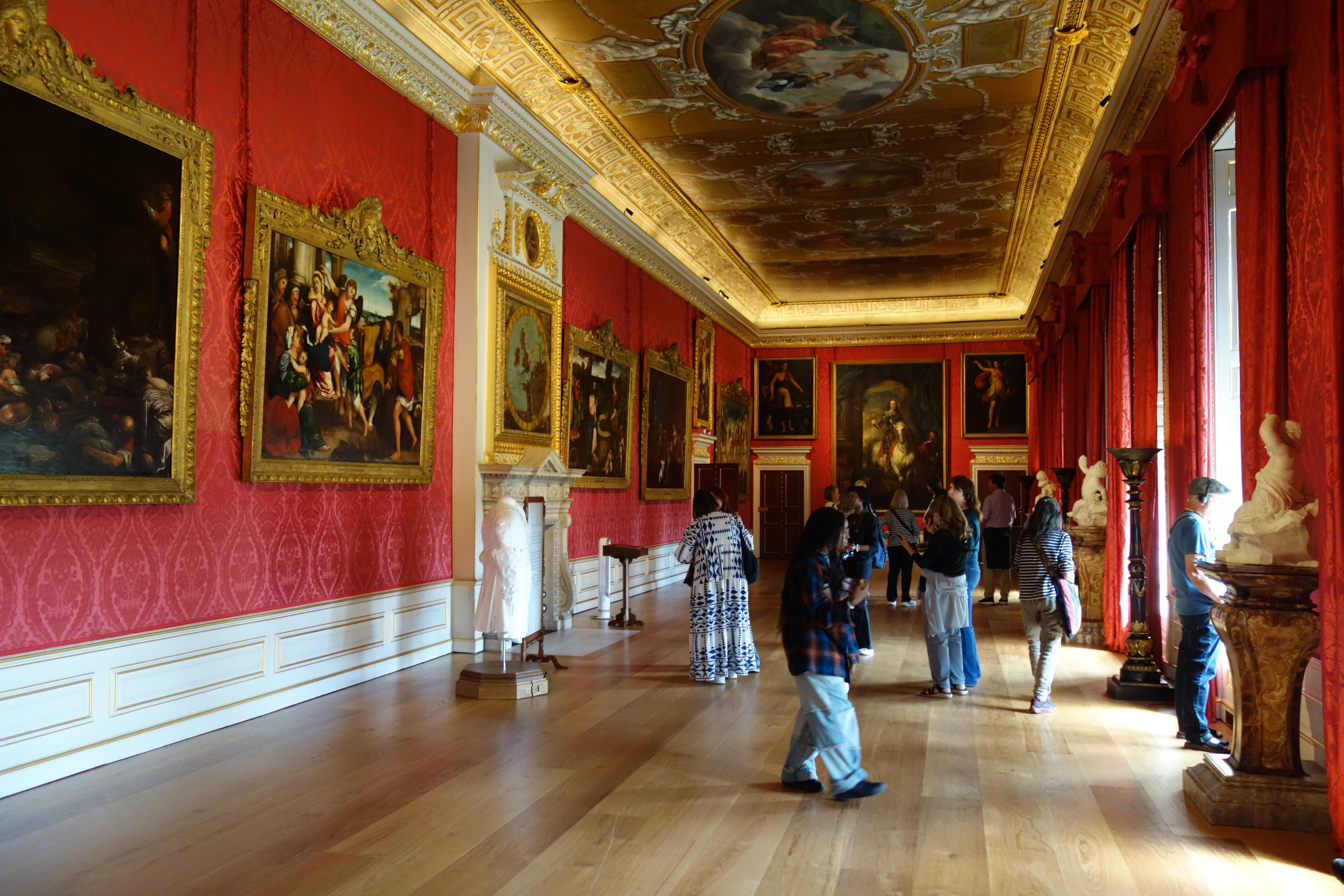
The King's Gallery in the 19th century and the 21st century

The King's Drawing Room, where courtiers would come "in search of power and patronage", features a copy of Venus and Cupid by Giorgio Vasari, which Caroline attempted to have removed to no avail. The King's Gallery, built for William III, is decorated with red accents and golden ornaments, used for exercise and displaying paintings. Featuring numerous works by Kent, it houses Charles I at the Hunt by Anthony van Dyck.

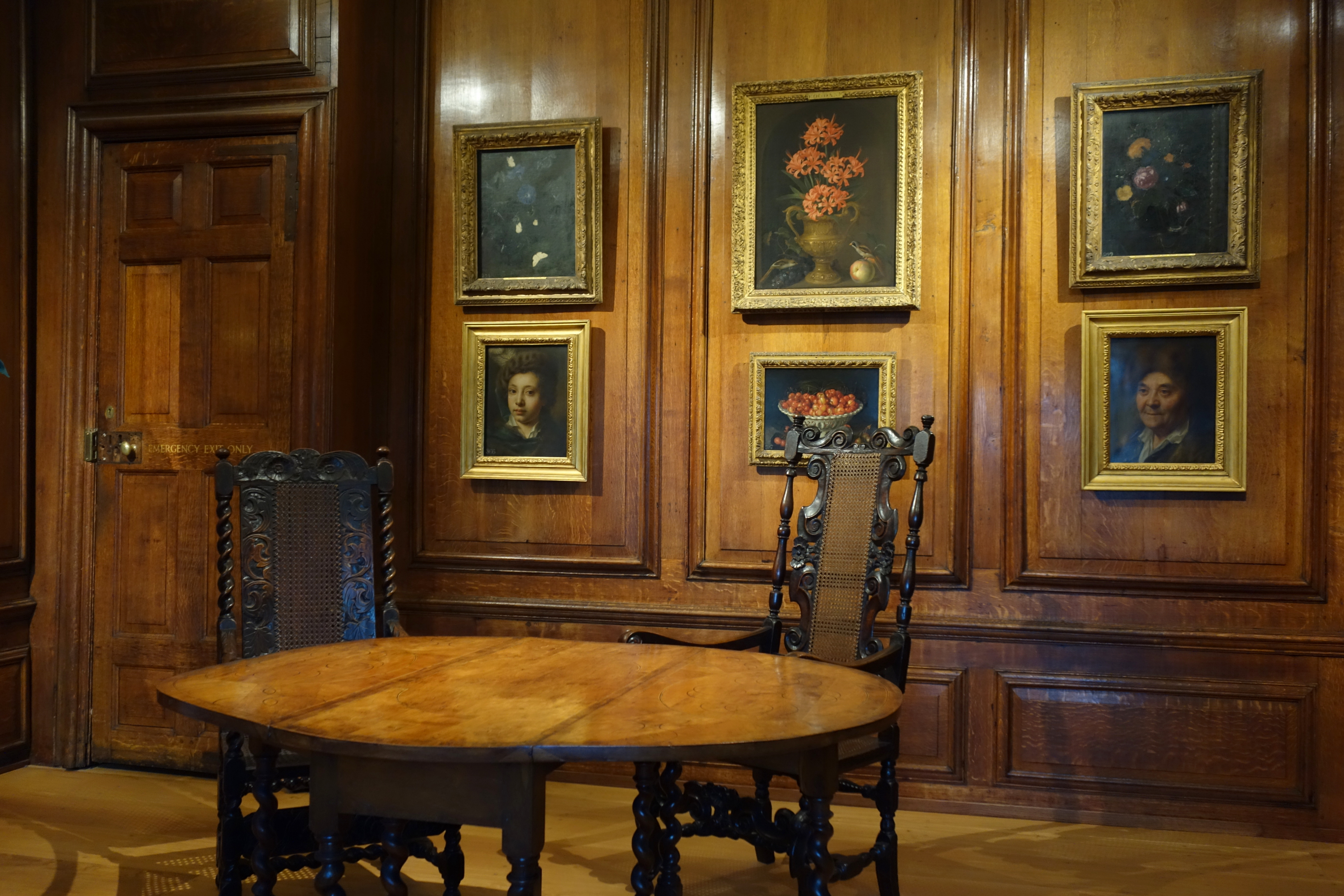
Queen's Dining Room

The Queen's State Apartments consist of the rooms where Mary II and later royal consorts resided. The Queen's Staircase is "deliberately plainer" than its counterpart, accessible to the gardens. The Queen's Gallery, built in 1693, was previously filled with Turkish carpets and oriental artifacts, and was designed as a place for Mary to fulfil "simple pastimes such as walking, reading, and needlework." The Queen's Dining Room is where Mary and William would take their meals together in private, featuring 17th-century panelling. The Queen's Drawing Room features décor from China and Japan, and features William and Mary's intertwined monogram carved into the crown moulding. Mary's bedroom, where she entertained friends, is included in the apartments.

=== Apartments 1 and 1A ===
Apartment 1 today occupies the south-west corner of Kensington Palace, taking in much of Sir Christopher Wren's south range. Prior to the mid-1950's this Apartment spanned the parts of the Palace today known as Apartment 1 and Apartment 1A. Comprising roughly forty inter-connected rooms arranged over four storeys, the principal elevations of the original Apartment faced Kensington Gardens and Palace Green. Although designated an "apartment", the accommodation is effectively a substantial terraced house built around a section of Wren's Stone Gallery and reached by its own porte-cochère.

The apartment was created for Prince Augustus Frederick, Duke of Sussex, who took up residence at Apartment 1 in 1805. Following the Duke of Sussex's death in 1843, his morganatic widow Cecilia Underwood, Duchess of Inverness retained the rooms until her own death in 1873. The Duke of Sussex's tenure was marked by the creation of an extensive library that eventually filled several chambers of the suite. By the end of the Duke's life, one wing had entirely been given over to a "Divinity Room" holding more than 5,000 Bibles, and corridors rang hourly with the chimes of the duke's extensive clock collection.

The next occupant of the Apartment was Queen Victoria's daughter Princess Louise, Duchess of Argyll, who combined smaller rooms to create larger saloons and converted one of the Duke's libraries into an art studio. Increasingly reclusive in her later life, Princess Louise continued to occupy Apartment 1 until her death in 1939. The apartment was left vacant and neglected for the following 15 years.

==== Apartment 1: 1954 - Present ====
In 1954 the widowed Princess Marina, Duchess of Kent was granted part of the original Apartment 1 as a permanent grace-and-favour residence in London. During their marriage the London home of Princess Marina and Prince George, Duke of Kent had been No. 3 Belgrave Square. After Prince George's death in 1942, Princess Marina often stayed with her mother-in-law Queen Mary at the latter's London Residence at Marlborough House; however the old Queen's death in 1953 had created a need for Marina to have a London base on her own.

As the original Apartment 1 was deemed too large for Marina's needs, its eastern half was divided to create Apartment 1A. The budget for the conversion and renovation works was budgeted at £80,000 but ultimately cost £127,000. During the works, Marina was reportedly on the verge of removing an original Wren staircase inside Apartment 1, finding it "too much like a servant's staircase", and too narrow for descending in full evening dress; the staircase was preserved after palace officials intervened to prevent its destruction. Princess Marina and her three children took up residence in October 1955, and Apartment 1 continued to be Princess Marina's home until her death in 1968.

Following the division of Apartment 1A, the principal rooms of Apartment 1 look north-west over Kensington Gardens, and its porte-cochère entrance opens toward Kensington Palace Gardens ("Billionaires Row") across Palace Green. Post-1955 alterations for Princess Marina retained part of Wren's Stone Gallery as an entrance corridor leading to an inner hall hung with a Philip de László portrait of her mother. A sitting-room opened through French doors onto a private walled garden; an adjoining office served both Marina and her private secretary, while the principal drawing-room was fitted with eighteenth-century furniture, chintz coverings, and objets d'art by Fabergé. Bedrooms and dressing-rooms were arranged on the second floor, with household offices and staff quarters confined to the basement.

Following Princess Marina's death in 1968, it was announced in November 1969 that Prince Henry, Duke of Gloucester and his wife would take up residence at Apartment 1. They had previously lived at York House, St James's Palace; justification for the Gloucesters' relocation was provided by a Palace spokesperson, who was quoted in contemporary newspapers as stating "York House is a large and unwieldy house for present-day use. The apartment at Kensington Palace is much more compact, modernised and easier to run." The couple's recently married younger son Prince Richard of Gloucester also used at the Apartment from 1972. Following Prince Henry's death in 1974, Alice continued to occupy the Apartment until her own death in 2004, and in 2019 Prince Richard and his family relocated to a smaller apartment in the Old Stables Building. Following the departure of the Gloucester family, it was speculated that Apartment 1 was intended to become the London residence of Prince Harry, Duke of Sussex and Meghan, Duchess of Sussex.

==== Apartment 1A ====
Apartment 1A is a royal residence, covering four storeys, with twenty rooms total. It has five reception rooms, each with fireplaces, as well as three bedrooms, dressing rooms and two nurseries. The upper level has nine staff bedrooms, while the basement holds a luggage room, gym, and laundry quarters. There are three kitchens, one for family use and two for the staff. The residence overlooks a large, walled-in garden, hidden from public view in the palace's museum wing by frosted windows.

Princess Margaret occupied apartment 1A overseeing its renovation and redesign, taking up residence with her husband Lord Snowden in 1965 until her death in 2002.

The entrance hall has intricate crown moulding and black-and-white tiling. The apartment features art and furnishings from the Royal Collection. The Duchess of Cambridge decorated the space with furniture from IKEA, with the interior featuring "warm beiges and floral pillows", gold trim upholstery, and detailed carpeting.

=== Apartment 2 ===
Apartment 2 was a spacious suite adjoining the rooms that once housed the Duke of Sussex and, later, Princess Louise (now designated Apartment 1A). In 1798 the several unused and vacant parts of the palace, located immediately below the former State Apartments in the south-east corner of the main palace complex, were merged into an apartment which was granted to Prince Edward, Duke of Kent and Strathearn. The Apartment was where his only child Princess Victoria of Kent was born in 1819.

After the Duke of Kent's death, his widow the Duchess of Kent continued to live in this Apartment until Victoria's accession in 1837. Queen Victoria later assigned the apartment to her cousin Princess Mary Adelaide, Duchess of Teck in 1867; a ground-floor plan reproduced in her 1900 biography shows that the suite then occupied much of the ground floor of the south-east corner of the Palace, which now forms part of section of the Palace containing the State Rooms. The Tecks' first child Princess Victoria Mary of Teck (later Queen Mary) was born here shortly after the family's arrival at the Palace; the Tecks later surrendered the apartment in 1883.

From 1896 this part of the Palace was occupied by Queen Victoria's youngest daughter, Princess Beatrice of the United Kingdom following the death of her husband, Prince Henry of Battenberg. Palace servants later recalled evenings when Beatrice and her neighbour Princess Louise could be heard shouting at each other through the adjoining wall of their respective Apartments. Beatrice remained in residence until her death in 1944.

=== Apartment 4 ===
Located in the north-west corner of the Clock Court, Apartment 4 was occupied by Maria Chaine from 1867 to 1915. Chaine had been granted the largely honorary post of State Housekeeper of the Palace, and was a daughter of Charles Beaumont Phipps, who had served as Prince Albert's private secretary from 1847 until the Prince's death in 1861. Another of Phipps' daughters, Harriet Phipps, who had served as a lady-in-waiting to Queen Victoria, resided in Apartment 7 until her own death in 1922.

Following Chaine's death in 1915, Apartment 4 was then occupied by Queen Victoria's widowed daughter-in-law The Dowager Duchess of Albany from 1917 until her death in 1922. The Clock House Apartment subsequently was used as the London Home for the late Duchess of Albany's daughter Princess Alice, Countess of Athlone from 1923 until her own death in 1981. The apartment was severely damaged by a fire during the Blitz in October 1940. In her later years, it was reportedly not uncommon for Princess Alice to answer the door of her Kensington Palace apartment herself. Apartment 4 remained uninhabited for the following ten years, and subsequent structural repairs were undertaken at a cost of nearly £1,000,000. The apartment which Princess Alice had occupied had been split into multiple separate residences in the 1990s.

Apartment 4A was occupied by Sir John Tiltman, Director of Property Services, until 2004, and later by General Sir Richard Dannatt during the late 2000s to early 2010s.

In 2002 the "Tower Flat" was occupied by Major Nicholas Barne, Private Secretary to The Duke of Gloucester.

Apartment 4B was occupied by the Royal Household's Directory of Property Services Sir Michael Peat (later Keeper of the Privy Purse and Private Secretary to the Prince of Wales) from the late 1990s to 2011. The apartment was also reportedly later occupied as a temporary residence by Prince Harry of Wales during the early 2010s. Sources conflict regarding the size of Apartment 4B, which has been described both as a modest one-bedroom apartment, and also as a "six-bedroom apartment".

=== Apartment 5 ===
Located in the section of the Palace situated south of the Princess Court and north of the Clock Court, Apartment 5 forms part of a suite of rooms which originally comprised a much larger apartment which included Apartment 10 and the rooms beneath Queen Mary's Gallery. This large apartment was occupied by Caroline, Princess of Wales from 1808 to 1814, and later by Princess Sophia from 1820 until her death in 1848. The rooms which would later form part of Apartment 5 were later merged into Apartment 2, from which they were subsequently subdivided in 1884; they then became the home of Antoinette Moncrieff until her death in 1937.

In late 1937 Apartment 5 was subsequently granted to The Hon. Sir Derek Keppel and his wife Bridget, Lady Keppel. Sir Derek had served as Master of the Household from 1912 until 1936, and was a brother-in-law of King Edward VII's mistress Alice Keppel. The Keppels were forced to evacuate the Palace as a result of extensive bombing damage in 1940; Sir Derek died in 1944, and Lady Keppel died in 1951.

=== Apartment 6 ===
Apartment 6, located on the western side of the Prince of Wales's Court, has long been one of the smallest grace-and-favour apartments in Kensington Palace. This apartment was the home of the Palace Chaplain from 1830 to 1901, and then Queen Victoria's Dresser during the early 20th century. No. 6 was later joined to the neighbouring Apartment 7, home of the Dowager Marchioness of Milford Haven, from 1925 to 1950.

By 2002 No. 6 had been split into several smaller flats; Apartment 6 was reportedly occupied by Harold Brown, Butler to Princess Margaret. Apartment 6A was used by Tony Rabey, Butler to The Prince of Wales, whilst Apartment 6C did not have a permanent occupant, but occasionally used by The Prince of Wales' Chef and Drivers.

=== Apartment 7 ===
Located in the north-west corner of the main palace complex, the part of the Palace which would become Apartment 7 formed part of the Kensington Palace Chapel during the 19th century; the chapel was decommissioned in 1901. Following this, a false ceiling was inserted to allow the first-floor apartments to be enlarged. This apartment was the home of former Lady-in-Waiting to Queen Victoria Harriet Phipps. Following Phipps' death in 1922, No. 7 became the home of Victoria Mountbatten, Dowager Marchioness of Milford Haven, who was a granddaughter of Queen Victoria as well as maternal grandmother of Prince Philip, Duke of Edinburgh. No. 7 was one of the Apartments severely damaged by a fire on 14 October 1940 during the Blitz.

Lt. Philip Mountbatten and his cousin David Mountbatten, 3rd Marquess of Milford Haven lived with their grandmother in her Kensington Palace home during the three months prior to his wedding to Princess Elizabeth in November 1947; it was from Apartment 7 that Philip embarked to Westminster Abbey on the morning of his wedding day.

After Lady Milford Haven's death in 1950, use of her apartment was given to Mary, Duchess of Beaufort and her husband Henry Somerset, 10th Duke of Beaufort in 1953. Through her father Adolphus Cambridge, 1st Marquess of Cambridge, the Duchess of Beaufort had been born Princess Mary of Teck, rendering her both the niece and namesake of Queen Mary, as well as a first-cousin once-removed of the-then Queen Elizabeth II. The Duke of Beaufort was a long-serving Member of the Royal Household, serving as Master of the Horse from 1936 to 1978. Apartment 7 continued to be their home until the late 1970s; following the Duke's retirement in 1978 much of the artwork and furniture from their Kensington Palace apartment was sold via auction in May 1979. The Duke and Duchess of Beaufort died in 1984 and 1987 respectively. Apartment 7 next became the home of Official Office of Diana, Princess of Wales following her divorce from Charles, Prince of Wales in 1996.

=== Apartment 8 ===
One of the earliest recorded occupants of the section of the palace now known as Apartment 8 was Lt Gen William Wynyard, who was granted use of this suite of rooms from 1792 until his death in 1819. Following the death of long-serving Cabinet Minister Granville Leveson-Gower, 2nd Earl Granville in 1892, his widow Castilia, Dowager Countess Granville was offered a suite of Apartments at Kensington Palace by Queen Victoria in 1892, reportly in recognition of her husband's significant public service. Lady Granville retained the suite of rooms, which would later be known as Apartment 8, until her death in 1938.

The now-vacant No. 8 was soon granted to the-then King George V's cousin Lady Patricia Ramsey (formerly Princess Patricia of Connaught) in July 1939. No. 8 was amongst those damaged by fire in October 1940 during the Blitz.

=== Apartment 9 ===
Lady Bertha Dawkins, a long-serving Lady-in-Waiting to Queen Mary was granted a grace-and-favour apartment at the Palace in 1926. By 1940 Lady Bertha's Apartment was known as Apartment 9; this was the site where a bomb hit the Palace during the Blitz in 1940, which caused significant fire damage to the complex; Lady Bertha died in 1943 before repairs to her apartment could be completed. In 1954 The Queen granted Apartment 9 to the recently retired Master of the Household Sir Piers Legh; however, before Legh had the opportunity to move in to the Apartment both he and his wife Lady Legh died within a few hours of each other on 16 and 17 October 1955. In 1966 approximately £42,000 was spent on roof repairs at Apartment 9, which had reportedly been unoccupied for several years.

==== Apartments 8 & 9: Home of the Prince and Princess of Wales ====
Between 1975 and 1981, Apartments 8 and 9 underwent substantial restoration after prolonged postwar neglect. Originally left in a derelict state with collapsed ceilings and structural water damage, the apartments had been patched with corrugated roofing and remained unoccupied for decades. The renovation aimed to restore the Georgian character of the north-west wing while updating it for modern habitation.

The project, which cost £900,000 and spanned six years, was complicated by the absence of architectural plans. Restoration relied on historical photographs, including a 1928 Country Life article and government records documenting bomb damage during the Second World War. Some original features, such as William Kent plasterwork, had been destroyed or removed, requiring reproduction or simplification of decorative elements. Despite these challenges, the main staircase and other Georgian-style interiors were reconstructed to a high standard, preserving the building's historic aesthetic.

During its use as the Wales' London residence, the two-room nursery covered the entirety of the top floor. Other spaces included two reception rooms: a drawing room doubling as Diana's office, a sitting room with a television, and a formal dining room. The residence had access to a helicopter pad, and several outdoor gardens, including one on the roof and a greenhouse where the family spent many hours. Diana decorated the residence in "bold patterns and lush fabrics", as well as floral wallpaper and a mix of modern and antique furniture, upholstered with golden lacquer. From 1997, the apartments have been used as office space for various groups, charities, and staff.

=== Apartment 10 ===
Apartment 10 is a residence situated in the north-east section of the palace, near the public gardens. Apartment 10 forms part of a suite of rooms which originally comprised a much larger apartment which included Apartment 5 and the rooms beneath Queen Mary's Gallery. This apartment was used by Caroline, Princess of Wales from 1808 to 1814, and later by Princess Sophia from 1820 until her death in 1848.

The three-storey apartment holds five bedrooms and five reception rooms. The Apartment was the home of Queen Victoria's grandson Alexander Mountbatten, 1st Marquess of Carisbrooke from 1956 until his death in 1960. The Apartment was later occupied by Princess Margaret and her husband during the early days of their marriage whilst the larger Apartment 1A underwent extensive renovations; the Princess described No. 10 as "the doll's house". The apartment has been the London home of Prince and Princess Michael of Kent since 1978.

=== Wren House ===
Named for architect Christopher Wren, Wren House residence is near a cluster of cottages on the grounds of the palace, located north of the main building. It has five bedrooms and five reception rooms. The cottage covers two storeys, and has been noted as one of the more modest residences within the palace. Wren House is said to have the "best view" of the palace's walled gardens.

=== Nottingham Cottage ===
Nottingham Cottage is a residence near a cluster of cottages on the grounds of the palace, located north of the main building. Described as a "cosy property", it contains two bedrooms, two reception rooms, and a small garden.

=== Ivy Cottage ===
Ivy Cottage is a residence near a cluster of cottages on the grounds of the palace, located north of the main building. The cottage holds three bedrooms. While in residence, Princess Eugenie was reported to have renovated the residence and "brightened the cottage up with lots of pops of colour" and various art pieces.

=== Old Stables ===
The Old Stables is a residence near a cluster of cottages on the grounds of the palace, located north of the main building. During Sir Alan Lascelles' occupation, it was described as "lavishly decorated". During the residence of Prince Richard, Duke of Gloucester and Birgitte, Duchess of Gloucester, the house was decorated with "old wooden furniture" and "bright turquoise walls".

=== King's Kitchen Cottages and the Upper Lodge ===
The King's Kitchen Cottages and Upper Lodge make up staff residences.

=== Chapel ===
The Kensington Palace Chapel was built in the 1830s, used for private family services and occasions. Described as the "heart" of the palace, it was converted into residential space before being restored as a chapel by a conservation company in 2002. The space is approximately 9 metres long, including a "variety of antique features" and oak wall panelling. Renaissance era art pieces from the Royal Collection adorn the room, alongside a 19th-century brass hung chandelier. Family events that have taken place at the chapel include the 2004 wedding of Lady Davina Windsor, and the 2015 christening of Isabella Windsor, daughter of Lord Frederick Windsor and Lady Frederick Windsor.

== As a tourist attraction/other uses ==
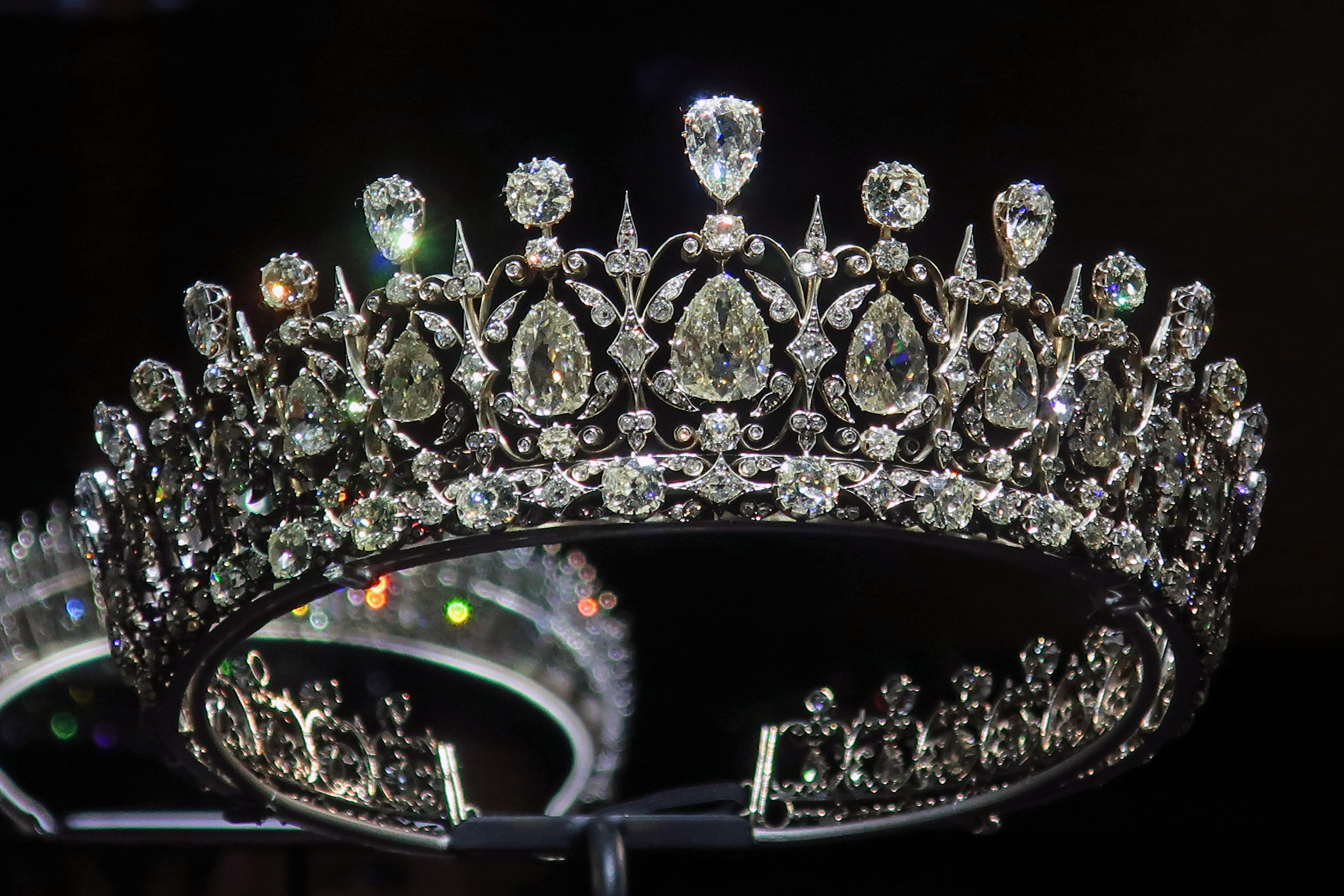
The Fife Tiara, a wedding present to Louise, Princess Royal from her groom Alexander Duff, 1st Duke of Fife in 1887, is one of many historic objects on public display at the palace.

By the end of the 19th century, the State Rooms were severely neglected. The brickwork was decaying and the woodwork was infested with dry rot. Calls were made for the palace to be demolished, but Queen Victoria declared that "while she lived, the palace in which she was born should not be destroyed". In 1897, Parliament was persuaded to pay for the restoration which was completed two years later. The State Rooms were opened to the public on the Queen's birthday, 24 May 1899. This began the palace's dual role as a private home to royalty and a public museum.

Queen Mary was instrumental in opening the State Apartments as a temporary location for the London Museum, from 1911 to 1914. The State Apartments were filled with showcases, some containing hundreds of objects including 18th-century costumes and dresses worn by Queen Victoria, Queen Alexandra and Queen Mary. The museum returned from 1950 to 1976 before it moved to its next home on London Wall.

In 1989 care for the Kensington Palace State Rooms was contracted out to Historic Royal Palaces Agency, a non-departmental public body, on behalf of the Department of the Environment. The arrangement was adjusted in 1998, when the agency became an independent charity called Historic Royal Palaces (HRP) and was contracted to the Secretary of State for National Heritage to manage this and other Royal sites; under the contract, HRP's is dependent on charitable giving, rather than government budgetary funding.

Under HRP the Kensington Palace State Rooms underwent a two-year, £12 million renovation, underwritten with contributions from the Heritage Lottery Fund as well as other public and private donations. New uniforms for staff were designed by Stuart Stockdale at Jaeger.

The re-opening of the palace occurred in time for the Diamond Jubilee of Queen Elizabeth II in 2012. The grounds of the palace were renovated with enhancements including eliminating railings, fences, and shrubs that had undermined royal gardener Charles Bridgeman's original landscaping. Two new public gardens to the south and east of the palace were installed that connect the property to Kensington Gardens. Visitors now can choose four different routes throughout the palace that offer exhibits incorporating cutting-edge digital presentations, interactive experiences, and audio sequences that bring to life the gatherings of gowns, antique furniture, and other memorabilia of notable residents of the palace. These include William and Mary in the Queen's State Apartments, the court of George I and II in the King's State Apartments, and the life of Queen Victoria in the rooms most associated with her.

The fourth exhibit previously displayed selections of Queen Elizabeth's wardrobe in the 1950s, Princess Margaret from the 1960s and 70s and Diana, Princess of Wales, in the 1980s during their fashion heyday. This exhibit was known as Dress Codes and was displayed from March to November 2025. Between March and November 2026, this space hosted The Last Princesses of Punjab exhibition, telling the story of Sophia Duleep Singh, goddaughter of Queen Victoria and suffragette.

The nearest tube stations are Queensway, Bayswater, High Street Kensington, or (slightly farther) Gloucester Road.

In October 2011, Disney, in cooperation with Historic Royal Palaces, hosted "Rapunzel's Royal Celebration" at Kensington Palace, a special event in which Rapunzel (Tangled) was inducted as the tenth official Disney Princess and crowned. All nine existing Princesses attended – title characters Snow White, Cinderella, Pocahontas, and Mulan, as well as Aurora (Sleeping Beauty), Ariel (The Little Mermaid), Belle (Beauty and the Beast), Jasmine (Aladdin), and Tiana (The Princess and the Frog). Each of them arrived by carriage in a procession that passed through Hyde Park. Other Disney characters who attended were the Fairy Godmother and Flynn Rider, who crowned Rapunzel. An estimated 10,000 people watched the procession, and over 100 girls from 25 countries attended the ceremony inside the palace. It was the second Disney Princess induction/coronation to take place outside the Disney Parks and Resorts, and the first to take place outside the United States.

== Gallery ==
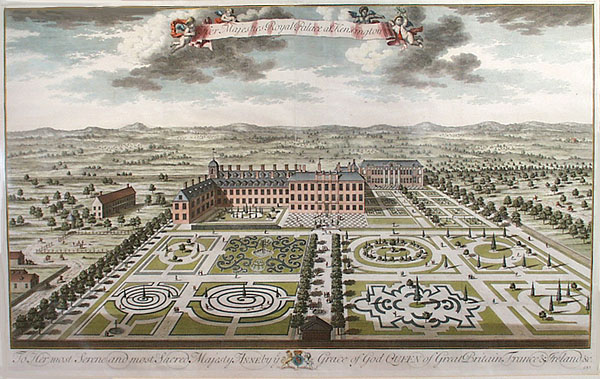
An engraving of Kensington Palace's south front, with its parterres, 1724

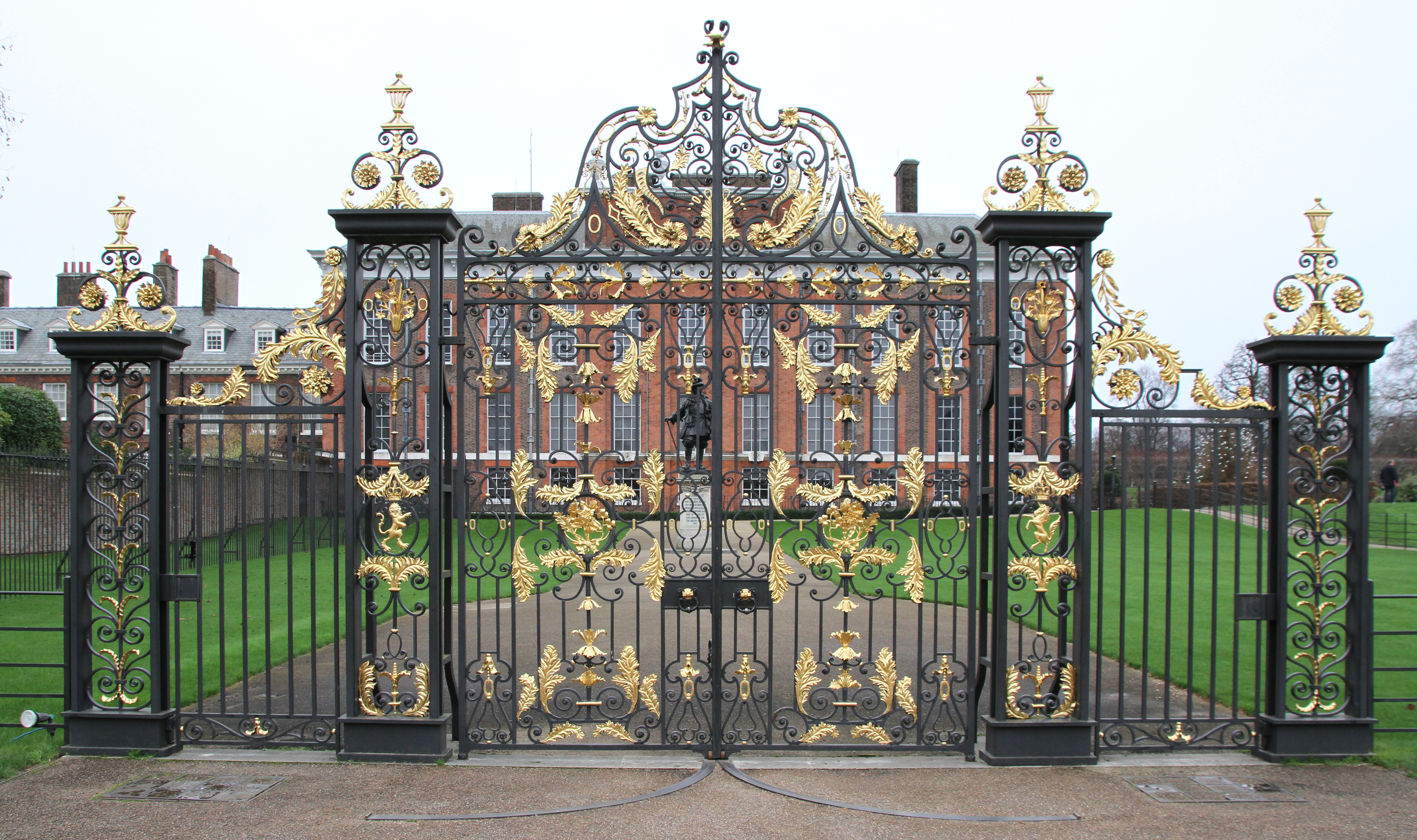
Gates to the Palace

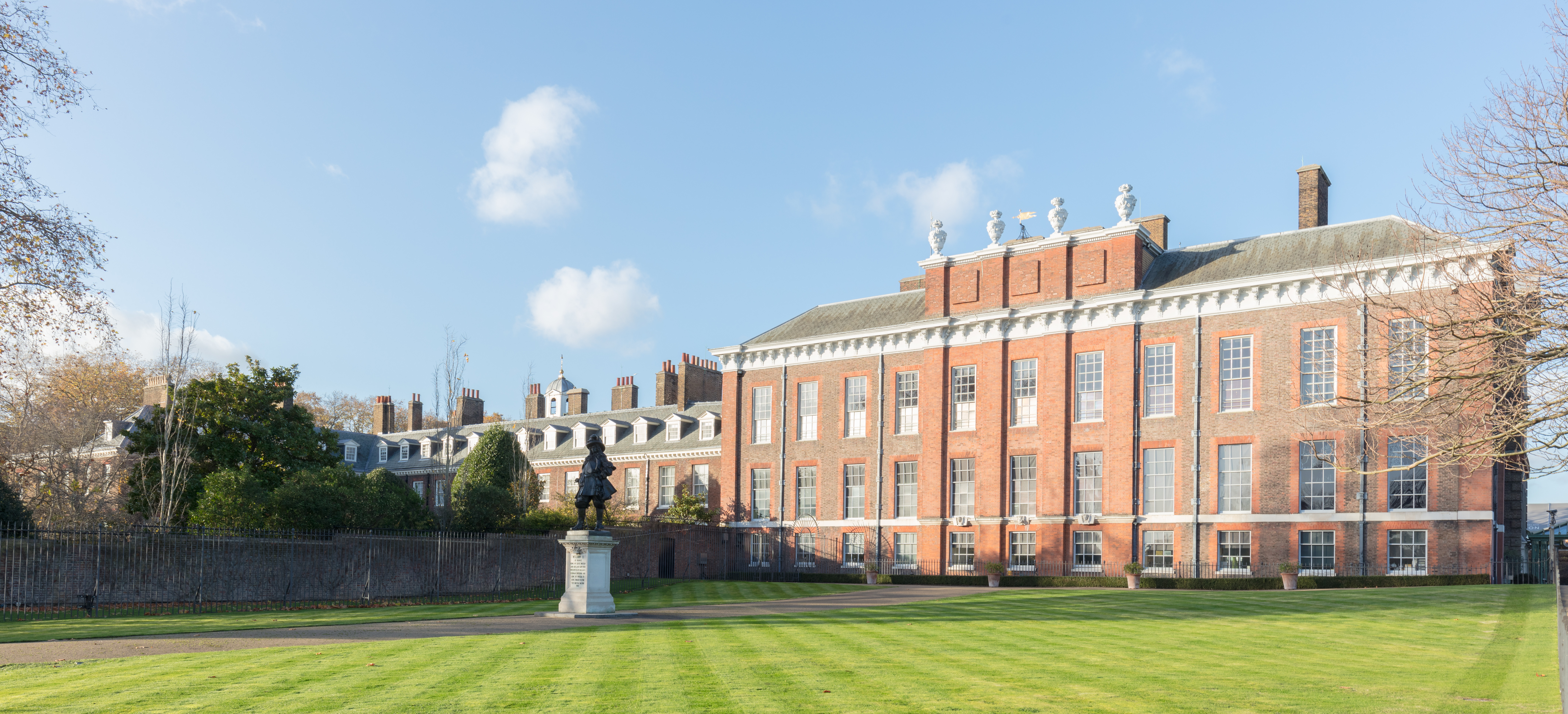
South front of the Palace, originally designed by Sir Christopher Wren and completed in 1718.

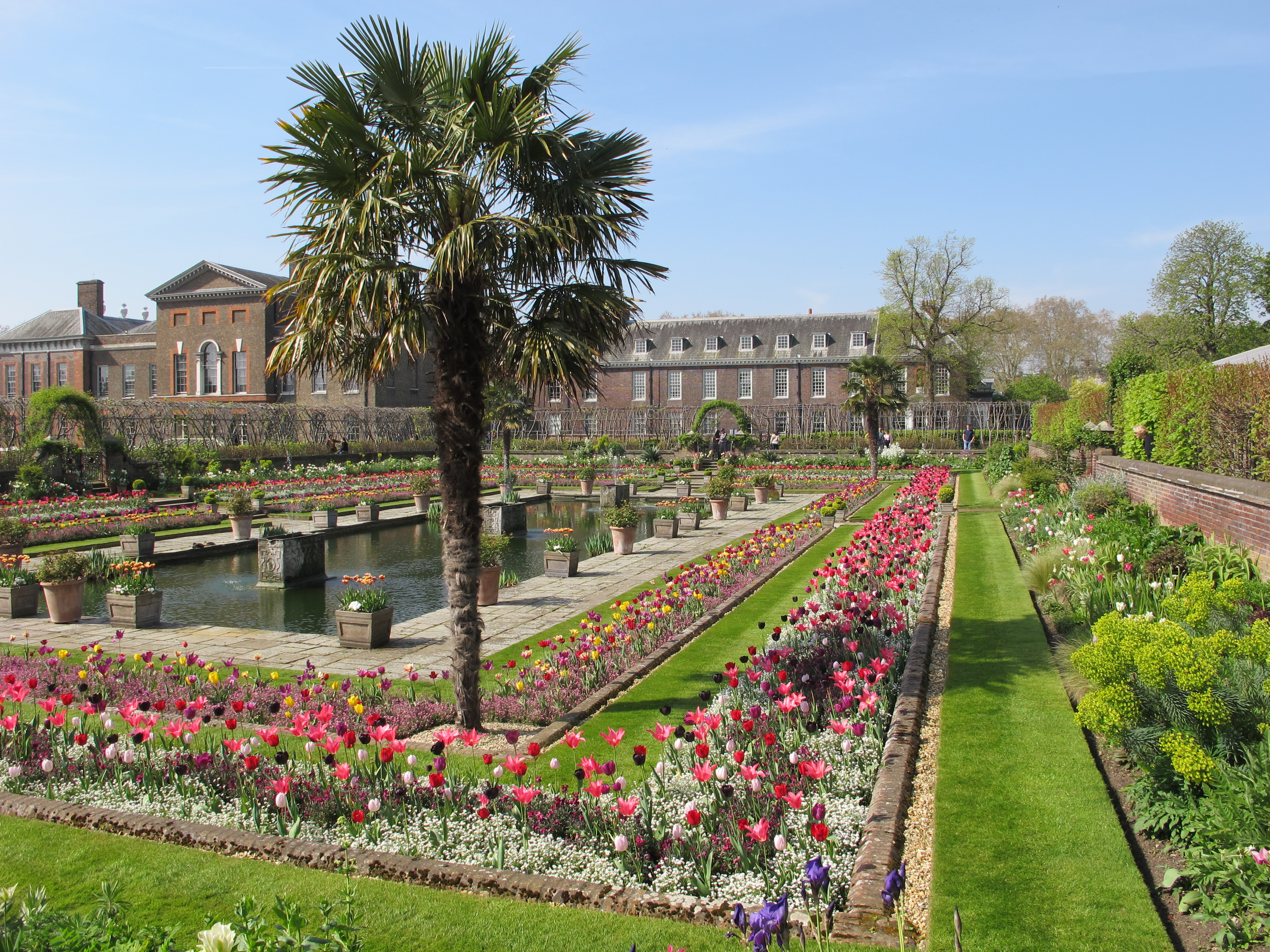
The Sunken Garden, planted with tulips.

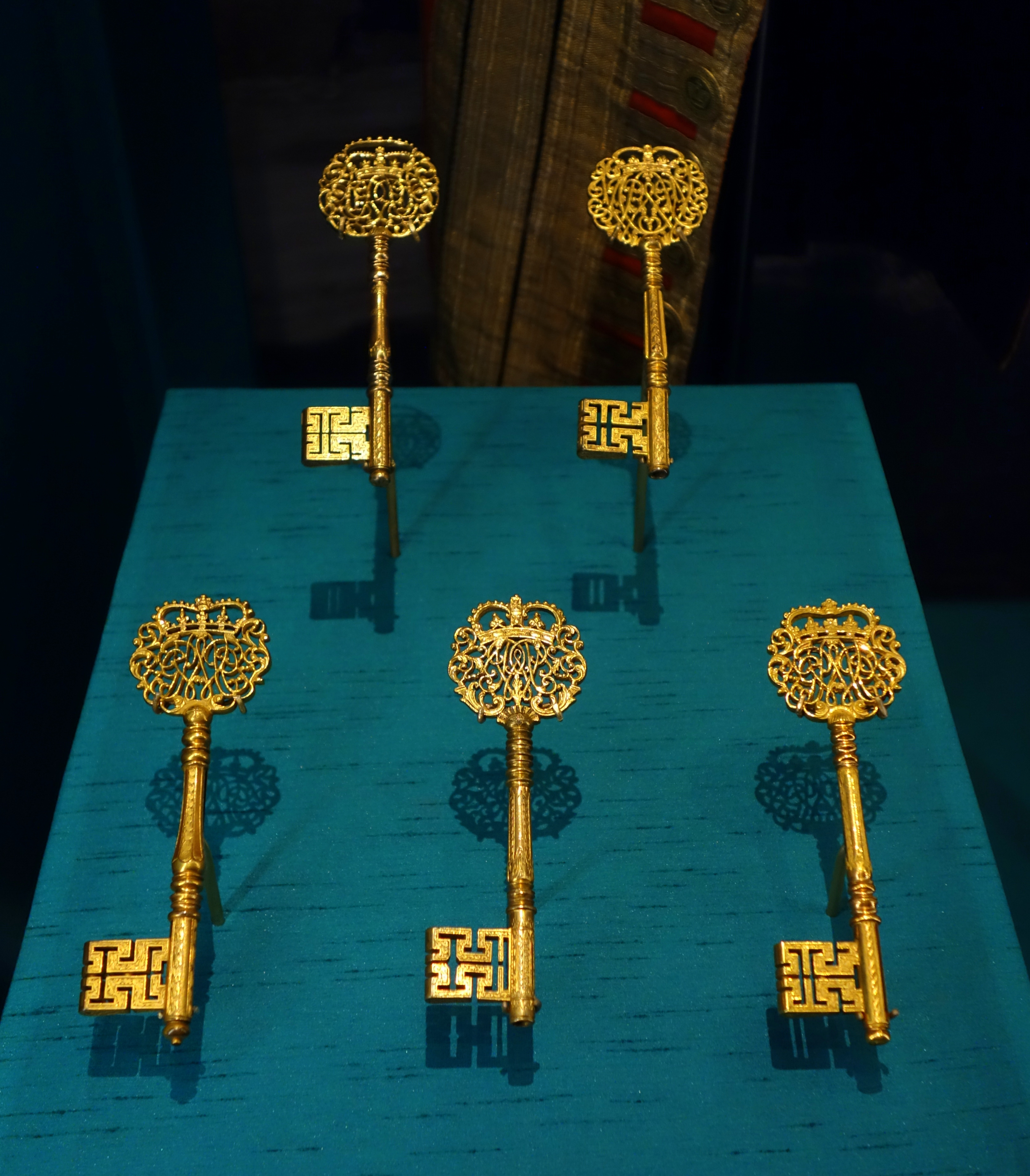
Lord Chamberlain's keys, attributed to Francis Bedwell, royal locksmith, mid-18th century, gilt bronze.

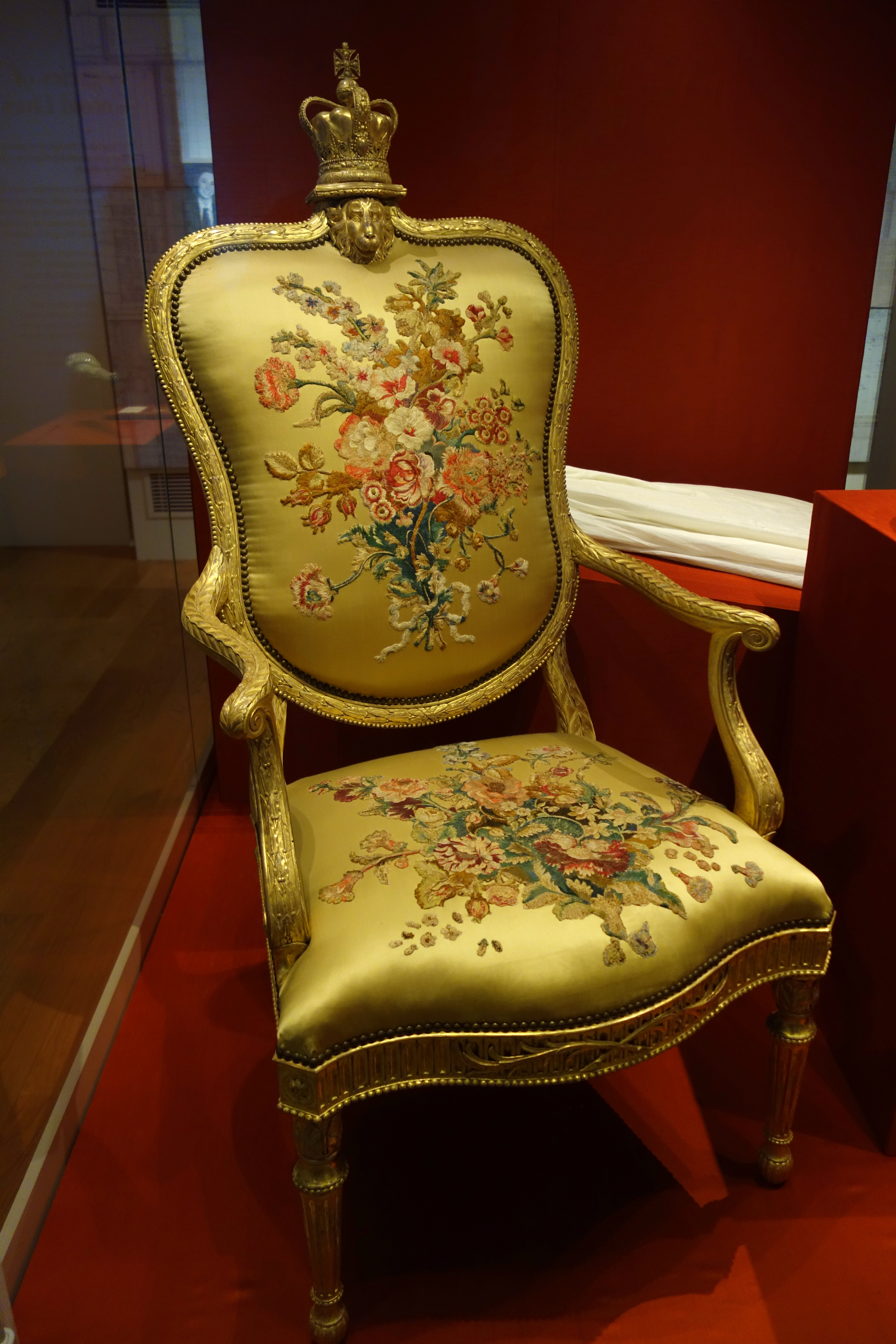
Armchair from Queen Charlotte's bedchamber suite, embroidered by Mrs Wright's Royal School for Embroidering Females, 1780s.

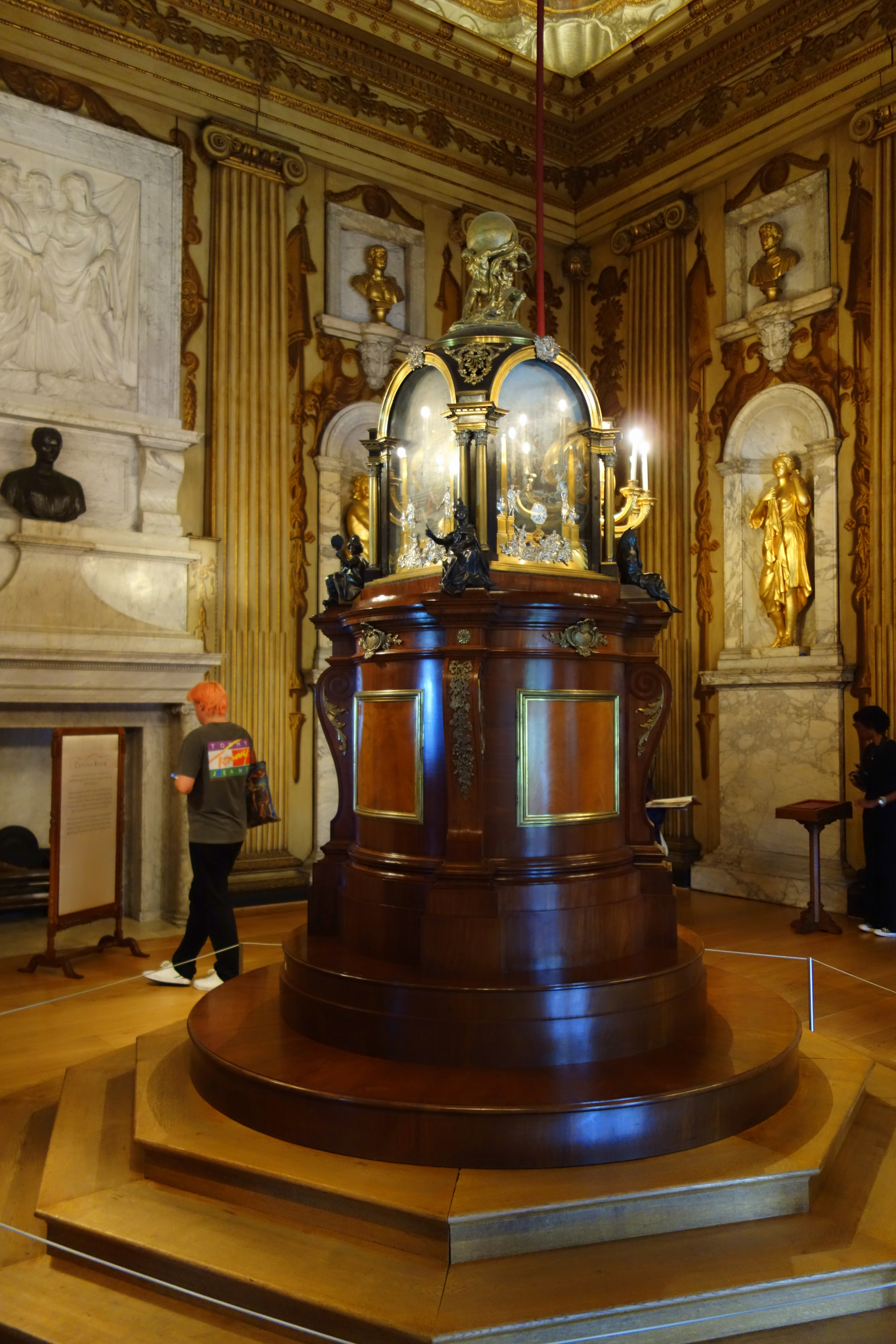
Floor standing clock, by Louis-Franc Roubiliac

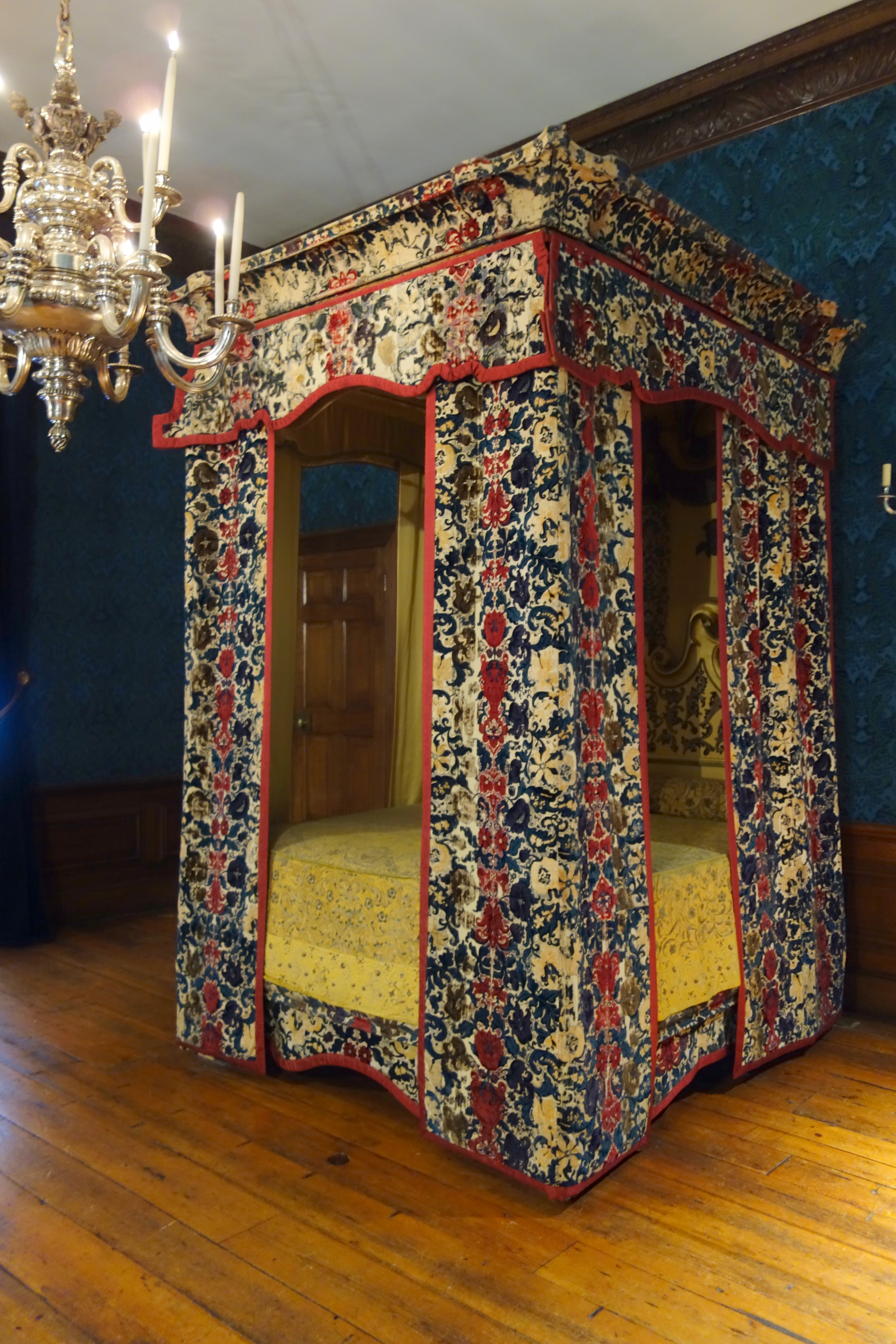
Canopy bed

== See also ==
- Kensington Gardens
- Kensington Palace Gardens
- Het Loo Palace in the Netherlands
- List of Baroque residences
- List of British royal residences
