= Ivy Cottage =

House in the grounds of Kensington Palace in London, England

Coordinates: 51°30′22″N 0°11′21″W

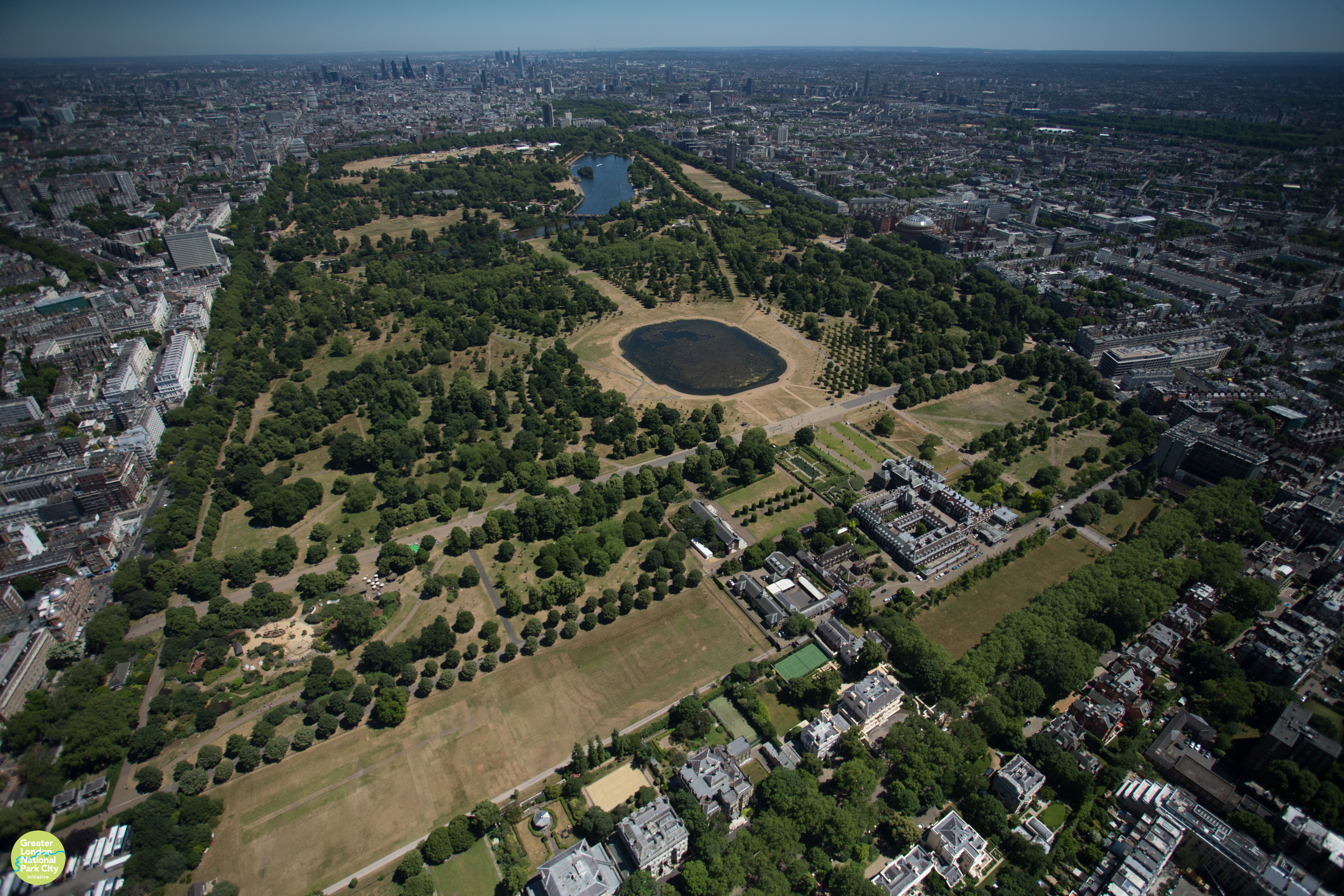
View of the Kensington Palace grounds, where Ivy Cottage is located

Cluster of outbuildings associated with Kensington Palace, including Ivy Cottage

Ivy Cottage is a house in the grounds of Kensington Palace in London, England. It is a grace-and-favour property, originally housing servants.

Princess Eugenie and her husband, Jack Brooksbank, resided in the cottage from April 2018 to November 2020. In May 2022, it was announced that they had once again taken up residence at the property and would divide their time between London and Portugal.
