= List of British royal residences =

British royal residences are palaces, castles and houses which are occupied by members of the British royal family in the United Kingdom. The current residences are owned by the Crown, by the Duchy of Cornwall, and privately by members of the royal family; all the official residences are owned by the Crown. Some official residences, such as the Palace of Holyroodhouse and Hillsborough Castle, serve primarily ceremonial functions and are used occasionally.

The occupied royal residences are cared for and maintained by the Property Section of the Royal Households of the United Kingdom. Public opening is overseen by the Royal Collection Trust. The unoccupied royal palaces of England, along with Hillsborough Castle, are the responsibility of Historic Royal Palaces.

Unlike the other nations of the United Kingdom, there is no official residence for a member of the royal family in Wales.

== Map of select residences ==
Red: Used by the King and Queen
Blue: Used by the Prince and Princess of Wales
Green: Used by other members of the royal family
Red: Used by the King and Queen
Blue: Used by the Prince and Princess of Wales
Green: Used by other members of the royal family

== Official residences ==
Residence	Location	Ownership	Residents	Notes
Buckingham Palace	London, England	The Crown	King Charles III and Queen Camilla use Buckingham Palace for official business; will not reside there post refurbishment.	
Clarence House	London, England	The Crown	Grace and favour The current London residence for the King and Queen	
Kensington Palace	London, England	The Crown	The Prince and Princess of Wales; Prince George; Princess Charlotte; Prince Louis; The Duke and Duchess of Gloucester; The Duke of Kent; Princess Eugenie and Jack Brooksbank; Prince and Princess Michael of Kent	Also in part a Historic Royal Palace, otherwise, grace and favour
St James's Palace	London, England	The Crown	The Princess Royal; The Duke and Duchess of Edinburgh; Princess Alexandra, The Honourable Lady Ogilvy; Princess Beatrice and Edoardo Mapelli Mozzi	Grace and favour
Windsor Castle	Windsor, Berkshire, England	The Crown	The King and Queen	Official country residence
Holyrood Palace	Edinburgh, Scotland	The Crown	The King and Queen	Used whenever the royal family undertake official duties in Scotland: primarily 'Royal Week' in July
Hillsborough Castle	County Down, Northern Ireland	The Crown	The King and Queen	Used whenever the royal family undertake official duties in Northern Ireland. Also, a Historic Royal Palace.

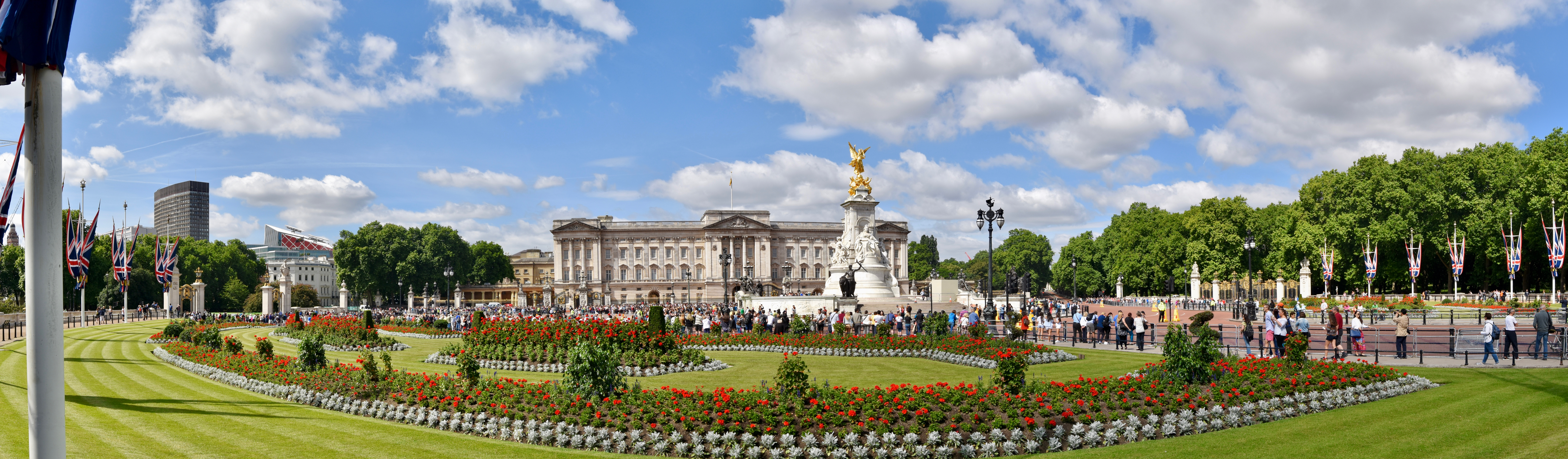
Buckingham Palace, the official residence of Charles III in London

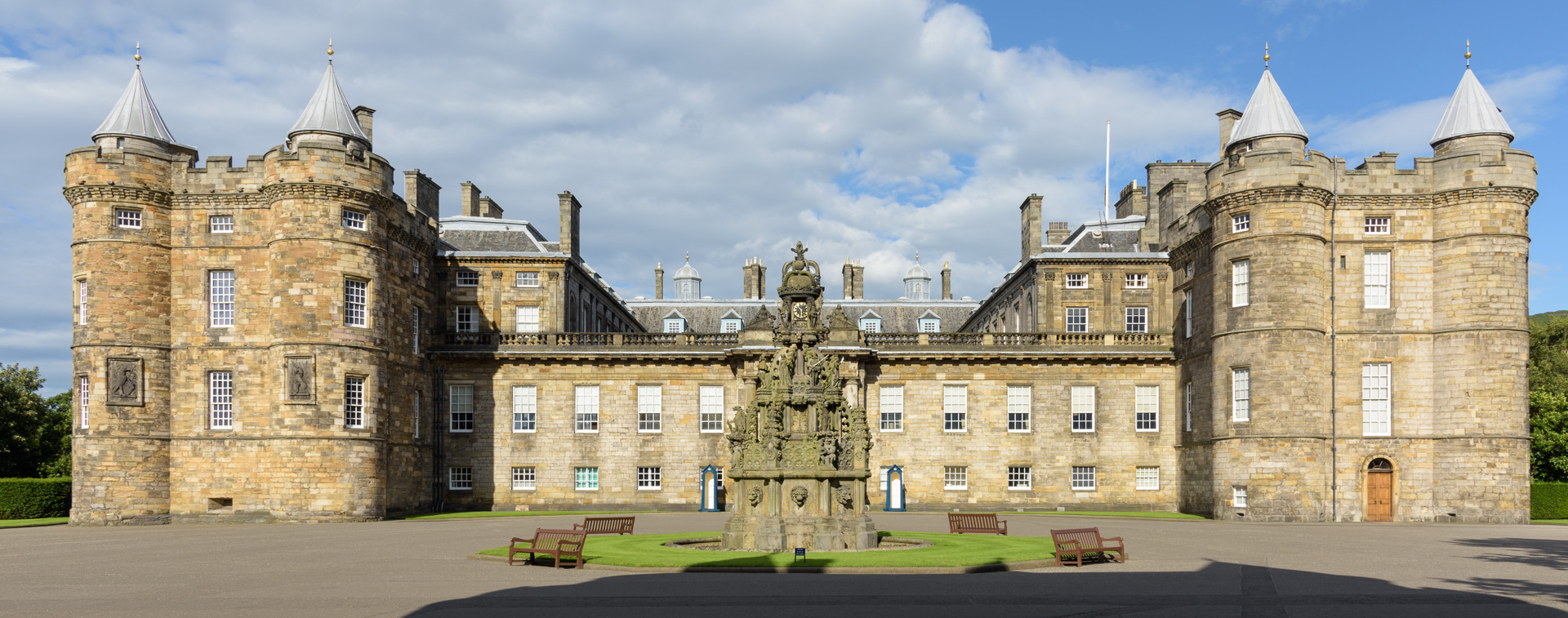
Holyrood Palace, the official residence of Charles III in Scotland

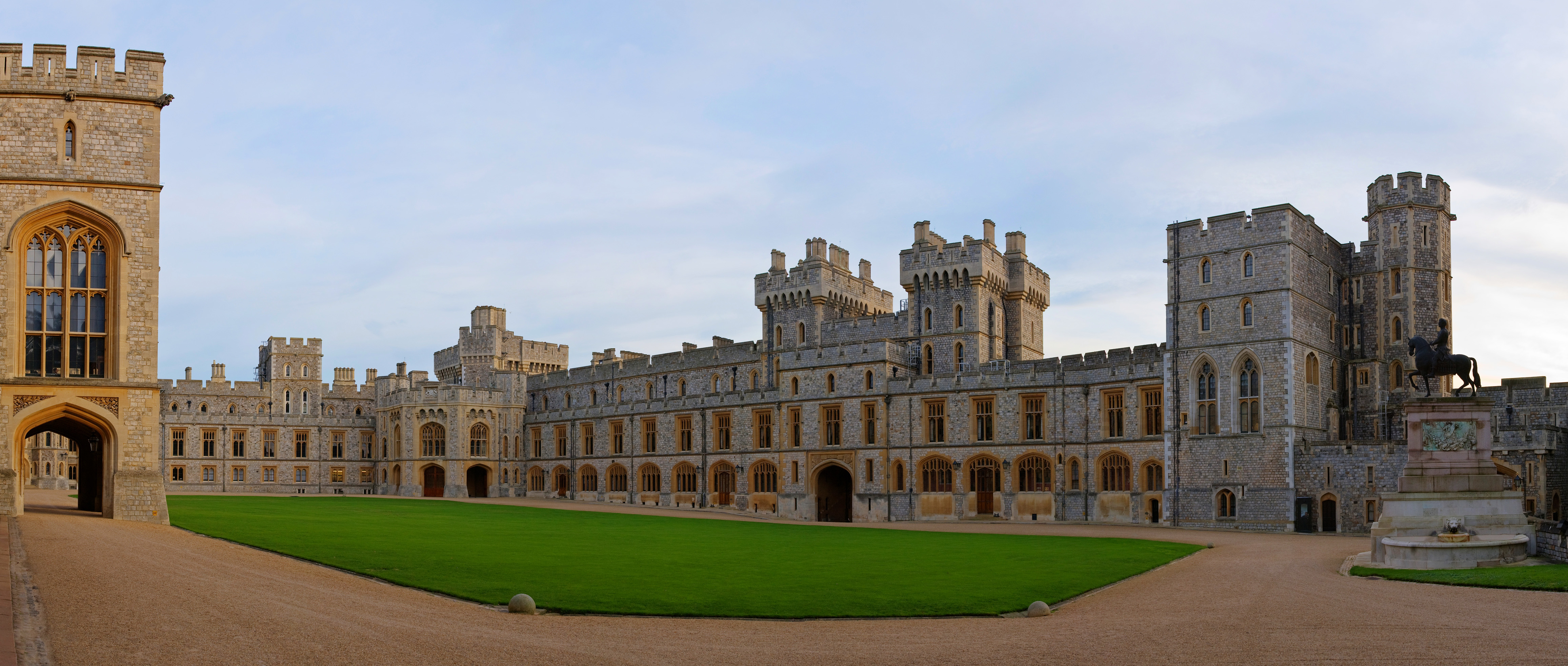
Windsor Castle, the official country residence of Charles III

== Private residences ==
=== London ===
Residence	Location	Ownership	Residents	Notes
Ivy Cottage	Kensington Palace, London	The Crown	Princess Eugenie and Jack Brooksbank	Current residence, leased from the Crown Estate
Wren House	Kensington Palace, London	The Crown	The Duke of Kent	Official London residence, also a Historic Royal Palace, grace and favour
Thatched House Lodge	Richmond, London	The Crown	Princess Alexandra, The Honourable Lady Ogilvy	Official country residence, leased from the Crown Estate in 1957

=== Windsor and nearby ===
Residence	Location	Type	Residents	Notes
Forest Lodge	Windsor Estate, Berkshire, England	The Crown	The Prince and Princess of Wales: Prince George; Princess Charlotte; Prince Louis	Leased from the Crown Estate
Bagshot Park	Bagshot, England	The Crown	The Duke and Duchess of Edinburgh	Leased from the Crown Estate

=== Balmoral ===
Residence	Location	Type	Residents	Notes
Balmoral Castle	Aberdeenshire, Scotland	Private	The King and Queen	August and September, inherited from Elizabeth II.
Birkhall	Balmoral Estate, Aberdeenshire, Scotland	Private	The King and Queen	Previously owned by Queen Elizabeth the Queen Mother; located on the estate of Balmoral Castle. Charles inherited the home when his grandmother died in 2002.
Craigowan Lodge	Balmoral Estate, Aberdeenshire, Scotland	Private	The King and Queen	Inherited from Elizabeth II.
Tam-Na-Ghar	Balmoral Estate, Aberdeenshire, Scotland	Private	The Prince and Princess of Wales: Prince George; Princess Charlotte; Prince Louis	Previously owned by Queen Elizabeth the Queen Mother; located on the estate of Balmoral Castle. William inherited the home shortly before his great-grandmother's death.

=== Elsewhere in the United Kingdom ===
Residence	Location	Type	Residents	Notes
Sandringham House	Sandringham, Norfolk, England	Private	The King and Queen	Christmas until February, inherited from Elizabeth II
Anmer Hall	Sandringham Estate, Norfolk, England	Private	The Prince and Princess of Wales: Prince George; Princess Charlotte; Prince Louis	Located on the grounds of Sandringham House. Wedding gift from Elizabeth II to Prince William and Catherine
Marsh Farm	Sandringham Estate, Norfolk, England	Private	Andrew Mountbatten-Windsor	Moved in April 2026
Highgrove House	Gloucestershire, England	Duchy of Cornwall	The King and Queen	Control of the house was transferred to William, Prince of Wales, when he inherited the Duchy of Cornwall.
Gatcombe Park	Minchinhampton, England	Private	The Princess Royal	
Ray Mill House	Wiltshire, England	Private	The Queen	Purchased in 1996 before marrying into the royal family.
Name Unknown	Cotswolds, England	Private	Princess Beatrice and Edoardo Mapelli Mozzi	Purchased in 2021

=== Outside the United Kingdom ===
Residence	Location	Type	Residents	Notes
Name Unknown	Comporta, Portugal	Private	Princess Eugenie and Jack Brooksbank	Purchased in 2022
Chateau of Riven Rock	Montecito, California, USA	Private	The Duke and Duchess of Sussex: Prince Archie; Princess Lilibet	Purchased in 2020

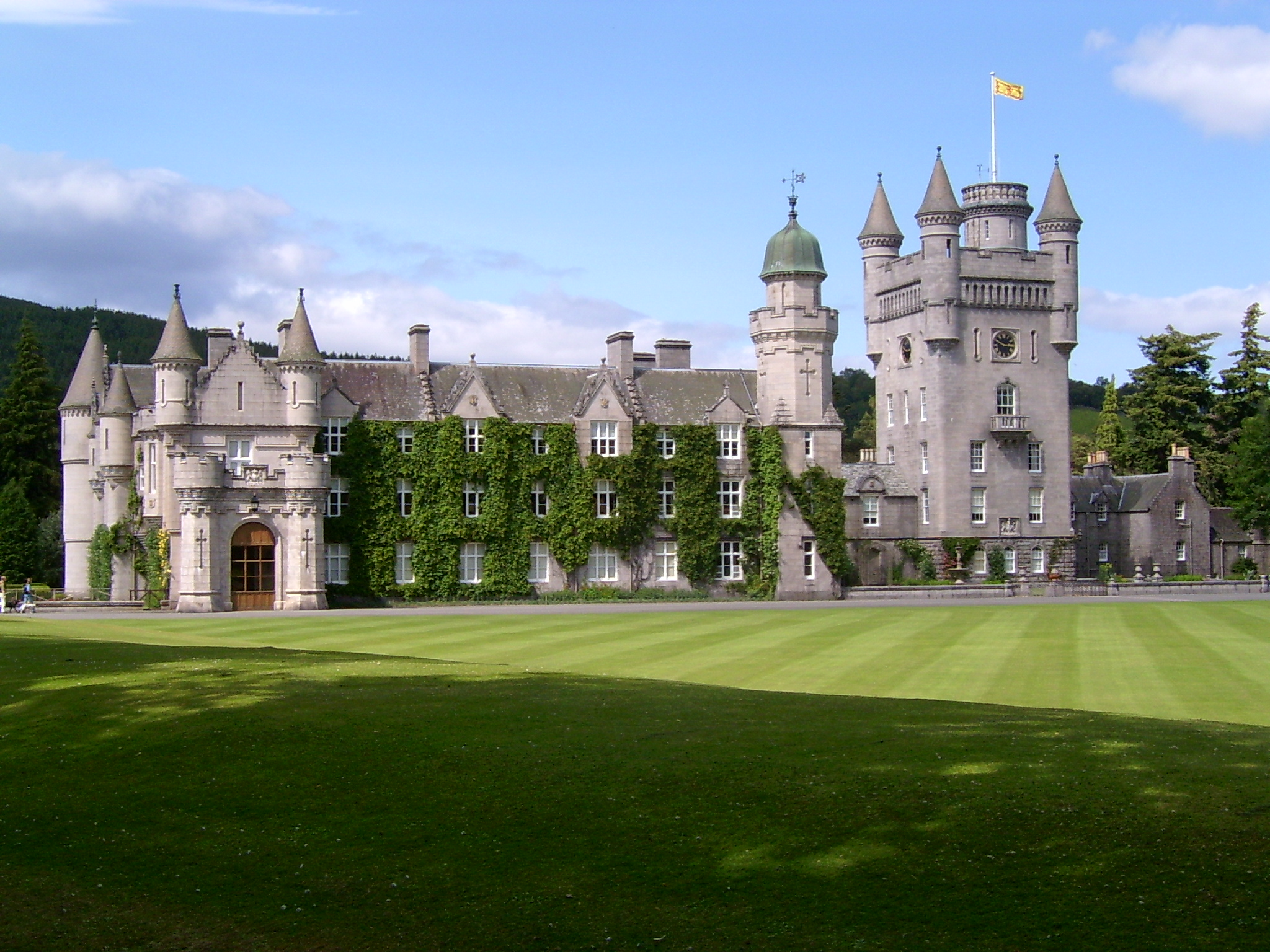
Balmoral Castle, the private residence of Charles III in Aberdeenshire

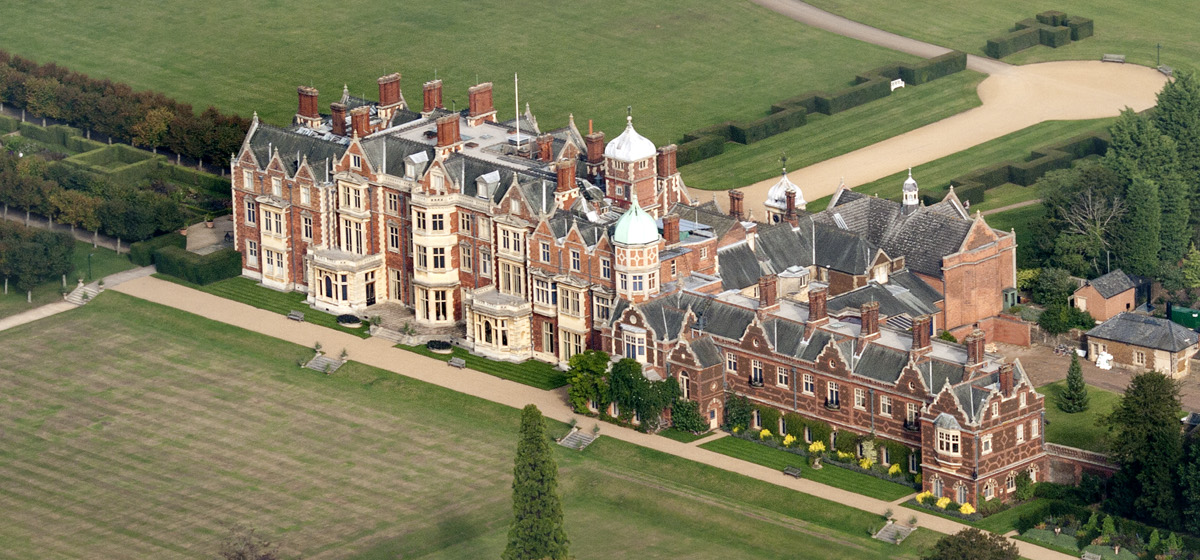
Sandringham House, the private residence of Charles III in Norfolk

== Former royal residences ==
=== London ===
Residence	Location	Royals and Dates
145 Piccadilly	Piccadilly	Prince Albert, Duke of York and Elizabeth, Duchess of York and Princess Elizabeth and Princess Margaret of York (1926–1936)
Albany House / The Albany	Piccadilly	Prince Frederick, Duke of York and Albany (1791–1802)
15 Portman Square	Marylebone	Leased by Alexander Duff, 1st Duke of Fife in the weeks prior to his marriage to Princess Louise of Wales. London residence of Princess Louise from 1889 until her death in 1931.
3 Belgrave Square	Belgravia, London	London home of Prince George, Duke of Kent and his wife Princess Marina following their marriage in 1934 until the outbreak of World War II. Birthplace of their son Prince Edward, Duke of Kent and daughter Princess Alexandra of Kent.
32 Green Street	Mayfair, London	Owned by Hugh Grosvenor, 2nd Duke of Westminster, in 1931 Queen Mary (consort of George V) suggested the house should be available as a royal residence for her daughter Mary, Princess Royal and son-in-law Henry Lascelles, 6th Earl of Harewood. The Princess and Earl lived at the house until the outbreak of World War II, and the house was sold back to the Grosvenor Estate in 1946.
36 Belgrave Square ("Ingestre House")	Belgravia, London	Rented by Queen Victoria as a London residence for her mother Victoria, Duchess of Kent for £2,000 a year. The Duchess moved into Ingestre House after vacating her quarters at Buckingham Palace following the Queen's marriage to Prince Albert of Saxe-Coburg and Gotha in February 1840. In September of the same year the Queen's aunt Princess Augusta Sophia died, and the Duchess of Kent was given use of Clarence House, which had been the late Princess's London residence.
41 Belgrave Square	Belgravia, London	41 Belgrave Square was the London residence of Prince Arthur of Connaught and his wife Princess Alexandra, 2nd Duchess of Fife from c. 1920 until Prince Arthur's death in 1938. The house was sold in 1939.
54 Mount Street	Mayfair, London	London residence of Prince Arthur of Connaught and Princess Alexandra, 2nd Duchess of Fife following their marriage in 1913 until September 1916.
64 Avenue Road	St John's Wood, London	Purchased by Princess Alexandra, 2nd Duchess of Fife, in November 1938, following the death of her husband Prince Arthur of Connaught in September of that year. The house served as the Duchess of Fife's London home until her death in 1959.
77 & 78 Pall Mall (previously known as "Schomberg House")	Pall Mall, London	Granted to the Crown Estate by the Office of Works in exchange for Bushy House, Middlesex in 1900. Converted into a single residence in 1901, it was given to Princess Helena as a grace-and-favour residence from August 1902 until her death in 1923, after which her daughters Princess Helena Victoria and Princess Marie Louise continued to live at the house until 1947. Known during the early 20th century as Schomberg House, causing some confusion with a nearby property which also bears this name at 80 - 82 Pall Mall.
8 South Audley Street ("Cambridge House" until 1830)	South Audley Street, Mayfair, London	Caroline of Brunswick (c. 1820 – 1821), Prince Adolphus, Duke of Cambridge (c. 1819 – 1830), Prince Frederick, Duke of York and Albany (1826)
Bentley Priory	Borough of Harrow	Queen Adelaide (leased 1846/8–1849)
Bridewell Palace	City of London	Henry VIII; Edward VI (1515–1523, owned until 1556)
Bushy House	Teddington	William IV; the FitzClarences, Dorothea Jordan, Adelaide of Saxe-Meiningen (1797–1849; still owned)
Cambridge House	Piccadilly	Official London residence of Prince Adolphus, Duke of Cambridge (1829–1850)
Cambridge Cottage	Kew	
Carlton House	Westminster	George IV (1783–1827; demolished and Carlton House Terrace constructed on the site, owned by the Crown Estate)
Castle Hill Lodge	Ealing	Used by Maria Anne Fitzherbert from October 1795 and George, Prince of Wales; then, bought by Prince Edward, Duke of Kent (father of Queen Victoria), who spent £100,000 enhancing the house (£6.47 million in 2025). His aide-de-camp, General Sir Frederick Augustus Wetherall, bought the house to rescue the Duchess from creditors following the Duke of Kent's death. The house was demolished in 1845 by General Sir George Augustus Wetherall.
Chelsea Manor	Chelsea	Princess Elizabeth; Anne of Cleves (1536–1547, c. 1547–1557)
Chesterfield House	Westminster	London home of Princess Mary (1923–1932) – purchased by Henry Lascelles, 6th Earl of Harewood in 1919, vacated by the couple in late 1931 and sold in 1934.
Crosby Hall	Chelsea	Richard, Duke of Gloucester (mid–late 15th century)
Cumberland House	Pall Mall	Prince Edward, Duke of York and Albany (c. 1761 – 1767, during which time the building was known as "York House"), and Prince Henry, Duke of Cumberland
Dolphin Square	Embankment	Anne, Princess Royal rented a flat here
Dover House	Whitehall	Prince Frederick, Duke of York (1788–1792)
East Sheen Lodge	Richmond upon-Thames	Princess Louise, Princess Royal (1889–1908)
Gloucester House, Mayfair	Piccadilly	Prince William, Duke of Gloucester died here in 1805, as did his daughter-in-law Princess Mary, the last surviving child of George III, on 30 April 1857
Gunnersbury Park	Borough of Hounslow	Summer retreat of Princess Amelia (1760–1786)
Hampton Court Palace	Richmond-upon-Thames	The Crown, since Henry VIII (1525), now managed by Historic Royal Palace agency
Hanworth Manor	Borough of Hounslow	Henry VII; Henry VIII; Elizabeth I; also Anne Boleyn and Katherine Parr
Kensington Palace	Royal Borough of Kensington and Chelsea, London	Built for William III and Mary II during the late 17th century. Occupied by subsequent monarchs Anne, George I, and George II. Divided into various residences and apartments from the reign of George III. Apartment 1: Encompasses parts of the Palace currently known as Apartment 1 and Apartment 1A. Occupants include Prince Augustus Frederick, Duke of Sussex from 1805 to 1843, and then by his morganatic widow Cecilia Underwood, Duchess of Inverness until 1873. Occupied by Princess Louise, Duchess of Argyll from c. 1874 to 1939. Separated from Apartment 1A in the mid-1950s, occupants of the reduced Apartment 1 have included Princess Marina, Duchess of Kent from c. 1955 until her death in 1968. Home of Prince Henry, Duke of Gloucester from 1969 until his death in 1974, and then by his widow Princess Alice, Duchess of Gloucester until her death in 2004. Subsequently used by their son Prince Richard, Duke of Gloucester and his family until 2019. Apartment 1A: Divided from Apartment 1 during the mid-1950s. Occupants include Princess Margaret, Countess of Snowdon from 1963 until her death in 2002. Used as the official London residence of William, Prince of Wales, Catherine, Princess of Wales and their children since 2012. Apartment 2: Encompasses part of the State Rooms and floors below, created as an apartment for Prince Edward, Duke of Kent and Strathearn in 1798, and birthplace of his only child Queen Victoria in 1819. Follow his death in 1820 Apartment 2 was occupied by his widow Victoria, Duchess of Kent until her daughter's accession in 1837. Granted to the Queen's cousin Princess Mary Adelaide, Duchess of Teck in 1867, who lived there with her family (including her daughter, future queen consort Mary of Teck) until 1883. London residence of Princess Beatrice of the United Kingdom from c. 1896 until her death in 1944. Apartment 4: Granted to Helen, Dowager Duchess of Albany in 1917. Following her death in 1922, granted to her daughter Princess Alice, Countess of Athlone until her own death in 1981. Apartments 6 & 7: Apartment 7 was granted to Queen Victoria's granddaughter Victoria, Marchioness of Milford Haven in 1922. Apartment 6 was merged with this Apartment in 1925. Lived in by her grandson Prince Philip of Greece and Denmark when in London prior to his marriage to The Princess Elizabeth in 1947. Following Lady Milford Haven's death in 1950, Apartment 7 was granted to Queen Mary's niece Mary, Duchess of Beaufort and her husband, the-then Master of the Horse Henry Somerset, 10th Duke of Beaufort until c. 1979. Apartment 8: Granted to Lady Patricia Ramsay (formerly Princess Patricia of Connaught) in 1939, vacated after bombing damage in 1940. Combined with Apartment 9 and used as the official London residence of Charles, Prince of Wales and Diana, Princess of Wales from 1981, occupied by Diana after their separation in 1992 until her death in 1997. Apartment 10: Granted to Queen Victoria's grandson Alexander Mountbatten, 1st Marquess of Carisbrooke from 1956 until his death in 1960. Occupied by Princess Margaret, Countess of Snowdon and her husband Antony Armstrong-Jones, Earl of Snowdon following their marriage in 1960 whilst renovations were underway at the larger Apartment 1A. Vacated by the Snowdons in 1963, used as the London residence of Prince Michael of Kent since 1978.
Kennington Palace	Kennington	Built by Edward the Black Prince around 1350. Demolished c.1531 to provide materials for the Palace of Whitehall.
Kew Palace	Kew	Frederick, Prince of Wales; George III; The Crown since mid-18th century; managed by Historic Royal Palaces
Lancaster House	Westminster	
Leicester House	Westminster	Frederick, Prince of Wales (c. 1730–1751)
Tower of London	City of London	Now managed by Historic Royal Palaces
Marlborough House	Westminster	Princess Mary, Duchess of Gloucester and Edinburgh; Queen Adelaide (1837–1849); Albert Edward, Prince of Wales and Alexandra, Princess of Wales (1863–1901); George, Prince of Wales and Mary, Princess of Wales (1901–1910). Occupied by Queen Mary 1945–1953.
Nonsuch Palace		Built by Henry VIII, later dismantled and sold-off by Barbara Palmer, 1st Duchess of Cleveland
Norfolk House		Frederick, Prince of Wales
Nottingham Cottage	grounds of Kensington Palace	
Palace of Placentia		The Palace at Greenwich, acquired by Margaret of Anjou (consort to Henry VI). Demolished and rebuilt for Charles II in 1664 (King Charles Wing).Given by Queen Mary to Trustees for the Royal Hospital for Seamen (now referred to as the Old Royal Naval College) who have leased it to Trinity Laban University.
Queen's House	Greenwich	Built in the Gardens of the Palace of Greenwich for Anne of Denmark, consort to James I a small part of a proposed rebuilding of Greenwich (Placentia) Palace. Given by Queen Mary to Trustees for the Royal Hospital for Seamen (now referred to as the Old Royal Naval College). Part of the National Maritime Museum.
Richmond Palace		Also known as Palace of Sheen, Royal residence 1327 to 1649. A few above ground remains survive in Palace Yard, Richmond
Savile House	Leicester Square	
Savoy Palace		
Somerset House		Elizabeth I; Queen Henrietta Maria
Sussex House	Upper Mall, Hammersmith	Prince Augustus, Duke of Sussex
Palace of Westminster		Anglo-Saxon era – 1530
Palace of Whitehall		1530–1698
White Lodge	Richmond	Princess Amelia of Great Britain; George III and Queen Charlotte; Princess Mary, Duchess of Gloucester and Edinburgh; Albert Edward, Prince of Wales; Princess Mary Adelaide of Cambridge and family; Prince Albert, Duke of York and Elizabeth Bowes-Lyon (c. 1740–1923)
York House, St James's Palace		Caroline of Brunswick in 1795, prior to her marriage to the Prince of Wales. London residence of Ernest Augustus, Duke of Cumberland (later King Ernest Augustus I of Hanover) from c. 1800 until his death in 1851. Granted to the widowed Augusta, Duchess of Cambridge in 1852 until her death in 1889. Official London residence of Prince George, Duke of York (later George V) and Mary of Teck from 1893 until 1902. Granted to Edward, Prince of Wales (later Edward VIII) in 1919. After the abdication of King Edward VIII, York House became the London residence of Prince Henry, Duke of Gloucester and his family from c. 1937 until 1969. Later occupants include Prince Edward, Duke of Kent and Charles, Prince of Wales.

=== England ===
Residence	Location	Royals and Dates
Adelaide Cottage	Windsor, Berkshire	Queen Adelaide; William, Prince of Wales and Catherine, Princess of Wales (2022–2025)
Allerton Castle	North Yorkshire	Prince Frederick, Duke of York and Albany (1786–1789)
Apethorpe Palace	Apthorp Park, in Apethorpe, Northamptonshire	Henry VIII to Charles I
Audley End House	Saffron Walden, Essex	Charles II (1668–1701)
Barnwell Manor	Northamptonshire	Princes Henry and Richard, Dukes of Gloucester (1938–1995; sold 2024)
Palace of Beaulieu	Chelmsford, Essex	Henry VIII; Edward VI; Mary I; Elizabeth I (1517–1622)
Beaumont Palace	Oxford	Henry I to Edward II (1130–1318)
Cumberland Lodge	Windsor Great Park	Prince William, Duke of Cumberland; Prince Henry, Duke of Cumberland and Strathearn and Anne, Duchess of Cumberland and Strathearn; Prince Augustus Frederick, Duke of Sussex; Princess Helena of the United Kingdom and Prince Christian of Schleswig-Holstein (1746–1803; 1830–1843; 1866–1923)
Fort Belvedere	Windsor Great Park	Prince William, Duke of Cumberland; Prince Arthur, Duke of Connaught; Edward VIII, Gerald and Angela Lascelles (1953–1976)
Berkhamsted Castle	Berkhamsted, Hertfordshire	William the Conqueror (1066); Henry I (1123); Edward, the Black Prince (1337); a number of queens consort (1191–1400); last occupied 1469–1496 by Cecily Neville, Duchess of York
Brantridge Park	Balcombe, West Sussex	Princess Alice, Countess of Athlone; Princess Beatrice of the United Kingdom (1919–1941)
Brill Palace	Brill, Buckinghamshire	Edward the Confessor; Harold Godwinson; William the Conqueror; William II; Henry I; Stephen; Henry II; John; Henry III; Edward I; Edward II; Edward III (c. 1042–1337; given to Sir John de Moleyns)
Fife House	Brighton	1st Duke of Fife; Louise, Princess Royal and Duchess of Fife (1896–1924)
Carisbrooke Castle	Newport, Isle of Wight	Charles I; Princess Elizabeth; Henry Stuart, Duke of Gloucester and Princess Henrietta; Princess Beatrice of the United Kingdom (1647 – c. 1652, 1896–1944; now managed by English Heritage)
Castlewood House	Egham, Surrey	Leased by the then Prince Andrew, Duke of York and Sarah, Duchess of York (1987–1990)
Cheylesmore Manor	Coventry, Warwickshire	Brought into the Royal family by Queen Isabella. Used as a residence and hunting lodge by many monarchs, including Edward, the Black Prince, and Henry VI.
Chideock Manor	Dorset	Rented by the then Prince Andrew, Duke of York and Sarah, Duchess of York (1986–1987)
Claremont	Esher, Surrey	Princess Charlotte Augusta of Wales and Prince Leopold of Saxe-Coburg-Saalfeld; Prince Leopold, Duke of Albany and Princess Helena, Duchess of Albany (1816–1831; owned until 1865, 1882–1922)
Clarendon Palace	Salisbury, Wiltshire	Used for hunting trips during the Middle Ages. Now ruined.
Cliveden	Buckinghamshire	Frederick, Prince of Wales
Coombe Abbey	Warwickshire	Owned 16th century–?; Elizabeth of Bohemia (early 17th century)
Coppins	Buckinghamshire	Princess Victoria; Princes George and Edward, Dukes of Kent (1925–1973)
Crocker End House	Oxfordshire	Prince Edward, Duke of Kent (1990–?)
Eastwell Park	Kent	Prince Alfred, Duke of Edinburgh and Maria, Duchess of Edinburgh (rented 1874–1893)
Eltham Palace	Kent	The Crown (Edward II to Henry VIII; now managed by English Heritage)
Frogmore Cottage	Windsor	Prince Harry, Duke of Sussex and Meghan, Duchess of Sussex, vacant as of June 2023
Frogmore House	Windsor	Queen Charlotte and her then-unmarried daughters – Charlotte, Princess Royal, Princesses Princess Augusta, Elizabeth, Mary, Sophia, Amelia; Princess Augusta; Princess Victoria, Duchess of Kent (leased 1792–?)
Gloucester House	Weymouth	Summer residence of Prince William Henry, Duke of Gloucester (later 18th century)
Goldsborough Hall	North Yorkshire	Yorkshire home of Princess Mary (1923–1930) – owned by the Harewood estate
Harewood House	West Yorkshire	Yorkshire home of Princess Mary (1930–1965) – owned by the Harewood estate
Hatfield House	Hertfordshire	The Crown (residents included Prince Edward and Princess Elizabeth; 16th century – 1607)
Havering Palace	Havering, Essex	c. 1050 – c. 1640 (see also: Pirgo Palace in Havering)
Kent House	Isle of Wight	Princess Louise, Duchess of Argyll (from 1901)
King James' Palace	Royston, Hertfordshire	Built by James I as a hunting lodge, it was also used by his son Charles I (1607–1649)
Kingsbourne House	Wentworth, Surrey	Leased by Sarah, Duchess of York (1994–1997)
Kings Langley Palace	Hertfordshire	Used by the Plantagenet to Tudor Kings (1276–1558)
Leeds Castle	Kent	Edward I and Queen Eleanor of Castile (1278); Edward II and Isabella of France (1321); Henry VIII and Catherine of Aragon (1519)
Nether Lypiatt Manor	Stroud, Gloucestershire	Former country home of Prince and Princess Michael of Kent
Oak Grove House	Sandhurst	
Oatlands Palace	Weybridge, Surrey	Henry VIII; Edward VI; Mary I; Elizabeth I (and the Stuart line)
Oatlands Park	Weybridge, Surrey	
Osborne Cottage	Isle of Wight	Princess Beatrice of the United Kingdom (1901–1912)
Osborne House	Isle of Wight	Queen Victoria and Prince Albert (1846–1901). Queen Victoria died there on 22 January 1901. Bequeathed to her successor Edward VII, who gave it to the nation later that year.
Ribsden Holt	Windlesham, Surrey	Princess Louise, Duchess of Argyll; Princess Patricia of Connaught
Romenda Lodge	Wentworth Estate, Surrey	Detached house leased by the Duchess of York 1992–1994
Royal Lodge	Windsor	Temporary residence for George, Prince of Wales (1812); George VI (1930–1952) and Queen Elizabeth the Queen Mother (1930–2002); Andrew Mountbatten-Windsor and family (2004–2026)
The Royal Pavilion, Brighton	Brighton, East Sussex	George IV; William IV; Victoria (1786–1838)
Sunninghill Park	Ascot, Windsor	The then Prince Andrew, Duke of York and family (c. 1990–2004)
Tamarisk House	Isles of Scilly	
Theobalds Palace	Hertfordshire	The Crown. James I exchanged it by Act of Parliament with Lord Burleigh; Charles I also lived there; granted in 1 & 2 William and Mary to William, Duke of Portland
Tutbury Castle	Staffordshire	Property of the Duchy of Lancaster since 1269. Numerous kings and queens lived there periodically including Richard III, Henry VIII, Mary, Queen of Scots, James VI and I and Charles I. After the English Civil War the castle was slighted and ruined, however the King's Lodgings remain intact.
Walmer Castle	Walmer, Kent	
Westfield	Bonchurch, Isle of Wight	Built as hunting lodge for Queen Adelaide in 1825, now converted into apartments, most of the estate sold
The King's House	Winchester	Proposed and partly completed royal residence for Charles II designed by Sir Christopher Wren.
Windlesham Moor	Surrey	The Princess Elizabeth, Duchess of Edinburgh, Philip, Duke of Edinburgh (1947–4 July 1949)
Witley Court	Worcestershire	
Wood Farm	Sandringham Estate	From his retirement in 2017 until his death in 2021, the house was home to Prince Philip, Duke of Edinburgh. Was temporary residence of Andrew Mountbatten-Windsor in 2026.
Woodstock Palace	Oxfordshire	
York Cottage	In the grounds of Sandringham House, Norfolk	Occupied by George V and his wife Queen Mary as Duke and Duchess of York. They retained use of the small cottage after their accession in 1910. It was later given to George V's son, Prince Albert, Duke of York and Elizabeth Bowes-Lyon.

=== Scotland ===
Residence	Location	Royals and Dates
Abergeldie Castle	Abergeldie, Aberdeenshire	Queen Victoria to Elizabeth II (1848–1970)
Cadzow Castle	South Lanarkshire, Scotland	Scottish crown (David I, Alexander II, Alexander III, John, Robert I); Mary, Queen of Scots (mid-early 12th century to early 14th century, early May 1568)
Doune Castle	Stirlingshire	Seat of the Duke of Albany (1380–1603)
Dunfermline Palace	Dunfermline, Fife	Seat of the Scottish monarchs (1500–1650)
Edinburgh Castle	Edinburgh	A residence of Scottish monarchs from the 11th to the 17th centuries, last used by Charles I in 1633 (now managed by Historic Scotland)
Falkland Palace	Falkland, Fife	Various, including Robert Stewart, Duke of Albany; David Stewart, Duke of Rothesay (The Scottish Crown 14th century –; now National Trust for Scotland)
Glamis Castle	Glamis, Angus	Residence of Scottish monarchs up to Robert II, who gave the estate to his son-in-law Sir John Lyon, Thane of Glamis, whence it became the seat of the Bowes-Lyon family. Much later, three rooms were let to George VI and Queen Elizabeth the Queen Mother, the latter of whom was a Bowes-Lyon
The Castle of Mey	near John o' Groats	Queen Elizabeth the Queen Mother (1952–2002)
Mar Lodge	Braemar	Alexander Duff, 1st Duke of Fife and Princess Louise, Princess Royal to Alexander Ramsay (1895–2000)
Linlithgow Palace	West Lothian	
Stirling Castle	Stirling	Scottish monarchs

=== Wales ===
Residence	Location	Royals and Dates
Bodorgan Hall	Bodorgan, Anglesey, Wales	Prince William and Catherine lived in a four-bedroom cottage on the Bodorgan Hall estate from 2010 to 2013. Their son Prince George (b. July 2013) spent his first months on the estate.
Caernarfon Castle	Caernarfon, Wales	Edward I (until 1283; still owned)
Castell y Bere	Llanfihangel-y-Pennant, Wales	Llywelyn the Great, Prince of Wales (until 1284) then Edward I
Criccieth Castle	Criccieth, Wales	Llywelyn the Great, Prince of Wales (until 1284) then Edward I
Dolbadarn Castle	Llanberis, Wales	Llywelyn the Great, Prince of Wales (and Princes of Wales until 1284) then Edward I
Dolwyddelan Castle	Dolwyddelan, Wales	Llywelyn the Great, Prince of Wales (until 1284) then Edward I
Llwynywermod	Myddfai, Wales	Former country residence of Charles, Prince of Wales

=== Outside the United Kingdom ===
Residence	Location	Royals and Dates
Villa Windsor	Paris, France	The Duke and Duchess of Windsor (1937–1986)
Dublin Castle	Dublin, Republic of Ireland	Seat of Lords and Kings of Ireland (1171–1922)
E.P. Ranch	Pekisko, Alberta, Canada	Edward VIII (1919–1962)
Les Jolies Eaux	Mustique, St Vincent	Gift to Princess Margaret. Sold by her son Viscount Linley in 2000.
Les Bruyeres	Cap Ferrat, France	Owned by Prince Arthur, Duke of Connaught and Strathearn (1921–1942)
Sagana Lodge	Kenya	
Verdala Palace	Siġġiewi, Malta	
San Anton Palace	Attard, Malta	
Grandmaster's Palace	Valletta, Malta	
Villa Guardamangia	Pietà, Malta	

== See also ==
- Pickering Castle
