= Sir Henry Steuart =

Sir Henry Seton Steuart FRSE LLD (né Steuart; 20 October 1759 – 11 March 1836) was a Scottish landowner, agricultural improver, soldier and classical scholar.

== Biography ==
He was born Henry Steuart at Allanton House in Lanarkshire in 1759, the son of Margaret Steuart-Barclay of Collairnie and her husband, James Steuart, 10th Laird of Allanton. They were descended from Sir John Stewart of Bonkyll. He was educated at the High School in Edinburgh then studied in Hamburg in Germany (1775).

In 1778 he was commissioned into the 13th Light Dragoons. In 1781 he moved to the 10th Light Dragoons. He resigned his commission in 1787.

In 1799 he was elected a Fellow of the Royal Society of Edinburgh. His proposers were Alexander Fraser Tytler, Andrew Dalzell and Thomas Charles Hope. In 1806 the University of Edinburgh awarded him an honorary doctorate (LLD).

In 1814 he was created Baronet of Allanton. Sir Walter Scott visited him at Allanton to see his land improvements in January 1829.

He died at Allanton in 1836 and was buried nearby in Cambusnethan Churchyard.

== Family ==
In 1787 he married Lillian Seton, daughter of Hugh Seton of Touch House in Stirlingshire (sometimes known as Touch-Seton). He was thereafter known as Henry Seton Steuart. He rebuilt Allanton House in the year of his marriage.

They had one daughter, Elizabeth Margaret Steuart (1790-1866). She married Reginald Ranald Macdonald, from 1836 known as Sir Reginald Ranald Seton-Steuart. Sir Reginald was created 2nd Baronet through the marriage.

== Publications ==
- The Planter's Guide (1828)
- A History of the Rebellion of 1745 (unfinished - manuscript passed to Robert Chambers)

== Artistic recognition ==
He was portrayed by Edward Burton.

Baronetage of the United Kingdom
| New creation | Baronet (of Allanton); 1815–1836 | Succeeded by Reginald Seton-Steuart |
