= Crocker End House =

Country house in Nettlebed, Oxfordshire, England

Coordinates: 51.576976°N 0.979650°W

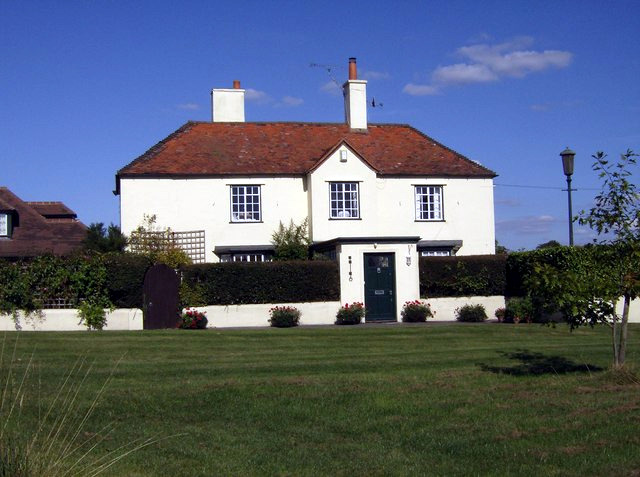
Crocker End House

Crocker End House in Nettlebed in Henley-on-Thames, Oxfordshire, England is a spacious Victorian home built to replace Nettlebed's prosperous rectory in about 1870. It was bought by the Duke and Duchess of Kent in December 1989.

== Owner-occupiers ==
The house was bought by the grandson of King George V and his wife, Prince Edward, Duke of Kent and Katharine, Duchess of Kent in December 1989 who occupied from February of the following year, having left Anmer Hall, their Norfolk home of eighteen years. The Duke and Duchess, with their family, used the house as their country retreat and in the early 21st century moved and sold the estate.

Former owner-occupiers are Lord Campbell of Eskan and the Earl of Arran.

== Grounds and woodland ==
Crocker End House sits in a plot of 4 acres (1.6 ha): the east half containing the house is garden which has a tennis court; the west half is a woodland known as Crocker End Green, part of the larger Chilterns woodlands. Its grounds compare to the quite large mainly rural civil parish of Nettlebed which measures 6.13 square kilometres (1,510 acres). Of relevance to the former rectory on the site and in Anglicanism, the ecclesiastical parish is near-identical in area.
