= Anmer =

Village in Norfolk, England

Coordinates: 52.834°N 0.584°E

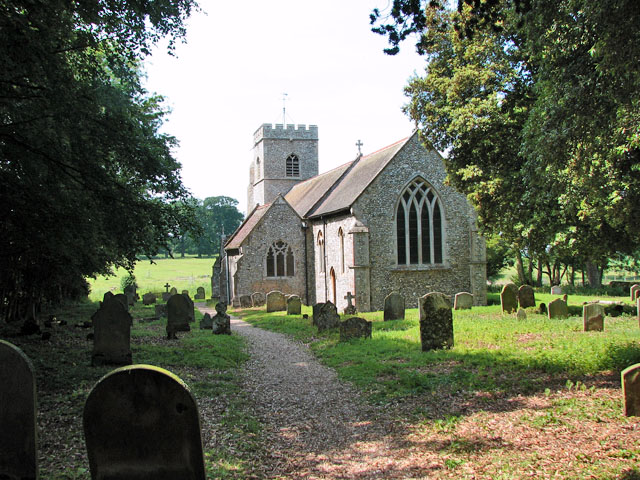
- St Mary's Church, Anmer (June 2010)

- Location within Norfolk
- Area: 5.86 km^{2} (2.26 sq mi)
- OS grid reference: TF741295
- District: King's Lynn and West Norfolk
- Shire county: Norfolk
- Region: East
- Country: England
- Sovereign state: United Kingdom
- Post town: KING'S LYNN
- Postcode district: PE31
- Dialling code: 01485

Anmer is a small village and civil parish in the English county of Norfolk. It is around 12 miles (19 km) north-east of the town of King's Lynn and 35 miles (56 km) north-west of the city of Norwich. The parish is in the district of King's Lynn and West Norfolk and at the 2001 census had a population of 63 in 29 households.

The place-name 'Anmer' is recorded in the Domesday Book of 1086, where it appears as Anemere. This name derives from the Old English aened-mere, meaning 'duck mere or lake'. The parish contains evidence of settlement from the Bronze Age onwards, with a number of Bronze Age barrows to the east of the village.

Anmer Hall, the former residence of the Duke and Duchess of Kent, dates from the 18th century and stands at the centre of a landscape park laid out in 1793. This led to the clearance of the original medieval settlement and its relocation to the north-west of the hall, creating the modern village. This involved the closure of all roads across the park. A number of earthworks, including a two-metre-deep hollow way, are preserved at the site of the medieval village.

The hall is located west of the village and is linked to the nearby Sandringham estate by a long straight road known as "The Avenue". In 2014 it was renovated as the new country home of the Prince and Princess of Wales (then Duke and Duchess of Cambridge), given to the couple as a wedding gift by Elizabeth II.

The parish church, which is dedicated to St Mary, is on the Anmer Hall estate. A Grade II* listed building, it was restored in the 19th century.
