= Touch House =

- Location of Touch House in Stirling council area
- 56.1111°N 4.0062°W
- Location: Near Stirling, Scotland

Listed Building – Category A
- Designated: 5 September 1973
- Reference no.: LB15295

Inventory of Gardens and Designed Landscapes in Scotland
- Official name: Touch
- Designated: 1 July 1987
- Reference no.: GDL00377

Touch House is a country house located 4 kilometres (2.5 mi) west of Stirling in central Scotland. It stands at the foot of the Touch Hills, on the south side of the River Forth. The house incorporates a 16th-century tower house, but its present form dates to the middle of the 18th century when the south facade was added, described by Historic Environment Scotland as "Probably the finest Georgian elevation in the County of Stirling."

The house is a category A listed building, and the grounds are included in the Inventory of Gardens and Designed Landscapes in Scotland, the national listing of significant gardens.

== History ==
The name derives from the Gaelic tulach, meaning hillock, and is first recorded in 1329 in the form Tulch. The Touch estate was the property of the Frasers; a tower house may have existed from the 14th century. Touch was acquired by Alexander Seton, kinsman of the powerful Seton family, in the middle of the 15th century, and in 1480 his son Alexander is recorded as 1st laird of Touch. Elizabeth Seton inherited Touch in 1742, and in 1745 she hosted Bonnie Prince Charlie at the house, a few days prior to the battle of Prestonpans (21 September). Elizabeth married Hugh Smith, who took the name Seton, and the couple set about extending their property. The architect may have been John Steinson, a figure who is otherwise unknown. The names of William Adam (1689–1748) and his son John Adam (1721–1792) have been linked to the design.

Debts were incurred during the building of the house, and Hugh Seton continued to borrow money to fund agricultural improvements, including drainage works on the carse (floodplain) of the Forth. Hugh was eventually imprisoned as a debtor in Dover Castle, leaving the country on his release. His son Archibald Seton (1758–1818) joined the East India Company in 1779, and subsequently became a member of the Supreme Council at Fort William, Calcutta, and Lieutenant-Governor of Prince of Wales Island (Penang). Touch was managed in his absence by his brother-in-law, Sir Henry Seton-Steuart of Allanton. Sir Henry is responsible for the present layout of the parkland around the house, having commissioned Thomas White to prepare designs. A million trees are said to have been planted on the estate.

Touch was inherited by the Seton-Steuart branch of the family in 1866, and was subsequently let, the owners living at Allanton. In 1928 the estate was sold by Sir Douglas Seton-Steuart, 5th Baronet, to Mr C. A. Buchanan. Sir Robert Lorimer was commissioned to restore the interiors. Touch became a convalescent home during the Second World War, but was subsequently reoccupied by the Buchanans.

The south facade is topped by a pediment, carved with the arms of the Setons of Touch. The rear parts of the building date to the 16th and 17th centuries, including the tower house which stands on the eastern side. The 18th-century stable block has since been converted and leased as offices.
