= Watkin Lewis Griffies-Williams =

British army officer (1800–1877)

Watkin Lewis Griffies Williams, 3rd Baronet
- Born: 1800; Llwynywormwood, Carmarthenshire, Wales
- Died: 23 May 1877 (aged 76–77); Notting Hill
- Military career
- Allegiance: United Kingdom / British Empire; East India Company
- Branch: (British Raj) Madras Army
- Rank: General (United Kingdom)
- Unit: 63rd Palamcottah Light Infantry
- Conflicts: First Anglo-Burmese War

General Sir Watkin Lewis Griffies Williams, 3rd Baronet (1800 – 23 May 1877) was the 3rd and last Baronet of his line, the Griffies-Williams Baronetcy, and an officer in the British Indian Army. It was noted by a superior that he had a "perfect knowledge" of Burmese.

== Early life ==
Watkin Lewis Griffies Williams was born in 1800 at the family estate Llwynywormwood, Carmarthenshire in Wales.

== Military service ==
During his service under the East India Company, he was mentioned in despatches for his conduct during the First Anglo-Burmese War by Lieutenant Colonel Pepper: "and from Lieutenant Williams, commanding 3rd Regiment P.L.I. not only for his anxiety and zeal, but from the able assistance I have derived from his perfect knowledge of the Burmese language.". He was retrospectively awarded the Army of India Medal with Ava clasp in recognition of his service during the campaign.

Becoming Colonel of the 3rd Palamcottah Light Infantry in August 1854, he was promoted to Brevet Major-General of the Madras Infantry on 28 November 1854, with this rank being confirmed as full Major-General in 1864. He was then further promoted to Lieutenant-General on 17 September 1866 and again to General on 25 July 1870.

== Later life ==
Griffies-Williams died at 38 Elgin Road, Notting Hill on 23 May 1877. The Baronetcy ended with him, and his nephew Major Edmund Watkin Kent was granted probate over the estate.

Baronetage of the United Kingdom
Preceded by Erasmus Griffies-Williams	Baronet (of Llwyny Wormwood); 1870–1877	Extinct
