= Dundas baronets of Richmond (1815) =

Arms of the Dundas baronets of Richmond: "Argent, a lion rampant, holding between the paws a human heart, gules, in the centre chief point, a crescent azure, thereon a mullet, argent for difference."

The Dundas baronetcy, of Richmond in the County of Surrey, was created in the Baronetage of the United Kingdom on 22 May 1815 for the royal surgeon David Dundas. The title became extinct on the death of the 4th Baronet in 1868.

== Dundas baronets of Richmond (1815) ==
Sir David Dundas, 1st Baronet of Richmond

- Sir David Dundas, 1st Baronet (died 1826)
- Sir William Dundas, 2nd Baronet (1777–1840)
- Major-General Sir James Fullerton Dundas, 3rd Baronet (died 1848)
- Admiral Sir John Burnet Dundas, 4th Baronet, naval officer (1794–1868), a younger son of the 1st Baronet.. He died without male issue.

== Notes ==
Baronetage of the United Kingdom
Preceded by Domvile baronets	Dundas baronets of Richmond; 22 May 1815	Succeeded by Griffies-Williams baronets
