= Griffies-Williams baronets =

Extinct baronetcy in the Baronetage of the United Kingdom

Escutcheon of the Griffies-Williams baronets of Llwyny Wormwood

The Griffies-Williams Baronetcy, of Llwyny Wormwood in the County of Carmarthen, was a title in the Baronetage of the United Kingdom. It was created on 22 May 1815 for George Griffies-Williams. Born George Griffies, he assumed by Royal sign manual the additional surname of Williams in 1785. The title became extinct on the death of the third Baronet in 1877.

The family seat was Llwynywermod, near Myddfai, Llandovery, Carmarthenshire.

== Griffies-Williams baronets, of Llwyny Wormwood (1815) ==
- Sir George Griffies-Williams, 1st Baronet (c. 1759–1843)

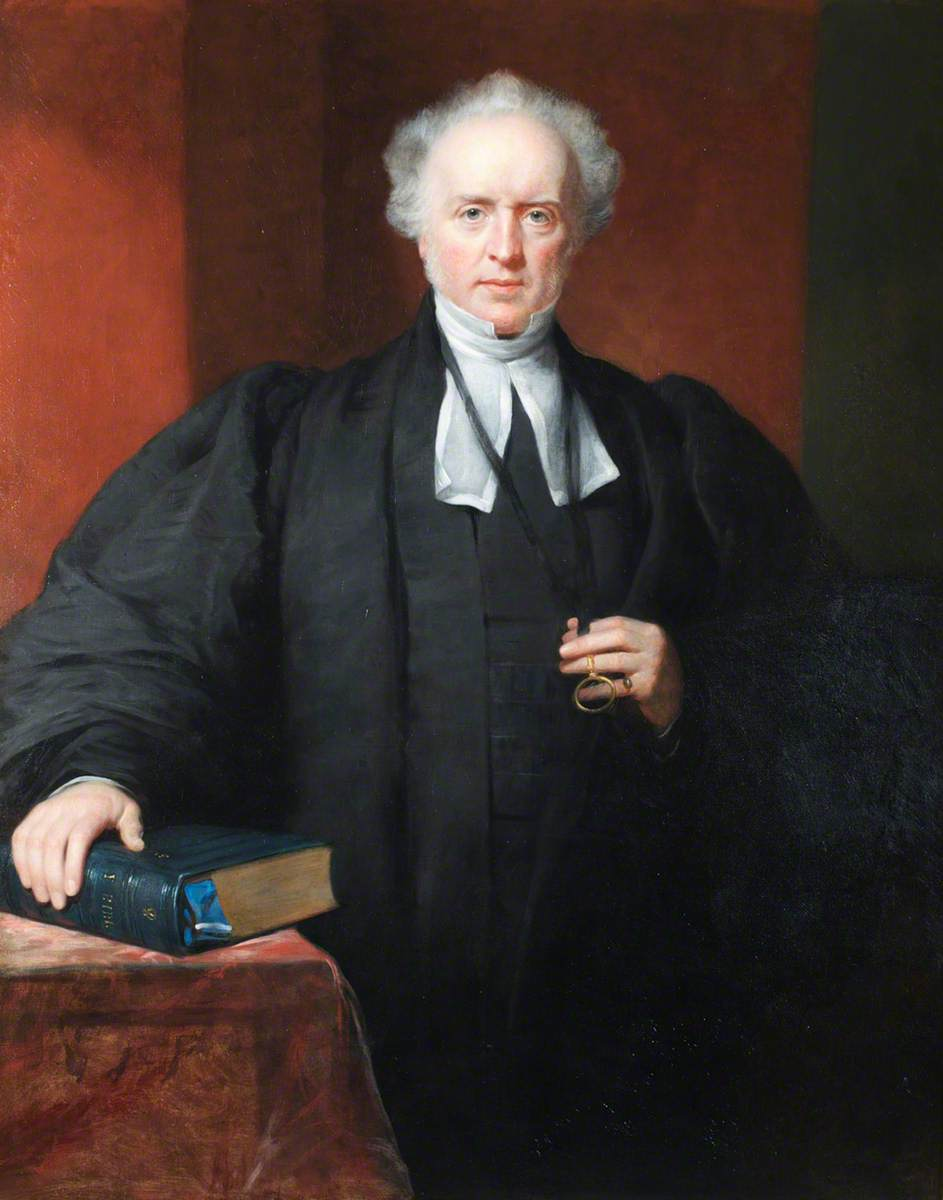
The Reverend Sir Erasmus Henry Griffies-Williams, 1850s portrait attributed to Eden Upton Eddis

- Sir Erasmus Henry Griffies-Williams, 2nd Baronet (1794–1870)
- Sir Watkin Lewes Griffies-Williams, 3rd Baronet (c. 1800–1877)

Baronetage of the United Kingdom
Preceded by Dundas baronets	Griffies-Williams of Llwyny Wormwood; 22 May 1815	Succeeded by Jackson baronets
