= Sir David Dundas, 1st Baronet =

Sir David Dundas, 1st Baronet of Richmond

Sir David Dundas, 1st Baronet (7 December 1749 – 10 January 1826) was a surgeon who was created 1st Baronet of Richmond.

Dundas was the son of Ralph Dundas and Mary née Ferguson. He was appointed Sergeant Surgeon to King George III in 1792. He was Household Apothecary at Kew but not officially Apothecary to the King. He assisted at the post mortem on Princess Charlotte on 7 November 1817 and was Physician to the Duke of Kent from 1816 to 1817 and Surgeon to the Duke of Kent from 1818 to 1820.

Dundas was a prominent figure in the Royal College of Surgeons and was Master of the college in 1804, 1811 and 1819. He was made a baronet in 1815.

He married 20 July 1775, Isabella Robertson (died 1827), and had twelve children, three of whom became respectively second (William), third (Major General James Fullerton) and fourth (Admiral John) Baronets. The Baronetcy became extinct on the death of the fourth Baronet.

== Sources ==
- Dundas David Sir. 1st Bt

Baronetage of the United Kingdom
New creation	Baronet (of Richmond); 1815–1820	Succeeded by William Dundas
