= Adelaide Cottage =

House in Windsor Home Park, Berkshire, England

Coordinates: 51°28′45″N 0°35′25″W

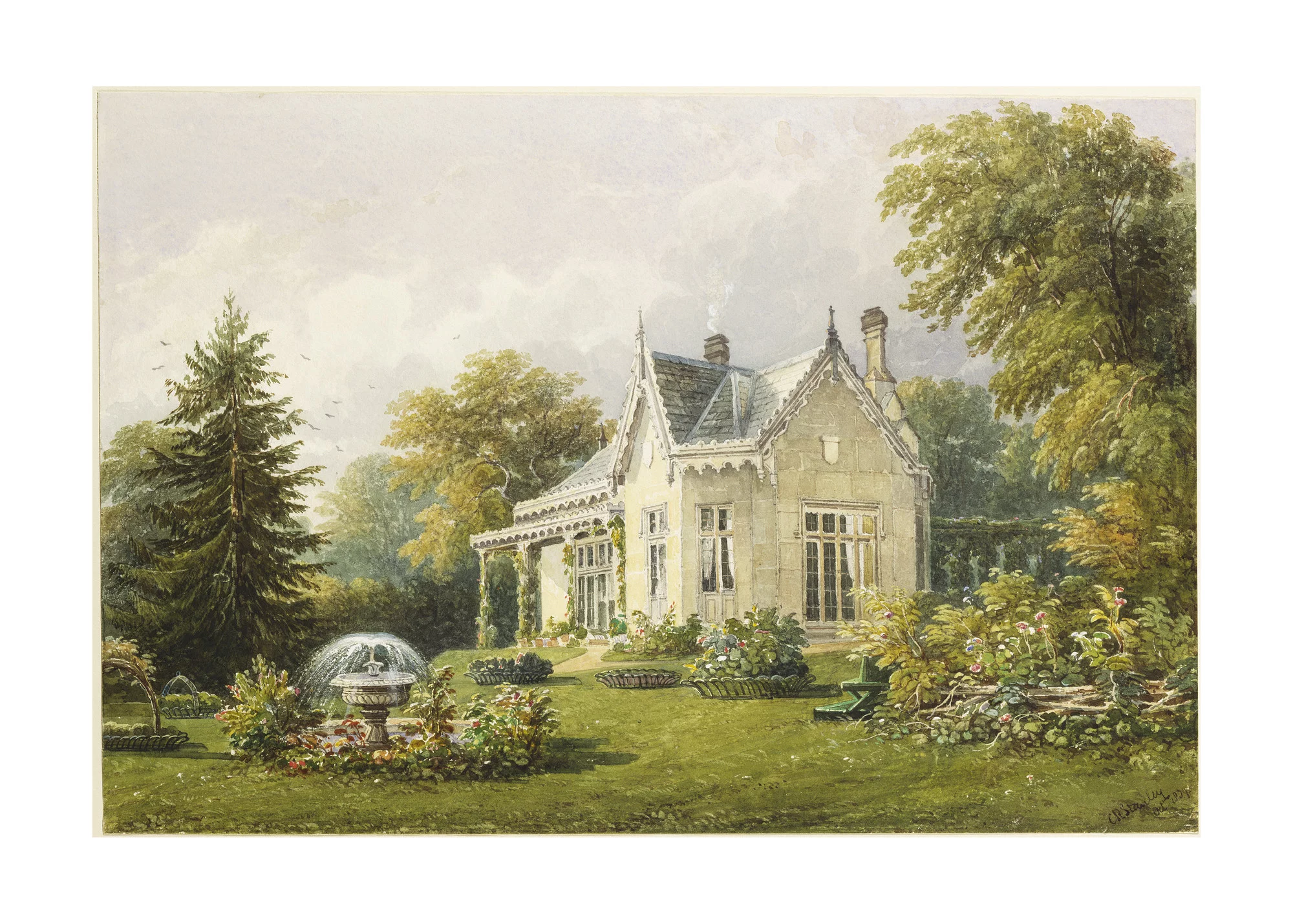
- An 1839 rendering of the cottage as originally built

- Location within Berkshire
- Former names: Adelaide Lodge

General information
- Type: House
- Architectural style: Picturesque
- Location: Windsor, Berkshire, England
- Year built: 1831
- Owner: Crown Estate

Design and construction
- Architect: Jeffry Wyatville

Listed Building – Grade II*
- Official name: Adelaide Cottage
- Designated: 2 October 1975
- Reference no.: 1319270

Adelaide Cottage (formerly known as Adelaide Lodge) is a house in Windsor Home Park just east of Windsor Castle, in Berkshire, England. Built in 1831 for Queen Adelaide, it was previously the home of the Prince and Princess of Wales and their children.

== Design ==
The cottage incorporates building materials of John Nash's Royal Lodge from Windsor Great Park. At the time of construction in 1831, it was described as "chastely elegant" and having two public rooms, in addition to a retiring room for the queen, and a pages' room, as well as furnishings from the former royal lodge and a marble fireplace mantel in the regency Graeco-Egyptian style.

The present cottage has four bedrooms. The ceiling of its principal bedroom reuses decorative elements, including gilt dolphins and ropes, from the former royal yacht, HMY Royal George. It has been Grade II* listed on the National Heritage List for England since October 1975. Adelaide Cottage is located in Windsor Home Park.

== History ==
In 1831 under the supervision of architect Jeffry Wyatville, the house was erected in the picturesque style for Queen Adelaide. Later, Queen Victoria often visited the residence for breakfast and tea.

Group Captain Peter Townsend, equerry to King George VI, was given the property as a grace-and-favour residence in 1944. Townsend referred to the cottage as an "icebox" with only two radiators. Simon Rhodes, the son of Queen Elizabeth II's cousin Margaret Rhodes, previously resided at the cottage. Major renovations took place in 2015, with the historical architecture still intact. In the summer of 2022, Adelaide Cottage became the home of William, Prince of Wales, and Catherine, Princess of Wales, and their children, Prince George, Princess Charlotte and Prince Louis. The family paid market rent. It was reported in November 2025 that they had moved to the larger Forest Lodge in Windsor Great Park.

== See also ==
- Kensington Palace, the official London residence of the Prince and Princess of Wales
- Anmer Hall, part of the Sandringham estate in Norfolk, the country residence of the Prince and Princess of Wales
- Llwynywermod, a house in Carmarthenshire, Wales, former residence of the King and Queen, owned by the Duchy of Cornwall
- Grade II* listed buildings in Berkshire
