= Dundas baronets =

There have been four baronetcies created for persons with the surname Dundas, one in the Baronetage of Great Britain and three in the Baronetage of the United Kingdom. One creation is extant as of 2026.

- Dundas baronets, of Kerse (1762): see the Marquess of Zetland
- Dundas baronets of Richmond (1815)
- Dundas baronets of Beechwood (1821)
- Dundas baronets of Arniston (1898)
