= Jackson baronets of Arlsey (1815) =

Escutcheon of the Jackson baronets of Arlsey

The Jackson baronetcy, of Arlsey in the County of Bedford, was created in the Baronetage of the United Kingdom on 22 May 1815 for John Jackson. He was a Director of the Honourable East India Company and also represented Dover in the House of Commons.

As of 2026 the baronetcy is considered dormant.

== Jackson baronets, of Arlsey (1815) ==
- Sir John Jackson, 1st Baronet (1763–1820)
- Sir Keith Alexander Jackson, 2nd Baronet (1798–1843)
- Sir Mountstuart Goodricke Jackson, 3rd Baronet (1836–1857)
- Sir Keith George Jackson, 4th Baronet (1842–1916)
- Sir Robert Montresor Jackson, 5th Baronet (1876–1940)
- Sir John Montresor Jackson, 6th Baronet (1914–1980)
- Sir Robert Jackson, 7th Baronet (1910–2000). Lived in Uruguay, died 17 April 2000, with heir his kinsman below in New Zealand.
- Sir Keith Arnold Jackson, 8th Baronet (1921–2000). A grandson of Welby Charles Jackson, grandson of the 1st Baronet, he died on 11 November 2000 the presumed Baronet.
- Sir Neil Keith Jackson, 9th Baronet (born 1952). Not on the Official Roll.

The heir apparent is the present presumed holder's son Stephen Keith Jackson (b. 1973).

== Notes ==
Baronetage of the United Kingdom
Preceded by Griffies-Williams baronets	Jackson baronets of Arlsey; 22 May 1815	Succeeded by Seton-Steuart baronets
