= Clarence House =

Royal residence in London

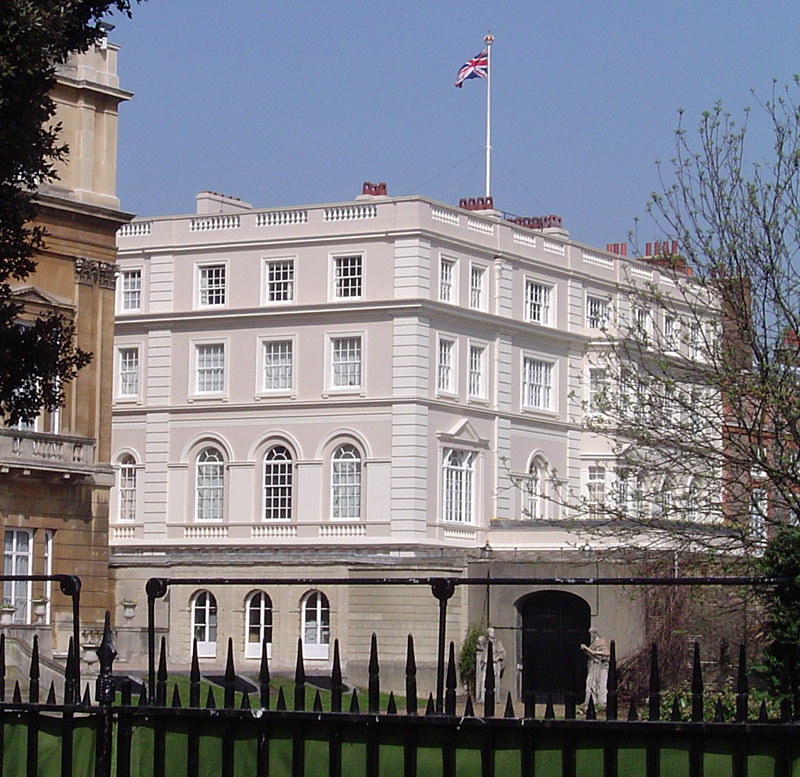
- April 2006

- Location within City of Westminster

General information
- Type: British royal residence
- Architectural style: Regency
- Location: The Mall, London, United Kingdom
- Coordinates: 51°30′14″N 0°08′19″W
- Elevation: 16 m (52 ft)
- Named for: Prince William, Duke of Clarence
- Construction started: 1825
- Completed: 1827
- Owner: King Charles III in right of the Crown

Technical details
- Floor count: 4

Design and construction
- Architect: John Nash

Website
- www.royal.uk/royal-residences-clarence-house

Listed Building – Grade I
- Official name: Clarence House
- Designated: 5 February 1970
- Reference no.: 1236580

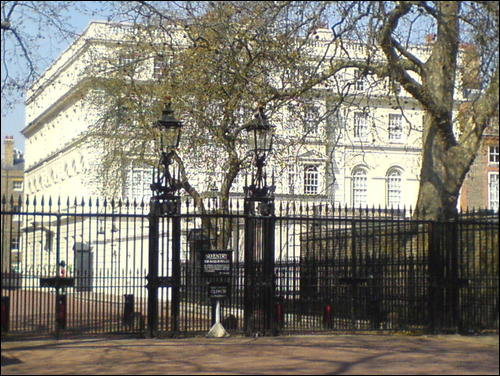
Viewed from The Mall in 2008

Clarence House is a royal residence located near The Mall in the City of Westminster. It has been the primary London residence of Charles III and Queen Camilla since 2003. Clarence House was built in 1825–1827, adjacent to St James's Palace, for the royal Duke of Clarence, the future King William IV.

The four-storey house is faced in pale render. Over the years, it has undergone extensive remodelling and reconstruction, most notably after being heavily damaged in the Second World War by enemy bombing during The Blitz. Little remains of the original structure designed by John Nash. It is Grade I listed on the National Heritage List for England. The house is open to visitors for about one month each summer, usually in August.

Like William IV, Charles III remained at Clarence House when he became king. King Charles III and Queen Camilla would continue to reside at Clarence House, while nearby Buckingham Palace serves as the headquarters of the monarchy, where they hold official events. Charles’s mother and grandmother had previously occupied the home. Princess Elizabeth, the future Elizabeth II, had Clarence House as her official residence from 1947 until her accession to the throne in 1952. From 1953 to 2002, it was home to Queen Elizabeth the Queen Mother.

== History ==
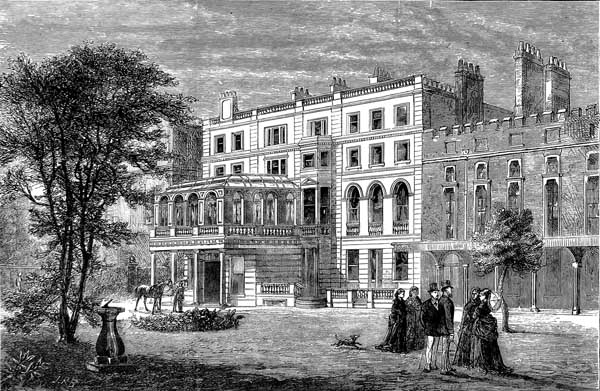
Engraving of Clarence House (1874)

Clarence House was built between 1825 and 1827 to a design by John Nash on the site of 16th century apartments constructed during the reign of Henry VIII. It was commissioned by the Duke of Clarence, who in 1830 became King William IV of the United Kingdom (reigned 1830–1837). The duke moved there rather than to the adjoining St James's Palace, an antiquated Tudor building which he found too cramped. After becoming king, he stayed at Clarence House, instead of moving to Buckingham Palace, and had John Nash create a direct passageway into the State Apartments of St James's Palace, where he could conduct royal business. Built on palace grounds, Clarence House faces greenspace and The Mall and is next to Stable Yard road, across which lies Lancaster House.

After William IV's death in 1837, the house passed to his sister Princess Augusta Sophia, and, following her death in 1840, to Queen Victoria's mother, Princess Victoria, Duchess of Kent. In 1866 it became the London home of Queen Victoria's second son, Prince Alfred, Duke of Edinburgh, until his death in 1900.

Queen Victoria's third son, Prince Arthur, Duke of Connaught and Strathearn, used the house from 1900 until his death in 1942. During his tenure, for a brief period in the 1930s, the library of the School of Oriental and African Studies was there until all universities in London were evacuated in 1939. The school then relocated temporarily to Cambridge.

During World War II, Clarence House suffered damage by enemy bombing during the Blitz (1940–1941). Following the death of the Duke of Connaught in 1942, it was used by the Red Cross and the St John Ambulance Brigade as their headquarters during the rest of World War II.

After their marriage in 1947, it became the residence of Princess Elizabeth and her husband, Philip, Duke of Edinburgh. Their daughter, Princess Anne, was born there in August 1950. Princess Elizabeth acceded to the throne as Queen Elizabeth II in 1952 and moved to Buckingham Palace the following year; her mother, Queen Elizabeth The Queen Mother, and sister, Princess Margaret, moved into Clarence House.

Princess Margaret later moved into an apartment in Kensington Palace following her marriage in 1960, while the Queen Mother remained in residence at Clarence House until her death in March 2002. Charles, then Prince of Wales, took up residence there in 2003. Clarence House was also the official residence of Prince William from 2003 until April 2011, and of Prince Harry from 2003 until March 2012.

Clarence House is the London residence of King Charles III and his wife, Queen Camilla. They have announced that they will continue to use Clarence House as their London home after completion of renovations to Buckingham Palace in 2027.

Tenants of Clarence House

- William IV and Queen Adelaide (1827–1837)
- Victoria, Duchess of Kent and Strathearn (1841–1861)
- Prince Alfred, Duke of Edinburgh, and Maria, Duchess of Edinburgh (1866–1900)
- Prince Arthur, Duke of Connaught and Strathearn, and Princess Louise, Duchess of Connaught and Strathearn (1901–1942)
- Princess Elizabeth, Duchess of Edinburgh, and Philip, Duke of Edinburgh, with their children, Charles and Anne (1947–1952)
- Queen Elizabeth, the Queen Mother (1953–2002)
- Princess Margaret, Countess of Snowdon (1953–1960)
- King Charles III and Queen Camilla (2003–present)
- Prince William of Wales (2003–2011)
- Prince Harry of Wales (2003–2012)
