= Grace and favour =

Rent-free home provided by the monarch

A grace-and-favour home is a residential property owned by a monarch, government, or other owner and leased rent-free to a person as part of the perquisites of their employment, or in gratitude for services rendered.

Usage of the term is chiefly British. In the United Kingdom, these homes are mostly owned by the Crown or a charity and, in modern times, are often within the gift of the prime minister. Most of these properties are taxed as a "benefit in kind", although this status does not apply to Downing Street or any home granted for security purposes, such as the residence of the Secretary of State for Northern Ireland. They are at times granted to senior politicians.

It is possible that the term crept into English through the writings of Niccolò Machiavelli, who wrote of advisers who are ministers per grazia e concessione, which has been translated as "through grace and favour".

== England ==
In 1986, 120 grace-and-favour apartments were owned by the monarch, the most splendid being at Kensington Palace where the Prince and Princess of Wales, Duke and Duchess of Gloucester, and Prince and Princess Michael of Kent lived. There are also some at Windsor Castle, and Buckingham Palace. St James's Palace had 20 apartments. Lord Kitchener once lived there, as did the Duke of Windsor. Most apartments are modest, some two rooms, inhabited mostly by retired members of the household staff. Hampton Court Palace apartments were generally occupied by retired soldiers and diplomats or (more usually) by their widows. Grace and favour apartments have been discontinued at Hampton Court following a major fire there caused by a grace and favour resident. There were once 69. In 1986, this had dwindled to 15.

In the latter part of Queen Victoria's reign, Frogmore Cottage in the Home Park, Windsor, was the grace and favour residence of her Indian attendant, Abdul Karim (the Munshi). In 2018, it was renovated for Prince Harry, Duke of Sussex and Meghan, Duchess of Sussex, who moved into it in the spring of 2019.

Other residences include (though those in Downing Street have considerable meeting rooms, court and office parts):

- 10 Downing Street, City of Westminster – official residence of the First Lord of the Treasury (now always the prime minister of the United Kingdom)
- Chequers, Ellesborough, Buckinghamshire – official country house of the prime minister
- 11 Downing Street, Westminster – official residence of the chancellor of the exchequer (Second Lord of the Treasury)
- 12 Downing Street, Westminster – formerly the official residence of the chief whip, now the site of the Downing Street Press Office
- Dorneywood, Burnham – official ministerial residence; a country residence usually for use of the chancellor, or for the deputy prime minister (used by chancellor during the May ministry)
- Admiralty House, Westminster – official ministerial residence
- 1 Carlton Gardens, Westminster – official ministerial residence; usually for the foreign secretary
- Speaker's House, Palace of Westminster, Westminster – official residence of the Commons' Speaker
- Lord Speaker's Apartments, Palace of Westminster, Westminster – official residence of the Lord Speaker
- Nottingham Cottage at Kensington Palace – previously occupied by members of the royal family or by senior courtiers
- Garden House, Mayfair – official residence of the Commonwealth Secretary-General
- Adelaide Cottage – a royal family property located just 10 minutes' walk from the King's residence in Windsor, now the home of the Prince and Princess of Wales and their children
- The houses of Vicars' Close, owned by Wells Cathedral and occupied by its choir, since the 14th century.

== Northern Ireland ==
- Hillsborough Castle, Hillsborough – official ministerial residence for the Northern Ireland Secretary

== Scotland ==
- Bute House, Charlotte Square, Edinburgh – official residence of the First Minister of Scotland
- Tulliallan Castle, Kincardine, Fife – official residence of the Chief Constable of Police Scotland
- Moderator's Flat, Rothesay Terrace – official residence of the Moderator of the General Assembly of the Church of Scotland

== In popular culture ==
Mary Treadgold's novel for children, The Winter Princess (1962), concerns a child who comes to stay in a grace and favour apartment at Hampton Court.

== Gallery ==
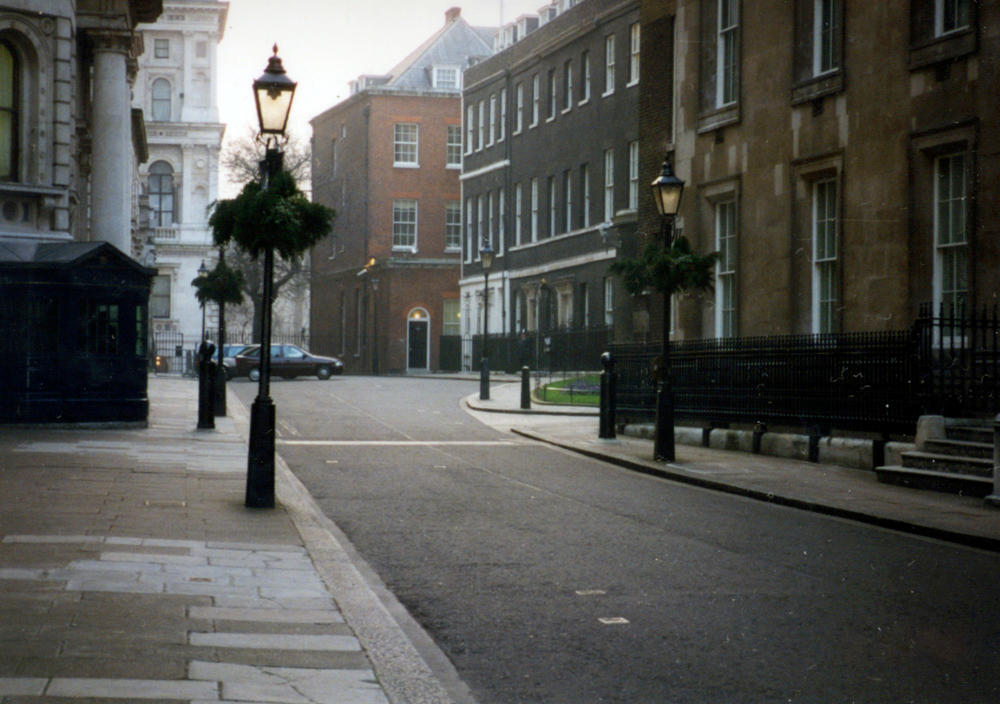
View of numbers 10, 11, and 12 Downing Street – official residences of the First Lord of the Treasury (Prime Minister), Second Lord of the Treasury (Chancellor of the Exchequer), and the Chief Whip

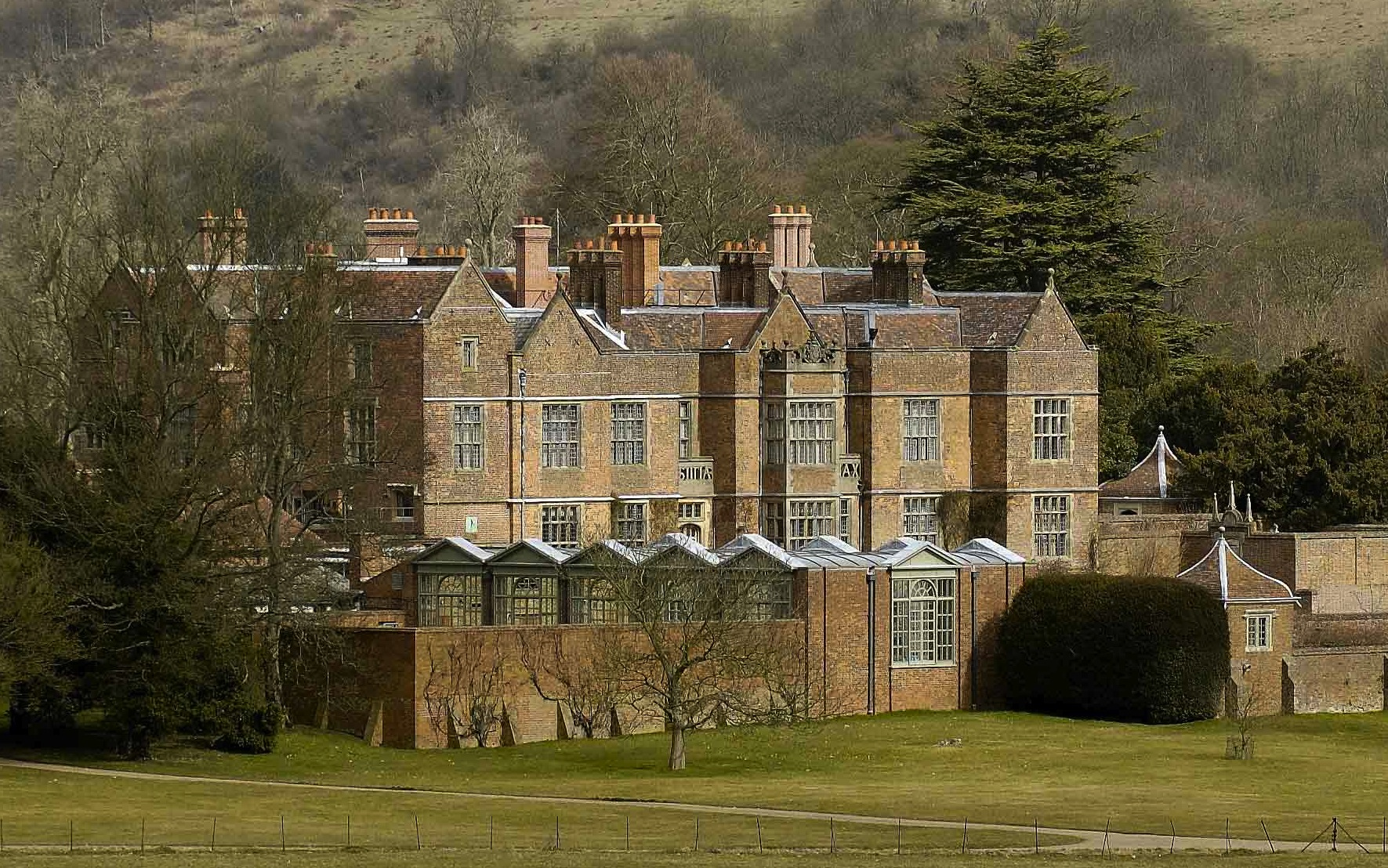
Chequers – official country residence of the Prime Minister

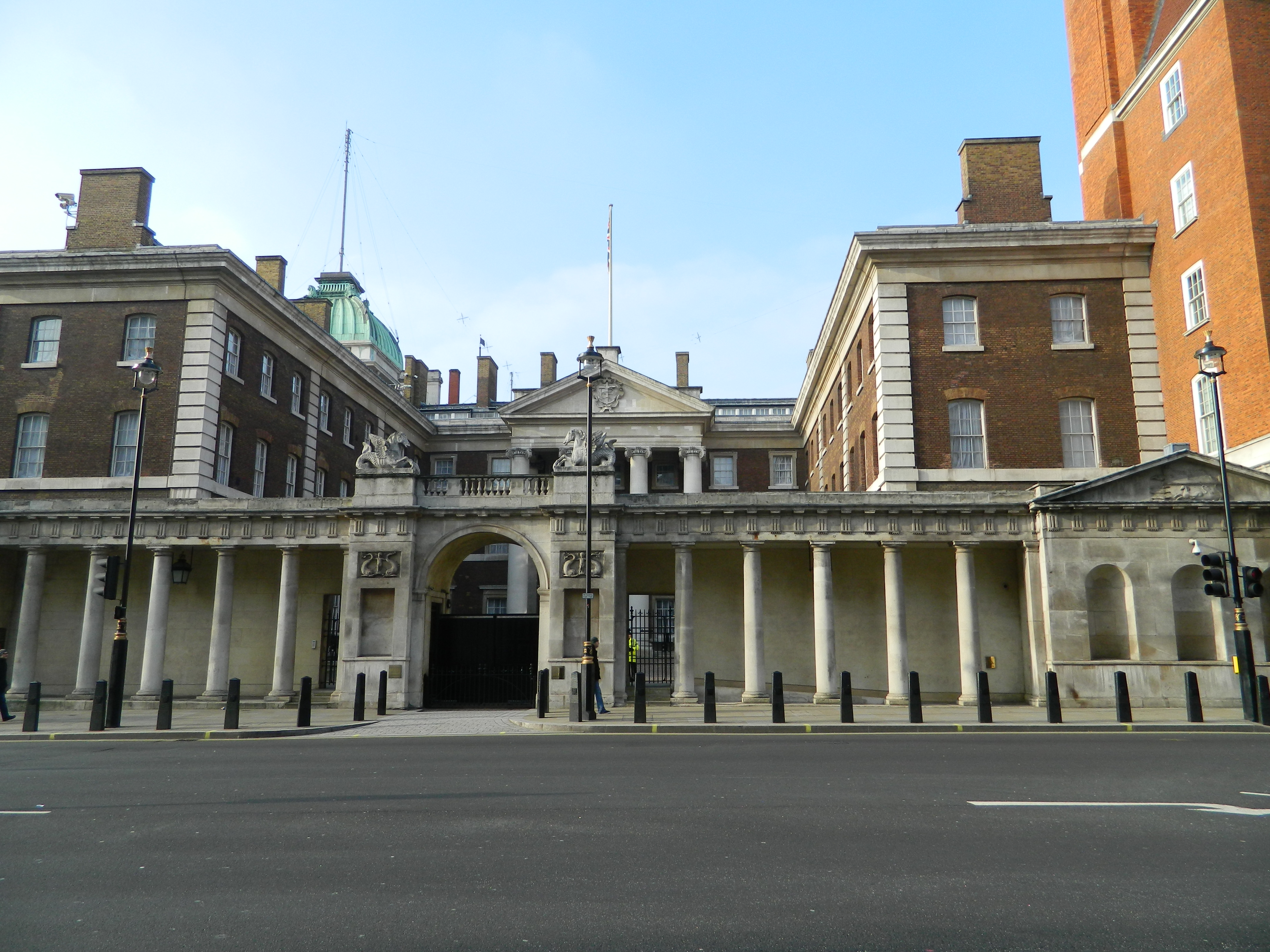
Admiralty House – official ministerial residence

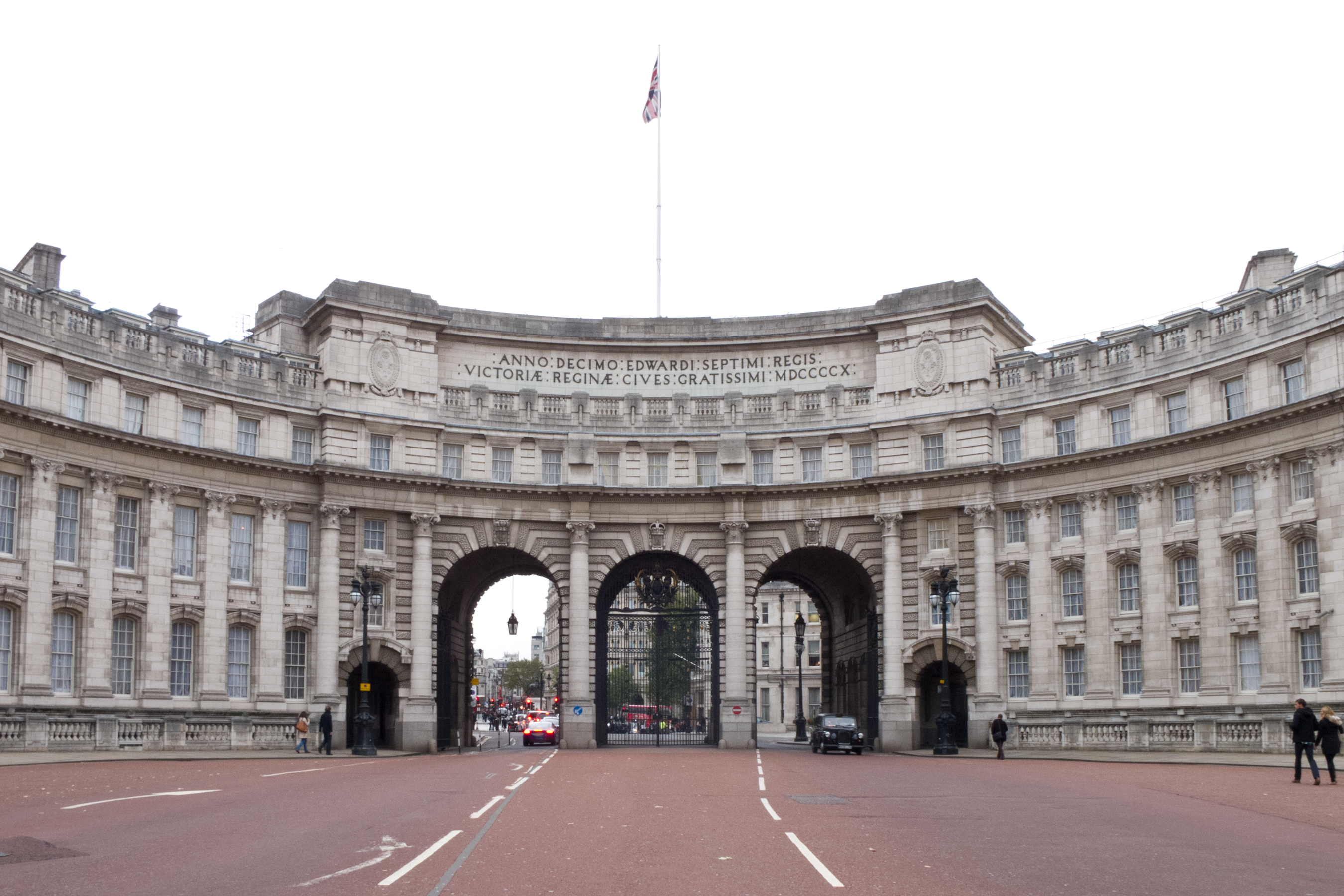
Admiralty Arch – formerly an official ministerial residence

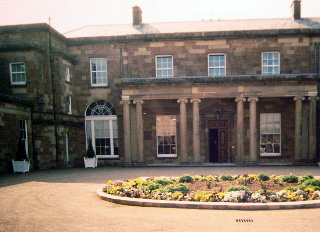
Hillsborough Castle – official ministerial residence for the Secretary of State for Northern Ireland

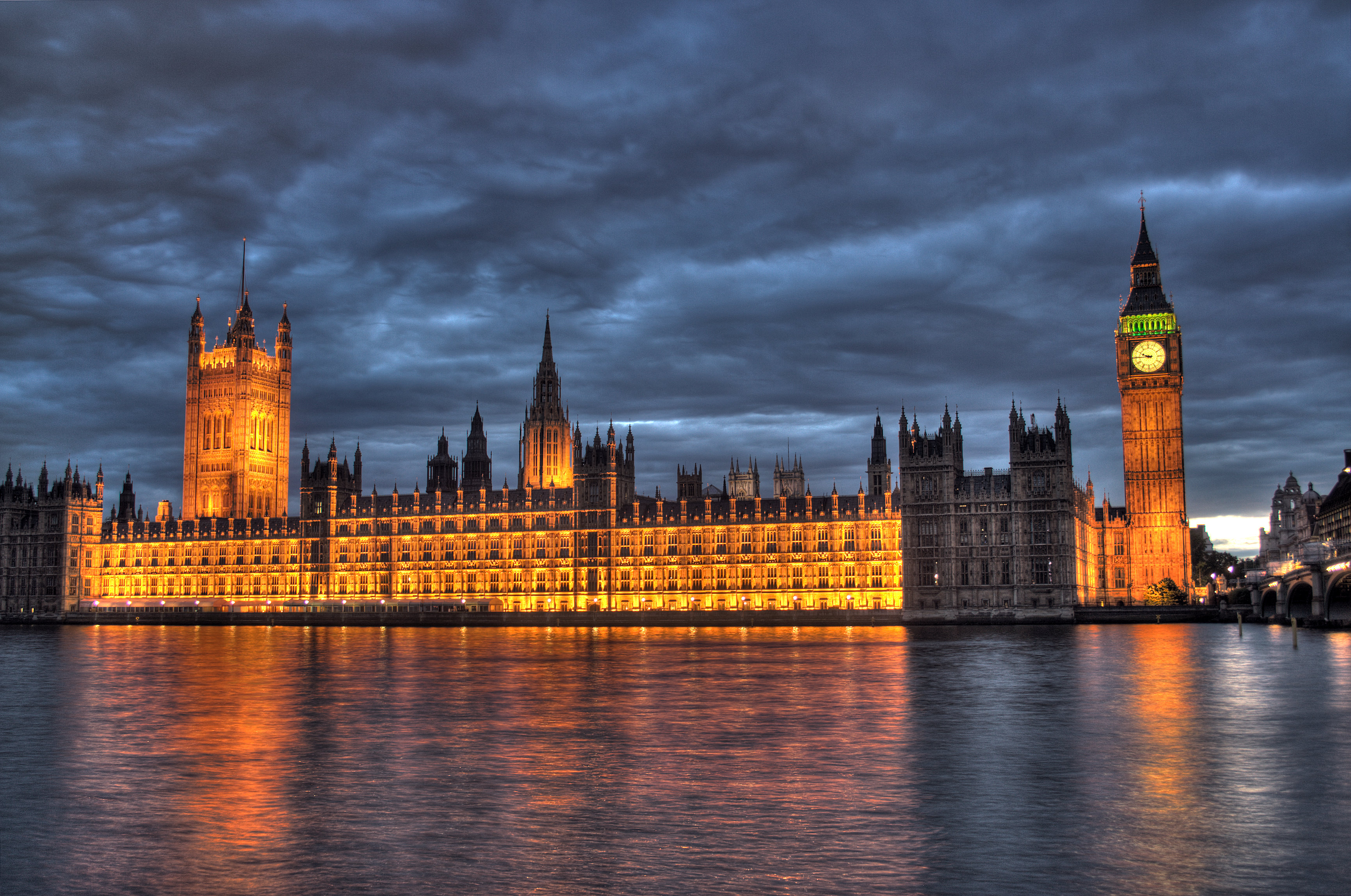
Palace of Westminster – housing the official residences of the Speaker of the House of Commons and the Lord Speaker of the House of Lords

== See also ==
- Royal Parks of London
