= Seton-Steuart baronets =

Extinct baronetcy in the Baronetage of the United Kingdom

The Steuart, later Seton-Steuart Baronetcy, of Allanton in the County of Lanark, was a title in the Baronetage of the United Kingdom. It was created on 22 May 1815 for Henry Steuart with special remainder to his son-in-law Reginald Macdonald. The second Baronet assumed the additional surname of Seton. The title became extinct on the death of the fifth Baronet in 1930.

== Steuart, later Seton-Steuart baronets, of Allanton (1815) ==
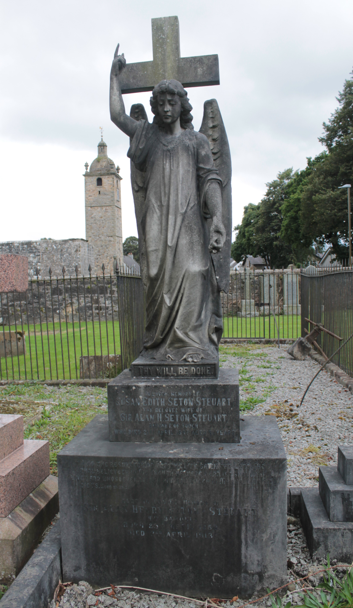
The grave of Sir Alan Henry Seton-Steuart, St Ninian's Churchyard, Stirling

- Sir Henry Steuart, 1st Baronet of Allanton and Touch (1759–1836)
- Sir Reginald Macdonald Seton-Steuart, 2nd Baronet (died 1838)
- Sir Henry James Seton-Steuart, 3rd Baronet (1812–1884)
- Sir Alan Henry Seton-Steuart, 4th Baronet (1856–1913)
- Sir Douglas Archibald Seton-Steuart, 5th Baronet (1857–1930)

Coat of arms of Seton-Steuart of Allanton
Crest Out of an earl’s coronet a dexter hand grasping a thistle all Proper. Escutcheon Or, a fesse cheeky Azure and Argent, surmounted of a bend Gules, charged with three buckles of the Field; on a sinister canton of the Fourth a lion passant-guardant Or pierced with a dart Proper, and in base a broken spear surmounted of a helmet both Proper. Supporters Two lions rampant-guardant both Proper, armed and langued Gules, collared of the Last, charged with three buckles Or. Motto Virtutis in rello praemium (The reward of valour in war); Over the crest: Juvant aspera fortes (Difficulties delight the brave)

Baronetage of the United Kingdom
Preceded by Jackson baronets	Seton-Steuart baronets of Allanton; 22 May 1815	Succeeded by Simeon baronets
