= Forest Lodge, Windsor =

House in Windsor, England

Coordinates: 51°26′35″N 0°38′13″W

Forest Lodge
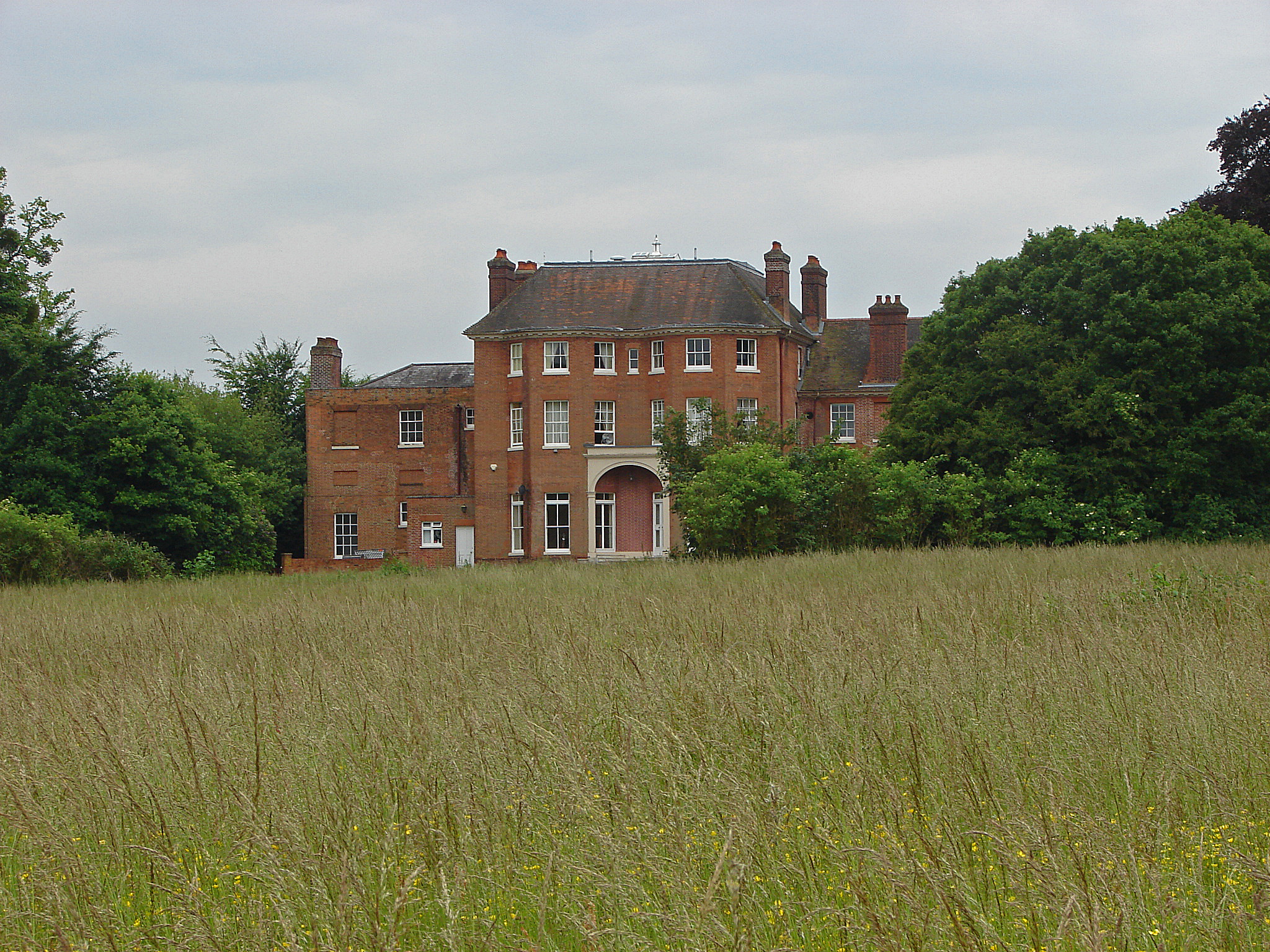
- Forest Lodge in Windsor Great Park, June 2013

- Location within Berkshire
- Former names: Holly Grove

General information
- Type: House
- Architectural style: Georgian
- Location: Old Windsor, Berkshire, England
- Current tenants: The Prince and Princess of Wales
- Owner: Crown Estate

Listed Building – Grade II
- Official name: Forest Lodge
- Designated: 3 March 1972
- Reference no.: 1323667

Forest Lodge is a Grade II listed Georgian mansion in Windsor Great Park, built in the 1770s and enlarged in the early 20th century, it has been listed on the National Heritage List for England since March 1972. As of 2025, it is the primary residence of the Prince and Princess of Wales and their three children.

== History ==
=== Holly Grove, Virginia Water, Flitcroft and Sandby ===
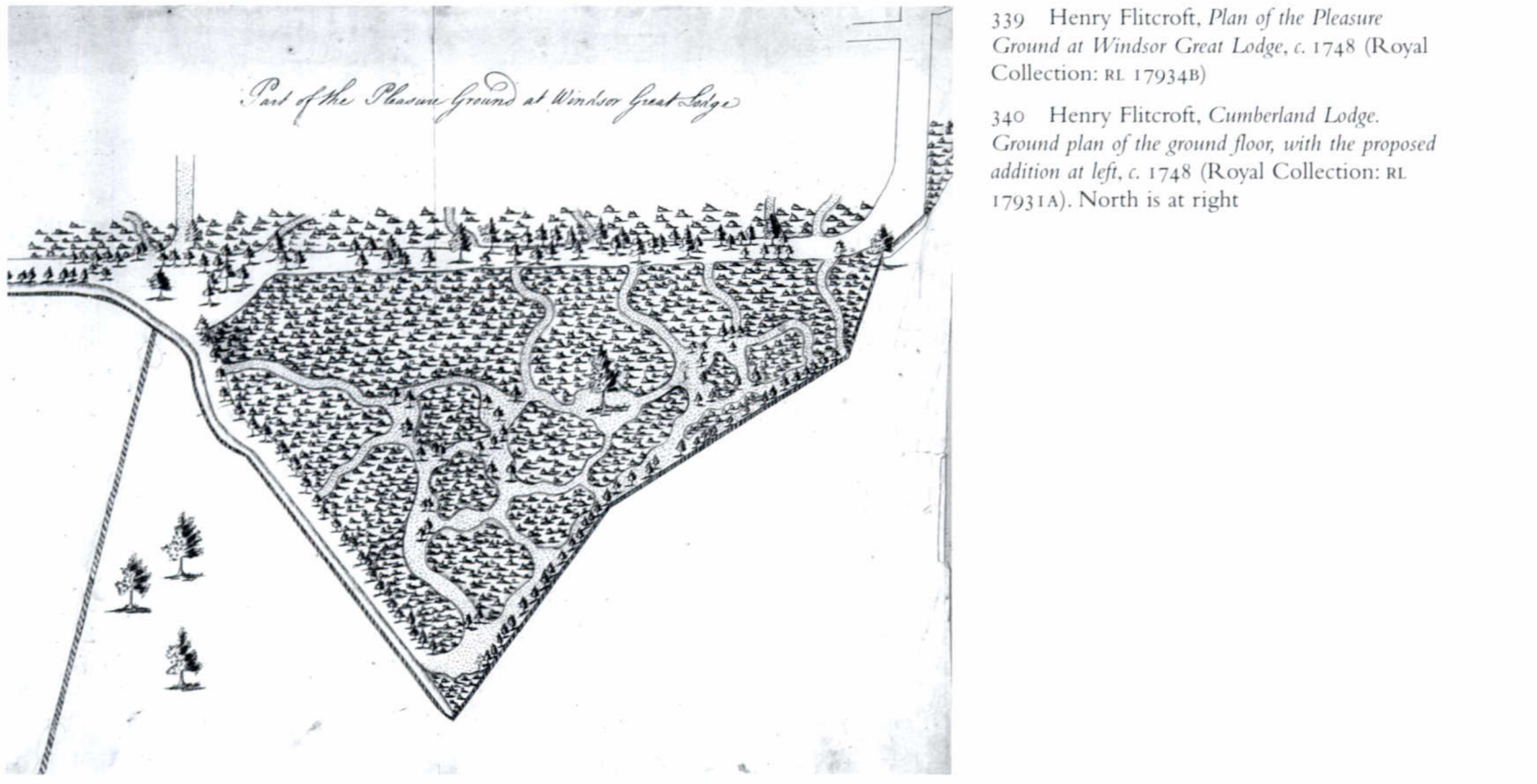
Henry Flitcroft's c.1748 design: "Part of the Pleasure Ground at Windsor Great (later Cumberland) Lodge which abutted 'Holley Rideing'”

The earliest conveyance relating to the property containing a small cottage with 2 acres (8,100 m^{2}) of land annexed to it was in 1697. In 1772, the estate was purchased by John Deacon who was Groom of the Bedchamber to Henry Frederick, Duke of Cumberland between 1767 and the duke's death in 1790. Thomas Sandby's plans for 'Holly-grove House' were adapted c. 1772 – 1778 from a design by Henry Flitcroft who had earlier made plans for improving Windsor Great Lodge (later Cumberland Lodge), about a mile away from Holly Grove. The plans for the house, 'a three-bay central block with flanking two-storey wings', is what is seen today. Flitcroft and his assistant Sandby collaborated to design much of Holly Grove's surrounding landscape including pleasure grounds and a new 'Great Bridge' to straddle the Windsor Great Park's Virginia Water Lake.

=== 19th century ===
In 1803, the house and its estate was bought by Spencer Mackay who owned sugar plantations in the Caribbean: the Lusignan, Cane Grove, and Annadale estates in British Guiana. He is listed on the Legacies of British Slave ownership database of the Centre for the Study of the Legacies of British Slavery. Holly Grove covered an expansive acreage: "from both fronts the house commands varied and extensive views over the forest [and] the Great Park". In 1851 'Holly-grove' was described as being "west of Windsor Forest where, on its eastern margin at Bishop's Gate commences the principal approach to the celebrated lake called Virginia Water."

Holly Grove estate first drew royal interest in 1823, but was not then purchased. It was finally acquired for the Crown on 27 June 1829, during the premiership of Arthur Wellesley, 1st Duke of Wellington and remained the residence of the Deputy Ranger of Windsor Great Park. Other early occupants included Sir William Fremantle, Francis Seymour, 5th Marquess of Hertford, and Augustus Liddle.

The house was the residence of the Deputy Ranger of Windsor Great Park until the retirement of Sir Malcolm Murray in 1937. In 1860, it was "difficult to obtain an order" to fish in Virginia Water; "the Deputy Ranger of Windsor Great Park - Col. F. H. Seymour - lived at Holly Grove, Windsor Park" and it was only he who "granted them".

=== 20th century ===
In 1936 Edward VIII told Murray's successor, Sir Eric Savill, that he wished Forest Lodge to be let to Sir John Aird, his Equerry. The Royal Librarian, Jane Roberts, in her book on Windsor Great Park, Royal Landscape, recorded that the house's name was debated in 1936–37, as Aird thought the name 'Holly Grove' was 'distasteful'. Alternatives such as "Ranger's Lodge" and "Forest Lodge" were considered. It was subsequently renovated to designs by the architectural firm Richardson & Gill.

Later residents have included Francis Napier, 15th Lord Napier. In December 1975 The Daily Telegraph reported that Forest Lodge was being "strongly tipped" as a potential house for Anne, Princess Royal and Mark Phillips. The lease was held by Lady Priscilla Aird, widow to the previous tenant, Sir John Aird, prior to his suicide. In January 1998 reports that Elizabeth II was planning to gift Forest Lodge to Sarah, Duchess of York were described as "wide of the mark" by The Daily Telegraph as the house was part of the Crown Estate and not in the personal gift of the Queen. In April 1998 the property was offered on a 20-year lease through Knight Frank. The estimated value of Forest Lodge was £3 million in 1998.

=== 21st century ===
In 2001 the property underwent a £1.5 million restoration to conserve its period features; it was subsequently let on the open market. In 2025 a planning application by the Royal Household for minor internal and external alterations was approved, allowing changes including new doors and windows, removal of some internal walls, ceiling repairs and new floors.

In August 2025, it was reported that William, Prince of Wales, and Catherine, Princess of Wales, along with their children, Prince George, Princess Charlotte and Prince Louis, intend to relocate there from Adelaide Cottage by Christmas. They were also reported to be covering renovation and relocation costs themselves and to be paying open market rent. It was reported that they held a 20-year non-assignable lease with quarterly rental payments and no upfront deposit, having financed the internal refurbishment works themselves. As the lease was short term, responsibility for external repair and refurbishment costs remained with the Crown Estate. According to a report by the National Audit Office, the Crown Estate spent £400,000 renovating the property. The family were reported to have moved in November 2025. The couple pays around £307,000 in rent per year. In May 2026, it was reported that the couple had paid around £40,000 in stamp duty on the lease of the property.

== Architecture ==
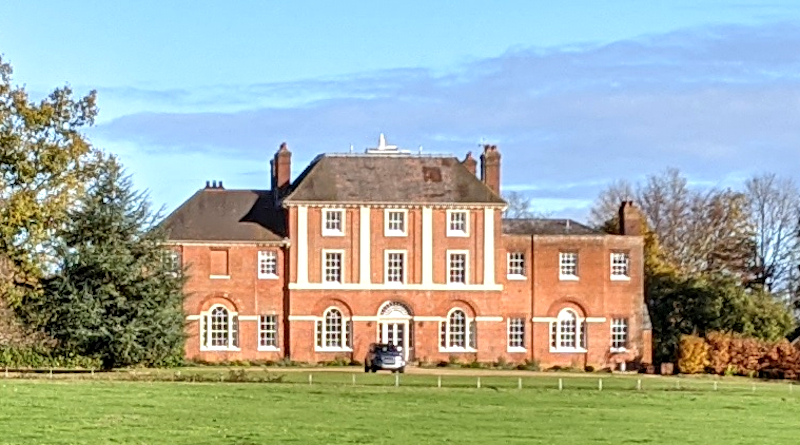
Entrance front (southwest side)

Forest Lodge is a Georgian mansion of red brick, built in the 1770s and later altered. Its exterior features Flemish-bond brickwork, a slate and tile roof, six chimneys, and nine bay windows. The symmetrical nine-bay frontage includes a three-bay projecting central block flanked by two-storey side wings. The entrance is decorated with stuccoed pilasters supporting a dentil cornice, with recessed Venetian windows and a central doorway. The sash windows have gauged brick arches, and stucco bandcourses run along the first-floor level. The house was sensitively enlarged in the 19th and early 20th centuries while retaining its Georgian character. However, the roofs of the side wings are of different heights, which disrupts the obligatory baroque symmetry of Georgian architecture.

The house contains eight bedrooms, six bathrooms, a long gallery, and a principal drawing room accessed from a central hall. A self-contained staff flat forms part of the accommodation. A single-storey service wing was added to the rear in the 19th century. The grounds include a ha-ha, tennis court, large pond, lawns, and gardens.

Interior details include original stonework, plaster cornices and ceiling decoration, marble fireplaces, six-panelled doors, Venetian windows, and a barrel-vaulted hall ceiling. A major restoration in 2001 conserved these period features while updating services. Despite later additions, the building retains its Georgian style and was designated a Grade II listed building in 1972 for its historic and architectural interest.

== See also ==
- Anmer Hall, part of the Sandringham estate in Norfolk, the country residence of the Prince and Princess of Wales
- Kensington Palace, the official London residence of the Prince and Princess of Wales
- Llwynywermod, a house in Carmarthenshire, former residence of the King and Queen, owned by the Duchy of Cornwall

== Sources ==
- Roberts, Jane (1997). Royal Landscape: The Gardens and Parks of Windsor. Yale University Press. ISBN 978-0-300-07079-8.
