= Llwynywermod =

Country estate in Carmarthenshire, Wales

Coordinates: 51.9691°N 3.7913°W

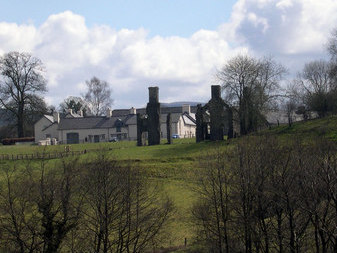
Llwynywermod was purchased by the Duchy of Cornwall for use by Charles III while he was the Prince of Wales.

Llwynywermod (Welsh: Llwynywermwd; Welsh pronunciation: [ɬʊi̯n.ə.wɛr.mʊd]), also known as Llwynywormwood, is an estate owned by the Duchy of Cornwall, just outside the Brecon Beacons National Park in Carmarthenshire, Wales. The 192-acre (0.78 km^{2}) estate is near the village of Myddfai, Llandovery, Carmarthenshire.

The nearest station is Llandovery, which is 2 miles (3.2km) from the estate.

== History ==
William Williams, a relative of Anne Boleyn, was the owner in the 13th or 14th century.

In 1815, George Griffies-Williams was created a baronet, and Llwynywermod became the seat of the Griffies-Williams baronets, General Sir Watkin Lewis Griffies Williams (1800–1877) was born at the family estate; he was the 3rd and last Baronet of the Griffies-Williams Baronetcy and also an officer in the British Indian Army.

In November 2006, Llwynywermod was purchased by the Duchy of Cornwall as a residence for the Duke of Cornwall in Wales. The duchy completed its purchase of the property in April 2007. Charles, Prince of Wales, and Camilla, Duchess of Cornwall (afterwards King Charles III and Queen Camilla) took up residence at the property in summer 2008. The interior of the property was designed by Camilla's sister Annabel Elliot. Charles continued to pay rent on the property after his accession to the throne in 2022, despite the Duchy of Cornwall passing to his son Prince William. In June 2023 it was reported that the King would not be renewing the lease on Llwynywermod after that summer, as he was unlikely to use it the same way as previously.

== Buildings ==
The three-bedroom farmhouse was converted into a residence for Prince Charles by Craig Hamilton Architects using traditional building techniques. It was once the coach house to the now ruined 13-bedroom country house of the Griffies-Williams family that stood nearby. The cottages on the farm named North Range and West Range adjoin the main house and are let as holiday accommodation.

== See also ==
- Highgrove House, near Tetbury, Gloucestershire, the family residence of the King and Queen, owned by the Duchy of Cornwall
- Kensington Palace, a residence of the British royal family and official London residence of the Prince and Princess of Wales
- Forest Lodge, in Windsor, the family residence of the Prince and Princess of Wales
- Anmer Hall, part of the Sandringham estate in Norfolk, the country residence of the Prince and Princess of Wales
