= Cultural depictions of Queen Victoria =

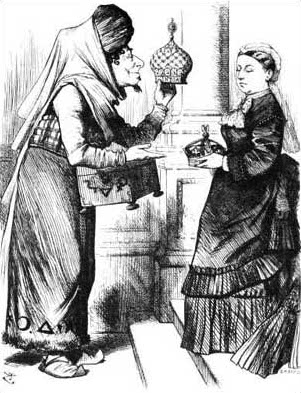
Victoria in a Punch cartoon, 1876

Queen Victoria has been portrayed or referenced many times.

== Literature ==
In 1937 Lord Chamberlain the Earl of Cromer ruled that no British sovereign may be portrayed on the British stage until 100 years after his or her accession. For this reason, Laurence Housman's play Victoria Regina (1935), which had earlier appeared at the Gate Theatre Studio in London with Pamela Stanley in the title role, could not have its British premiere until the centenary of Queen Victoria's accession, 20 June 1937. This was a Sunday, so the new premiere took place the next day, at the Lyric Theatre. Pamela Stanley reprised the title role at Housman's request, and Carl Esmond played Prince Albert. The play later appeared on Broadway, where Helen Hayes portrayed the Queen, with Vincent Price in the role of Prince Albert.

Vaughan Wilkins' novel And So-Victoria (1937) focuses on Victoria's life.

Queen Victoria appears in Alan Moore and Eddie Campbell's graphic novel From Hell, where she is depicted as instigating the Whitechapel murders.

A Royal Diaries book was written, documenting her childhood between 1829 and 1830: Victoria, May Blossom of Britannia by Anna Kirwan.

The Victorian age is experienced through the eyes of the fictional Morland family in The Abyss, The Hidden Shore, The Winter Journey, The Outcast, The Mirage, The Cause, The Homecoming and The Question, Volumes 18–25 respectively of The Morland Dynasty, a series of historical novels by author Cynthia Harrod-Eagles. One of the characters becomes Victoria's devoted lady-in-waiting.

Cynthia Harrod-Eagles also wrote I Victoria, a fictional autobiography of Queen Victoria.

There is a Sanskrit poem named Cakravarttini gunamanimala, written by T. Ganapati Sastri on Queen Victoria.

Another Sanskrit poem, titled Victoria Carita Sangraha, was written by scholar Keralavarman on the occasion of the Golden Jubilee of the coronation of Queen Victoria.

Although she did not live to see the Victorian age, Letitia Elizabeth Landon (L. E. L.) wrote a number of poetic tributes to the young princess and queen. These are:

- Fisher's Drawing Room Scrap Book, 1832. 'The Princess Victoria', to accompany a plate drawn by Anthony Stewart and engraved by T. Woolnoth. (This plate is in some editions, entitled 'The Princess Alexandrina-Victoria')
- Fisher's Drawing Room Scrap Book, 1837. 'The Princess Victoria', to accompany a plate engraved by J. Cochran after Sir Geo. Hayter's painting.
- 'A Birthday Tribute. Addressed to H. R. H. the Princess Alexandrina Victoria, on Attaining Her Eighteenth Year'. 1837.
- Fisher's Drawing Room Scrap Book, 1838. 'To the Queen'. Frontispiece.
- Flowers of Loveliness, 1838. 'To Victoria'..
- Schloss's Bijou Almanack, 1838. 'Her Most Gracious Majesty, Queen Victoria'..

Queen Victoria is portrayed in Kim Newman's 1992 fantasy novel Anno Dracula as having married Vlad Tepes (Dracula), thereby making him Prince Consort and exerting control over the entire British Empire.

== Film ==
On screen, Victoria has been portrayed by:

- Rose Tapley in the silent short The Victoria Cross (1912)
- Louie Henri in the silent film Sixty Years a Queen (1913)
- Mrs. Henry Lytton in the silent film Disraeli (1916)
- Blanche Graham in the silent film Livingstone (1925), the story of David Livingstone
- Julia Faye in the silent film The Yankee Clipper (1927)
- Marion Drada in the silent film Balaclava (1928)
- Margaret Mann in Disraeli (1929)
- Madeleine Ozeray in the German French-language musical Court Waltzes (1933)
- Hanna Waag in the German film Waltz War (1933)
- Pamela Stanley in David Livingstone (1936) and Marigold (1938), based on the play by Charles Garvice, Allen Harker and F. Prior
- Fay Holden in The White Angel (1936), the story of Florence Nightingale
- Jenny Jugo in the German romantic comedy Victoria in Dover (1936)
- Yvette Pienne in the French comedy The Pearls of the Crown (1937)
- Viva Tattersall in Souls at Sea (1937)
- Anna Neagle in the biopics Victoria the Great (1937) and Sixty Glorious Years (1938)
- Beryl Mercer in The Little Princess (1939), based on the novel by Frances Hodgson Burnett, and The Story of Alexander Graham Bell (1939)
- Fay Compton in The Prime Minister (1941), about Benjamin Disraeli, and Journey to Midnight (1968)
- Evelyn Beresford in Buffalo Bill (1944) and the musical Annie Get Your Gun (1950)
- Pamela Brown in Alice in Wonderland (1949), in which she also played the Queen of Hearts
- Irene Dunne in The Mudlark (1950), based on the novel by Theodore Bonnet
- Helena Pickard in The Lady with a Lamp (1951), based on the play by Reginald Berkeley about Florence Nightingale
- Muriel Aked in The Story of Gilbert and Sullivan (1953)
- Sybil Thorndike in Melba (1953), the story of soprano Nellie Melba
- Romy Schneider in the Austrian/West German biopic Victoria in Dover (1954), remake of the 1936 film, which features a highly fictionalised story about Queen Victoria's ascension to the throne and marriage to Prince Albert
- Avis Bunnage in the comedy The Wrong Box (1966)
- Barbara Carroll in the Italian film Zorro alla corte d'Inghilterra (1969), in which Zorro visits the British Court
- Mollie Maureen in The Private Life of Sherlock Holmes (1970)
- Peter Sellers in The Great McGonagall (1974), a comic biopic of William McGonagall
- Susan Field in the spoof The Adventure of Sherlock Holmes' Smarter Brother (1975)
- John Dalby in the animated musical fantasy Stories from a Flying Trunk (1979), adapted from Hans Christian Andersen's tale The Flying Trunk
- Eve Brenner voices a mouse version of Victoria in The Great Mouse Detective (1986), adapted from Sir Arthur Conan Doyle's Sherlock Holmes series.
- Judi Dench in Mrs. Brown (1997), for which she was nominated for the Academy Award for Best Actress. Dench reprised the role in Victoria & Abdul (2017)
- Debra Beaumont in the Chinese film The Opium War (1997)
- Liz Moscrop in From Hell (2001), based on the graphic novel
- Gemma Jones in Shanghai Knights (2003)
- Tress MacNeille (voice) in the animated short Van Helsing: The London Assignment (2004)
- Kathy Bates in Around the World in 80 Days (2004), based on the novel by Jules Verne
- Zoe Street Howe in "Florence Nightingale" (2008)
- Emily Blunt in The Young Victoria (2009), with Michaela Brooks playing Victoria as a girl
- Imelda Staunton voices Victoria as the primary antagonist in The Pirates! In an Adventure with Scientists (2012)
- Judi Dench in Victoria & Abdul (2017).
- Gayle Rankin in The Greatest Showman (2017)
- Amanda Root in The Black Prince (2017).
- Pam Ferris in Holmes & Watson (2018).
- Jodhi May in The Warrior Queen of Jhansi (2019).
- Jessie Buckley in Dolittle (2020).
- Alexa Povah in The King's Man (2021).

She also makes appearances in Around the World in 80 Days (in which a newspaper detailing Phileas Fogg's progress is taken to the Queen, and what is presumably the royal hand is seen eagerly taking it up), in the 2004 anime movie Steamboy, inaugurating The Great Exhibition, and in the 2013 Oggy and the Cockroaches: The Movie. The 1941 Nazi film Ohm Krüger notoriously portrays her as a whisky-soaked drunk. Her daughter-in-law, the Princess of Wales, reads a letter from Victoria to London Hospital governors, showing her concern for John Merrick, in the 1980 film The Elephant Man.

== Television ==
On television, Victoria has been portrayed by:

- Helen Hayes in Victoria Regina (1951), an episode of the American series Robert Montgomery Presents based on the play by Housman
- Renée Asherson in the BBC drama series Happy and Glorious (1952)
- Judi Meredith in The Consort (1957), an episode of the American series Telephone Time
- Julie Harris in the American drama Victoria Regina (1961), based on Housman's play, for which Harris won an Emmy award
- Kate Reid in the American drama The Invincible Mr. Disraeli (1963)
- Patricia Routledge in the Granada Television series Victoria Regina (1964), also based on Housman's play
- Gladys Spencer in the BBC Play of the Month, Gordon of Khartoum (1966)
- Jane Connell in an episode of the American sitcom Bewitched titled "Aunt Clara's Victoria Victory" (1967)
- Christine Ozanne in an episode of the Yorkshire Television drama series The Flaxton Boys titled "1854: The Dog" (1969)
- Mollie Maureen in the BBC drama series The Edwardians (1972)
- Perlita Neilson and (as an old woman) Mavis Edwards in the BBC drama series Fall of Eagles (1974)
- Terry Jones in an episode of the BBC comedy series Monty Python's Flying Circus titled "Sex and Violence" (1969)
- Michael Palin in an episode of Monty Python's Flying Circus titled "Michael Ellis" (1974)
- Annette Crosbie in the ATV drama series Edward the Seventh (1975)
- Shirley Steedman in the British series East Lynne (1976), based on the novel by Mrs Henry Wood
- Rosemary Leach in the ATV drama series Disraeli (1978)
- Sheila Reid in the LWT drama series Lillie (1978), telling the story of Lillie Langtry
- Jacquelyn Hyde in the American comedy drama The Wild Wild West Revisited (1979)
- Jessica Spencer in an episode of the Granada Television drama series Cribb titled "The Hand That Rocks the Cradle" (1981)
- Marina McConnell in the Granada drama series Young Sherlock: The Mystery of the Manor House (1982)
- Lurene Tuttle in an episode of the American time travel series Voyagers! titled "Buffalo Bill & Annie Oakley Play the Palace" (1983)
- Zena Walker in the episode of the Yorkshire Television drama series Number 10 titled "Dizzy" (1983)
- Siobhan Redmond in ITV series Alfresco episode #1.2 (1983)
- Bronwen Mantel in the drama Barnum (1986)
- Erica Rogers in the miniseries Shaka Zulu (1986), based on the novel by Joshua Sinclair
- Miriam Margolyes in the BBC comedy Blackadder's Christmas Carol (1988) and later reprised in The Windsors on Channel 4
- Anna Massey in the miniseries Around the World in 80 Days (1989)
- Honora Burke in the British drama Hands of a Murderer (1990)
- Margaret Heale in the BBC drama series Rhodes (1996)
- Rhoda Lewis and (as an old woman) Avril Angers in the Granada miniseries Victoria & Albert (1997)
- Wendy Worthington in an episode of the Paramount sitcom The Secret Diary of Desmond Pfeiffer titled "Saving Mr. Lincoln" (1998)
- Patti Allen in the series The Secret Adventures of Jules Verne (2000)
- Victoria Hamilton in the miniseries Victoria and Albert (2001), in which Joyce Redman played her as an old woman
- Prunella Scales in the BBC drama Station Jim (2001) and in the BBC drama documentary Looking for Victoria (2003), in which Charlie Hayes played the young Victoria
- Janine Duvitski in the BBC drama The Young Visiters (2003)
- Doreen Mantle in the BBC drama series Shadow Play (2004)
- Tessa Pointing in the British drama documentary The First Black Britons (2005)
- Pauline Collins in the episode of the BBC series Doctor Who titled "Tooth and Claw" (2006)
- Robert Webb in a comedy sketch on the show That Mitchell and Webb Look (2006)
- Sarah Hadland (2009, 2015), Martha Howe-Douglas (2010–2013), Ellie White (2017–2018) and Jessica Ransom (2019–) in the British children's sketch show Horrible Histories (2009–)
- Elizabeth Leslie in "Her Majesty's Last Hope" (August 19, 2011), episode 11 of a web series extension of season 4 of the Canadian television period detective series Murdoch Mysteries: Murdoch Mysteries: The Curse of the Lost Pharaohs in which mummies attempt to kill Queen Victoria.
- Jenna Coleman in the ITV series Victoria (2016–2019)

Monty Python's Flying Circus portrays Queen Victoria as a slapstick prankster and includes a sketch in which she says "We are not amused" in German accented English. Another Monty Python sketch contains a footrace in which all the contestants are dressed as Queen Victoria.

In a series of sketches portraying the Phantom Raspberry Blower, the Two Ronnies dress an entire squad of policemen as Queen Victoria to act as body doubles for protection from the PRB.

In the 2006 series of Doctor Who, Queen Victoria appears in the episode "Tooth and Claw", where she is played by Pauline Collins. In the episode, set in 1879, she is threatened by a werewolf that wants to infect her and take control of her empire. It is suggested that a scratch from the werewolf is the source of haemophilia in many of her descendants. Rose Tyler makes a bet with the Doctor for £10 that she can get the Queen to say "We are not amused". At the episode's conclusion, she founds the Torchwood Institute, an integral feature of the spin-off series Torchwood, with various (fictional) speeches and proclamations by her available on the Torchwood Institute website. An image of Collins as Victoria was later displayed prominently in the 2017 episode "Empress of Mars", set during the later years of Victoria's reign (coincidentally, the episode guest-starred Ferdinand Kingsley, who at the time was co-starring with Jenna Coleman in the ITV series based on Victoria's life). In 2008, the Doctor's former companion Sarah Jane Smith, notes Her Majesty's awareness of aliens in The Sarah Jane Adventures episode, "Enemy of the Bane", to which her young apprentice Rani Chandra responds, "I'll bet she wasn't amused."

The BBC series Blackadder Goes Forth, set in World War I, alludes humorously to Queen Victoria's heritage. Captain Blackadder interrogates Captain Kevin Darling whom he suspects to be a German spy. Captain Darling claims that he is "as British as Queen Victoria", to which Captain Blackadder replies: "So your father's German, you're half German and you married a German?"

A recurring skit performed by the Canadian comedy duo Wayne and Shuster featured a man who flew into a rage upon hearing a pun, which causes an issue when he meets Victoria (played by different actresses over the years) with the idea of renaming a street "Victoria Mews" in her honour, to which she replies indigently, "I am not a Mews."

== Statues ==
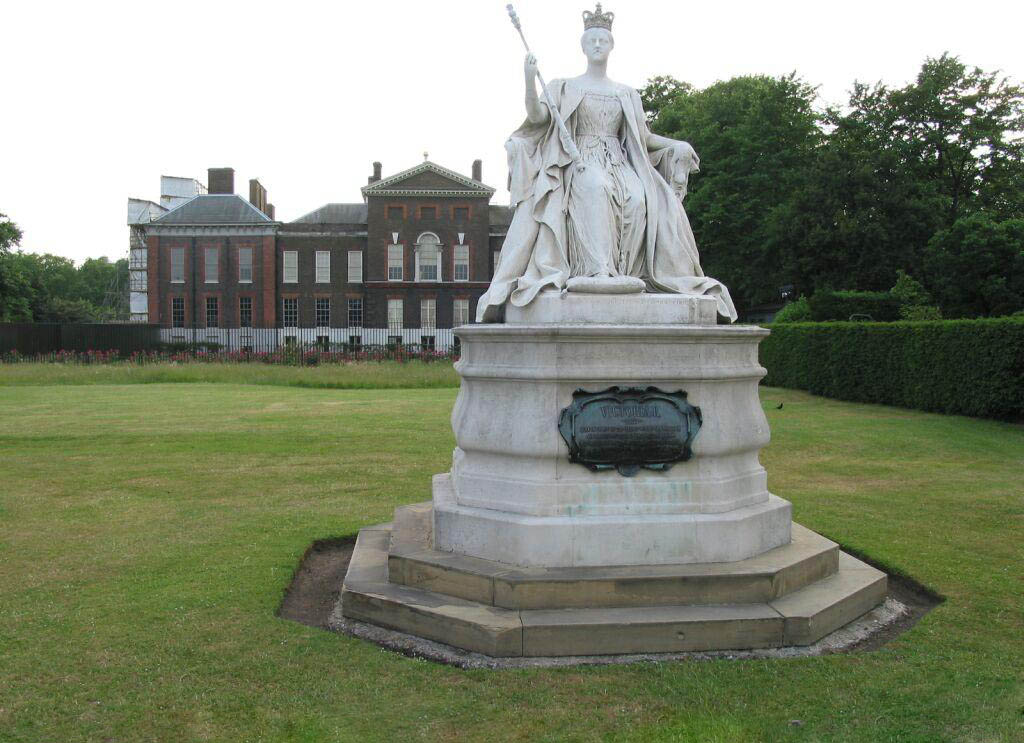
Princess Louise, Duchess of Argyll's statue of Queen Victoria at Kensington Palace

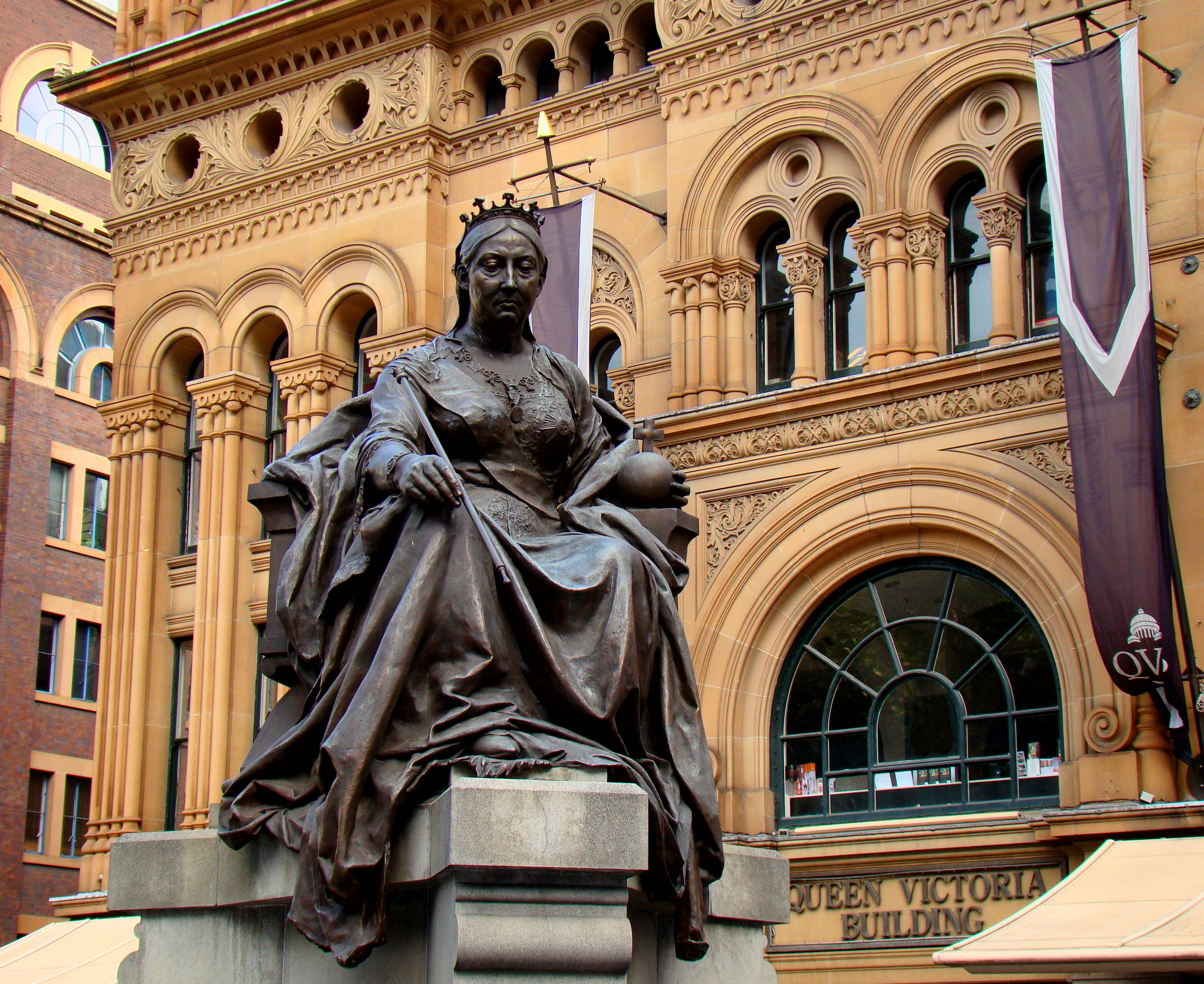
Statue of Queen Victoria in front of the Queen Victoria Building in Sydney, Australia

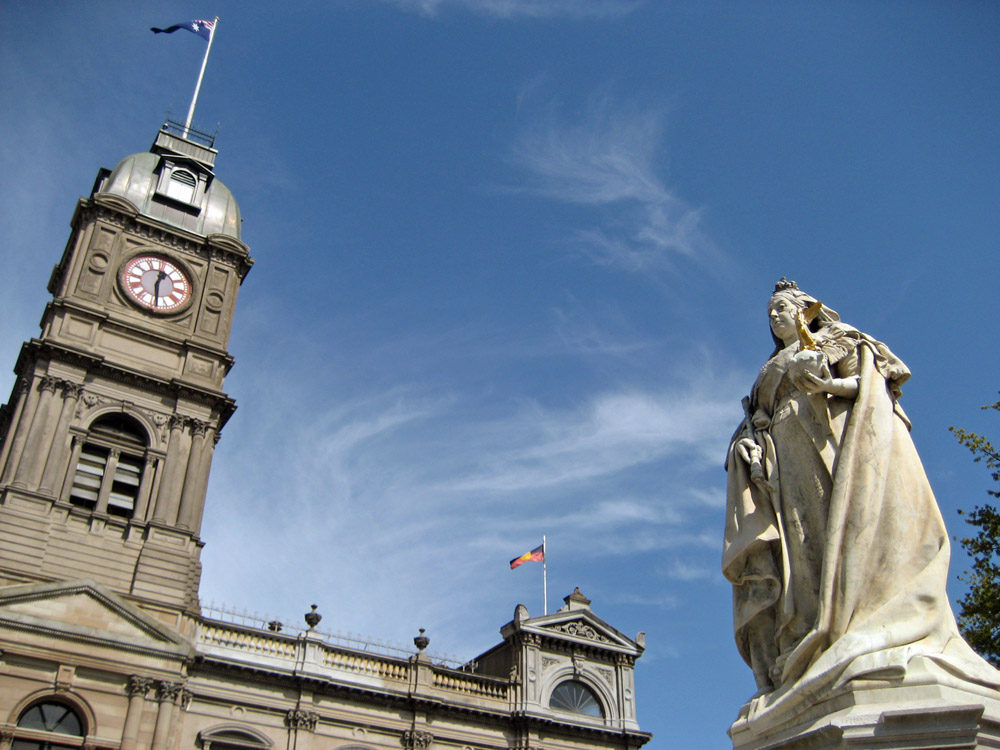
Queen Victoria Square and statue Sturt Street, Ballarat

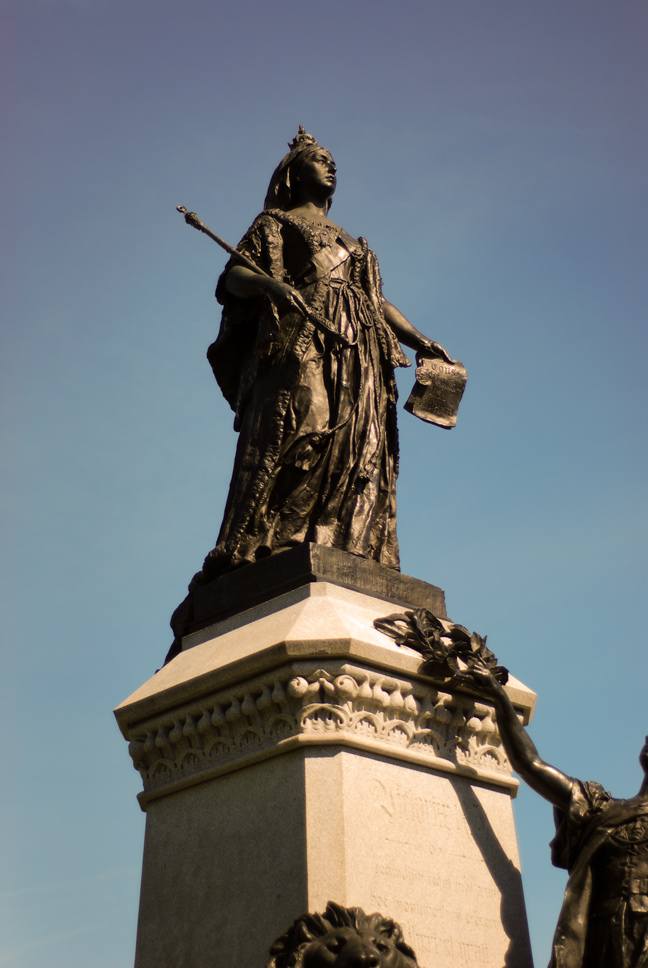
Statue of Victoria by Louis-Philippe Hébert on Parliament Hill. Ottawa, Canada.

One of Princess Louise, Duchess of Argyll's works as a sculptor is her marble statue of her mother at Kensington Palace, and a bronze version erected in front of the Royal Victoria College, McGill University in Montreal.

The prominent Victoria Memorial stands in Kolkata (Calcutta), and in Bangalore the statue of the Queen stands at the beginning of MG Road, one of the city's major roads. In the town of Cape Coast, Ghana, a bust of the Queen presides, rather forlornly, over a small park where goats graze around her. In Wellington, the capital of New Zealand, a statue toward the harbour from the centre of Kent and Cambridge Terraces. There is also a Queen Victoria Statue in the heart of Valletta, Malta's capital.

Victoria Jubilee Town Hall in Trivandrum is still one of city's most sought after theatres for live entertainment and is considered a prestigious landmark by both locals and tourists alike.

In Hong Kong, a statue of Queen Victoria is located on the east side of Victoria Park in Causeway Bay, Hong Kong Island. The statue once sat in Statue Square in Central but was removed and sent to Tokyo to be destroyed at the time of Japanese occupation of the territory, during World War II. With Japan's defeat and subsequent retreat in 1945, The United Kingdom recovered Hong Kong, and the statue was retrieved and placed in the park.

In Pietermaritzburg, capital of the South African province of KwaZulu Natal, formerly the British colony of Natal before formation of the Union of South Africa, there is a statue of Victoria in front of the provincial legislature building, the former parliament building of the colony of Natal. There is also a statue of Queen Victoria in front of the South African Parliament.

Most of the large cities in Australia that prospered during the Victorian era feature prominent statues of Queen Victoria. Sydney, the capital city of New South Wales has several. There is one statue (re-sited from the forecourt of the Irish Parliament building in Dublin) dominating the southern entrance to the Queen Victoria Building that was named in her honour in 1898. Another Sydney statue of Queen Victoria stands in the forecourt of the Federal Court of Australia building on Macquarie Street, looking across the road to a statue of her husband, inscribed "Albert the Good". In Melbourne, the capital of Victoria, the Queen Victoria Gardens named after her also features a large memorial statue in marble and granite. In Perth, capital city of Western Australia a marble statue stands in King's Park overlooking the city. In Adelaide, capital city of the state of South Australia, the Queen Victoria Square, named after her also has a large statue of her. In Brisbane, capital city of the state of Queensland, there is a statue of her in Queens Square, also named for her;. Ballarat, a boomtown in Victoria has a statue of Queen Victoria in the main street directly opposite its town hall. A small bust of the Queen is in the Queen Victoria Gardens in Burnt Pine, the largest town in the Australian territory of Norfolk Island.

Statues erected to Victoria are common in Canada, where her reign included the original confederation of the country and the addition of three more provinces and two territories. A bas-relief image of Victoria is on the wall of the entrance to the Canadian Parliament, and her statue is in the Parliamentary library as well as on the grounds.

== Musical theatre ==
In 1972 Charles Strouse wrote a musical, I and Albert, which was presented in the West End at the Piccadilly Theatre on 6 November 1972. The musical was not a success and did not transfer as planned to Broadway. It remains notable chiefly as Sarah Brightman's stage debut.

== Other ==
English rock band The Kinks honour Queen Victoria and her empire in their 1969 song "Victoria". The song has since been covered by English rock band The Kooks, English post-punk band The Fall, American alternative rock band Cracker, and American rock band Sonic Youth. Both The Kinks' and The Fall's versions were UK Top 40 hits.

Canadian singer Leonard Cohen refers to her in a mostly non-factual way in his 1964 poem "Queen Victoria and Me", and again in the 1972 song "Queen Victoria" (based on the poem). The song was later covered by Welsh musician John Cale.

In 2006, the Comics Sherpa online comic service started carrying a comic strip titled The New Adventures of Queen Victoria using cut-out photographs and portraits of the Queen and others.

In the Japanese anime and manga series Kuroshitsuji (Black Butler), she appears as Ciel Phantomhive's primary boss.

Queen Victoria's reign features in the 2003 Paradox Interactive grand strategy game, Victoria: An Empire Under the Sun. In this game a player guides a country through colonisation, the Industrial Revolution, warfare and various historic events.

She makes an appearance in the 2015 action-adventure video game Assassin's Creed: Syndicate developed by Ubisoft Quebec.

Queen Victoria leads the English civilization in the 2016 4X video game Civilization VI developed by Firaxis Games.

Queen Victoria is revealed to be watching the climactic trial in the video game The Great Ace Attorney 2: Resolve, and uses her authority to strip the main villain of his position as chief justice. Rather than appearing in person, another character reads her proclamation to the court.
