= Sisters of Fortune =

Sisters of Fortune may refer to:

- Sisters of Fortune, 2007 novel by Frances McNeil
- Sisters of Fortune, America’s Caton Sisters at Home and Abroad, 2010 history book by Jehanne Wake
