= Happy and Glorious =

Happy and Glorious may refer to:

- Happy and Glorious (TV series), a 1952 British TV drama series about Queen Victoria and Prince Albert
- Happy and Glorious (film), a short film starring Queen Elizabeth II and Daniel Craig as James Bond shown as part of the 2012 Olympic Games opening ceremony
- Happy and Glorious, a 2015 comedy tour by Michael McIntyre
