= Princess Louise Hospital =

- Imperial College Healthcare NHS Trust
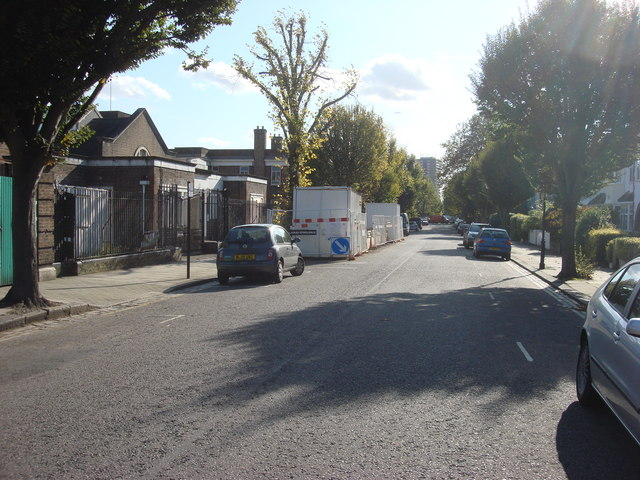
- Princess Louise Hospital (on the left)

- Location within Kensington and Chelsea

Geography
- Location: Kensington, London
- Coordinates: 51.5203°N 0.2221°W

Organisation
- Care system: NHS England
- Type: Specialist

Services
- Speciality: Care for the elderly

History
- Founded: 1815
- Closed: 2006

The Princess Louise Hospital was a health facility in Kensington, London. It was managed by the Imperial College Healthcare NHS Trust.

== History ==
The hospital has its origins in the Kensington Dispensary in Holland Street which opened in 1815 and moved to Church Street in 1849. The foundation stone for a new purpose-built hospital focussing on the treatment of children was laid by Princess Louise in St Quintin Avenue in 1926 and the new facility was officially opened by King George V and Queen Mary as the Princess Louise Hospital for Children in 1928. It joined the National Health Service in 1948 and was converted for geriatric use in 1970. After services transferred to St Charles' Hospital, the Princess Louise Hospital closed in 2006. The site was sold to the Clarendon Group and it was subsequently redeveloped for residential use.
