= Jehanne Wake =

British biographer, historian and archivist

- Occupations: Archivist, Historian, Biographer
- Writing career
- Language: English
- Notable works: Princess Louise: Queen Victoria’s Unconventional Daughter (1988), Sisters of Fortune, America’s Caton Sisters at Home and Abroad (2010)

Jehanne Deirdre Alexandra Wake (née Williams) is a British biographer, historian and archivist. She has written critically acclaimed biographies of Princess Louise, the sixth child of Queen Victoria, and of the four early American Caton sisters known as "the American graces", amongst other books.

== Life ==
Jehanne Wake had an international upbringing before she studied Philosophy, Politics and Economics (PPE) at Oxford University. She was one of the first generation of female graduate trainee investment bankers in the City of London. She is married and lives with her family in West London.

== Works ==
Wake is the author of several non-fiction books and corporate histories. She has also contributed to BBC television and radio programmes as a talking head. She appeared on Reputations: Florence Nightingale (BBC) and Reputations: Prince Albert (BBC). Her books to date include:

Her latest book, Sisters of Fortune, published in August 2010, is a biography of four American heiresses, Marianne, Bess, Louisa and Emily Caton. They were granddaughters of Charles Carroll of Carrollton of Maryland, the only Roman Catholic and the longest-surviving signer of the American Declaration of Independence. The eldest three sisters travelled to Britain shortly after the Napoleonic Wars and were among the earliest American women to enter British society. Louisa Caton was the first American to marry a duke, marrying Francis D'Arcy-Osborne, 7th Duke of Leeds on 24 April 1828. Emily, the only daughter to stay in the United States, married John MacTavish, a Scots-Canadian fur trade entrepreneur and British Consul to Baltimore, Maryland.

== Bibliography ==
- Princess Louise: Queen Victoria’s Unconventional Daughter, HarperCollins, 1988, ISBN 9780002170765
- Kleinwort, Benson: The History of Two Families in Banking. Oxford University Press. 1997. ISBN 978-0-19-828299-0.
- Thwaites: The Life and Times of Daniel Thwaites Brewery, Scotforth Books, 2007, ISBN 9781904244462
- Beyond The Banking Hall, A History of the Kleinwort Family, Sutton Publishing, 2000, OCLC 52713165
- Sisters of Fortune: America's Caton Sisters at Home and Abroad. Simon & Schuster. 28 February 2012. ISBN 978-1-4516-0763-5.
