= Mahatma Ayyankali Hall =

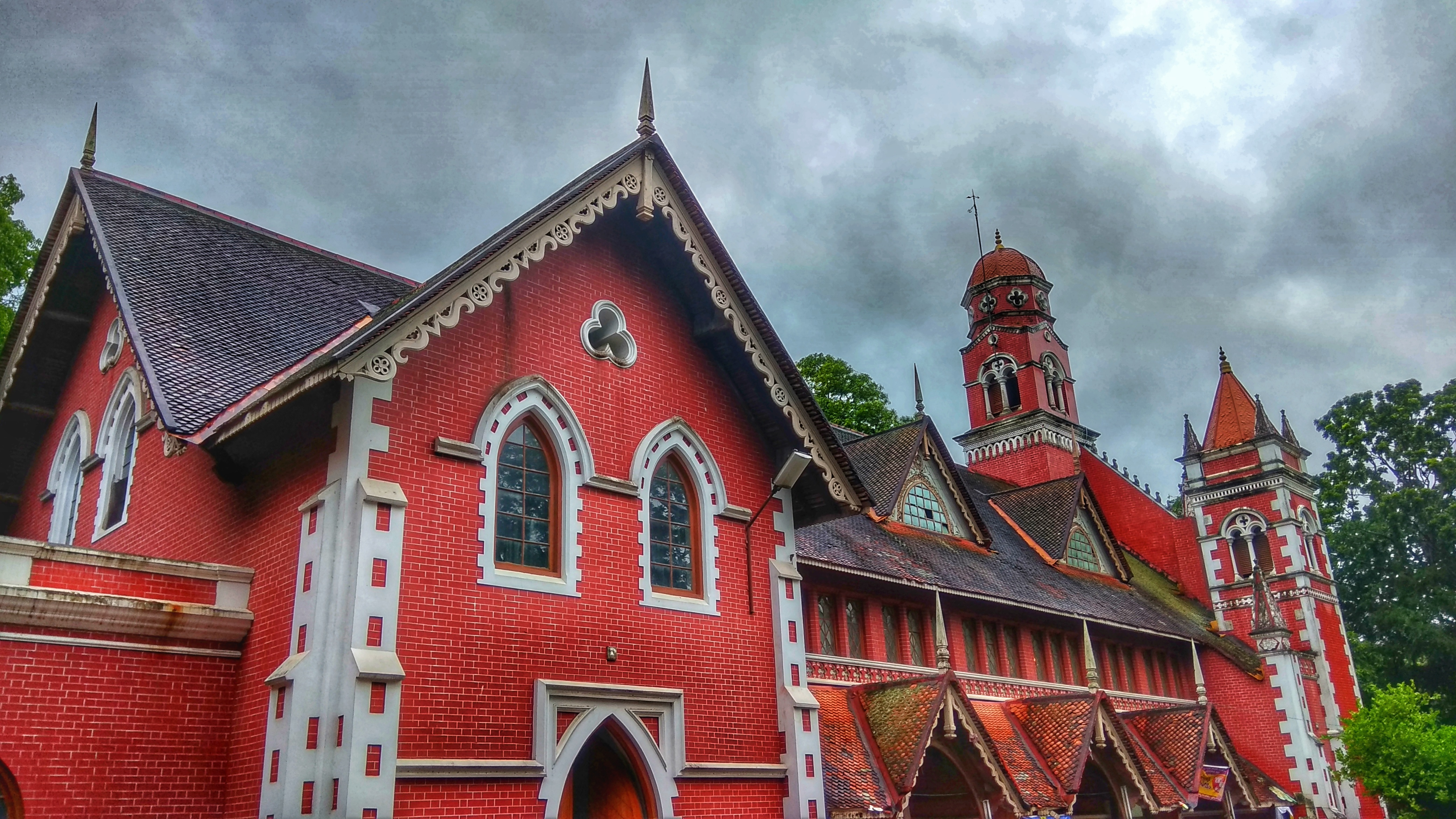
Mahatma Ayyankali Hall in Thiruvananthapuram

Mahatma Ayyankali Hall, originally Victoria Jubilee Town Hall (VJT Hall), also known by its former name "VJT Hall", is a town hall in Thiruvananthapuram, Kerala, India. It had originally been built as a gift from the British Empire to Sri Moolam Thirunal Rama Varma, the then Maharaja of Travancore, to commemorate the 50th anniversary of the coronation of Queen Victoria, in 1896.

In 2019, it was renamed by the current Chief Minister of Kerala Pinarayi Vijayan to honor the social reformer Ayyankali Renaming the building resulted in criticism from some historians who felt there would be a more appropriate way to honor Ayyankali. Nevertheless, Dalit activists, such as Sunny Kapikad, supported the renaming of the hall, as they feel Ayyankali has not been honored in a respectful manner and renaming the hall would give due respect to both Ayyankali and the Dalit community as a whole.

Today, this hall has retained its architectural and cultural richness and is one of the most sought-after centres for exhibitions and cultural get-togethers in Thiruvananthapuram.
