= Statue of Queen Victoria, Kensington Palace =

Statue outside Kensington Palace, London

Coordinates: 51°30′19″N 0°11′10″W

Statue of Queen Victoria
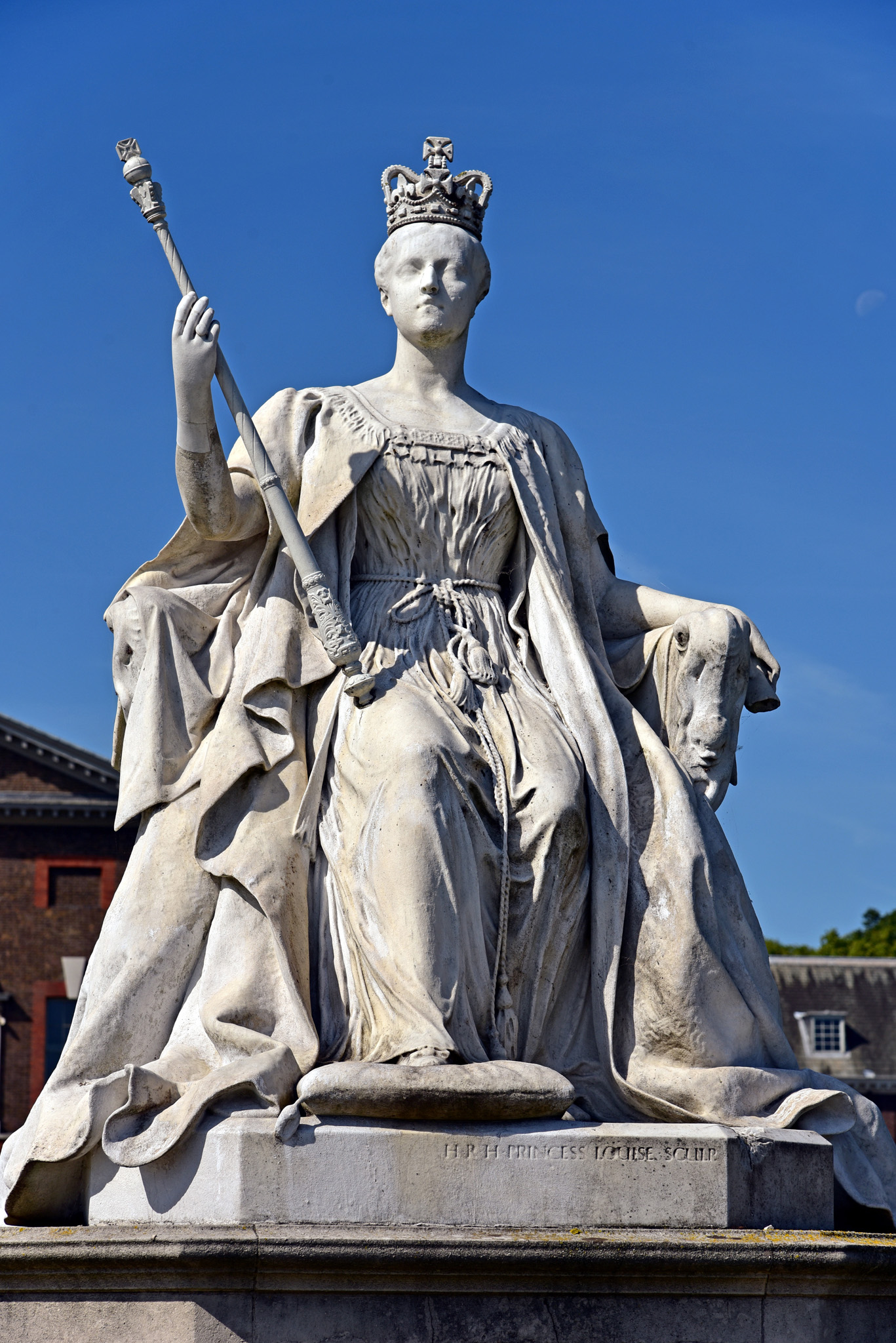
- Interactive map of Statue of Queen Victoria
- Location: Near Kensington Palace, London, England
- Designer: Princess Louise, Duchess of Argyll
- Type: Statue
- Material: White marble (statue); Portland stone (base)
- Dedicated date: 28 June 1893
- Dedicated to: Queen Victoria

A Statue of Queen Victoria stands near Kensington Palace. It was sculpted by Victoria's fourth daughter Princess Louise, Duchess of Argyll and erected in 1893. The statue was made from white marble on a Portland stone base. It depicts Victoria aged 18, seated in her coronation robes, resembling the painting of Victoria at her coronation by Sir George Hayter. The statue received a Grade II listing in 1969.

Victoria was born in Kensington Palace in May 1819, and spent most of her early life there until she ascended to the throne in 1837. The statue was made to celebrate the Golden Jubilee of Queen Victoria in 1887 but took some years to complete. It was commissioned by the Kensington Golden Jubilee Memorial Executive Committee, who sought design proposals. Princess Louise was reluctant to take up a commission to sculpt her mother, but was persuaded to make a model by her friend, the artist Lawrence Alma-Tadema. She submitted her entry anonymously, and it was selected by the judging panel. Princess Louise was herself resident at Kensington Palace, and she sculpted the statue at her studio there (although some press reports suggested it was made by her tutor Sir Joseph Edgar Boehm). The completed sculpture was unveiled by Queen Victoria on 28 June 1893.

The statue suffered bomb damage during the Second World War, with shrapnel removing its nose in 1945. The damaged nose was replaced before the accession of Queen Elizabeth II in 1952, and the nose was replaced a second time for the Golden Jubilee of Elizabeth II in 2002.

A bronze casting of the statue stands in front of the Royal Victoria College, Montreal, now the Strathcona Music Building of McGill University. The replica was commissioned by Donald Smith, 1st Baron Strathcona and Mount Royal, founder of Royal Victoria College, and unveiled in 1900 by Gilbert Elliot-Murray-Kynynmound, 4th Earl of Minto, then Governor General of Canada.

== Gallery ==
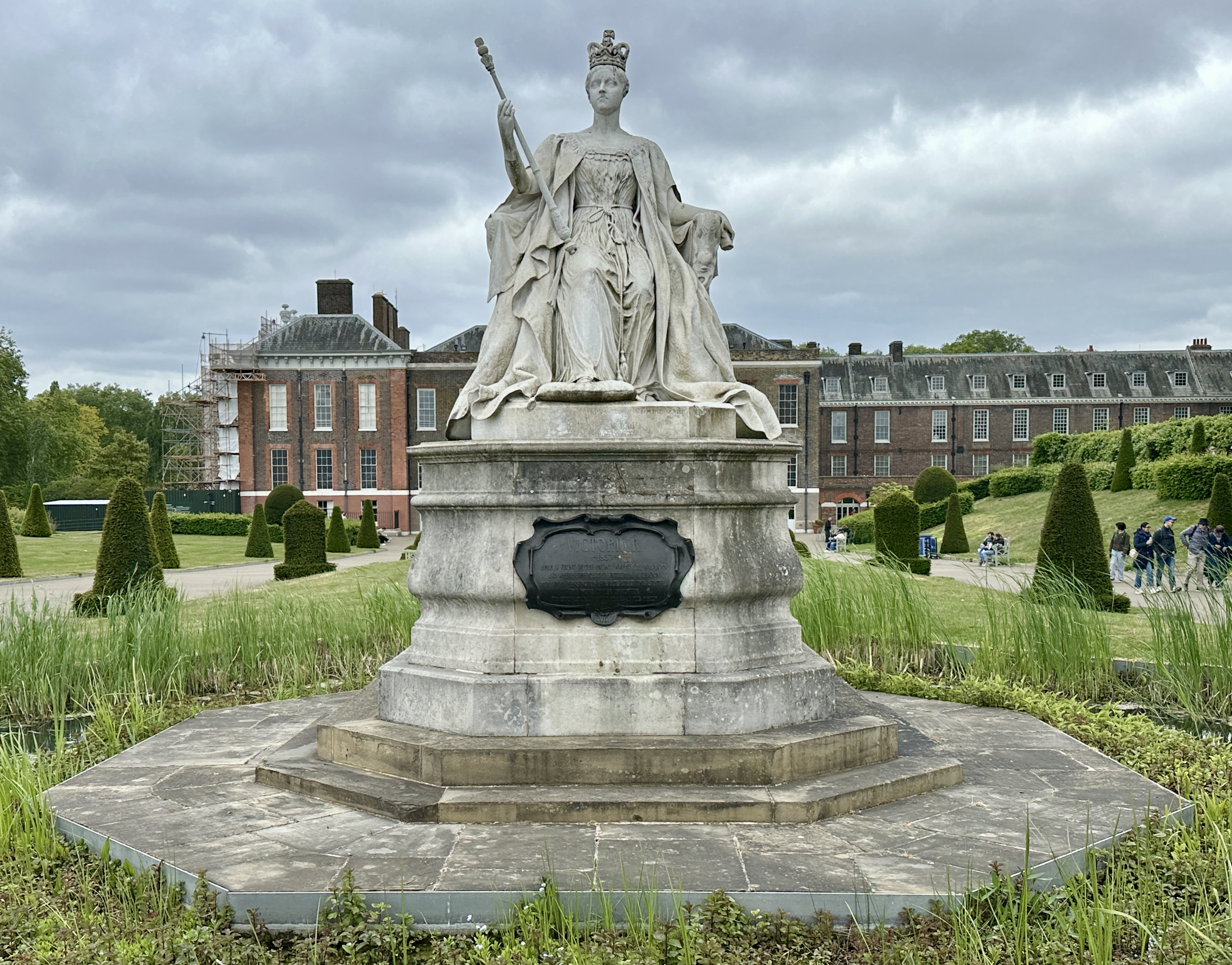
Statue at Kensington Palace, London.

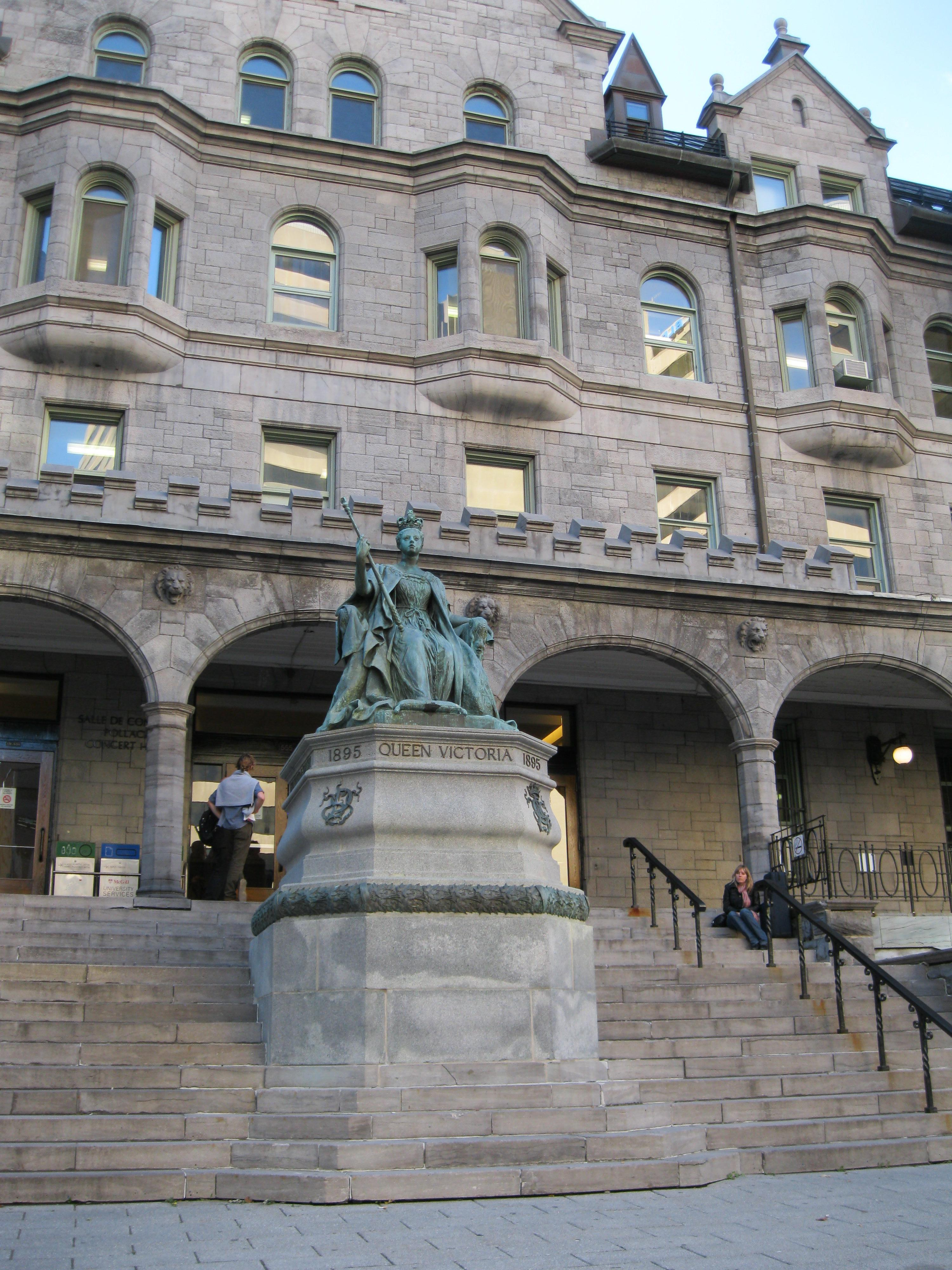
Statue at Royal Victoria College, Montreal.
