= Princess Louise, Duchess of Argyll =

British princess (1848–1939)

Princess Louise
- Duchess of Argyll (more)
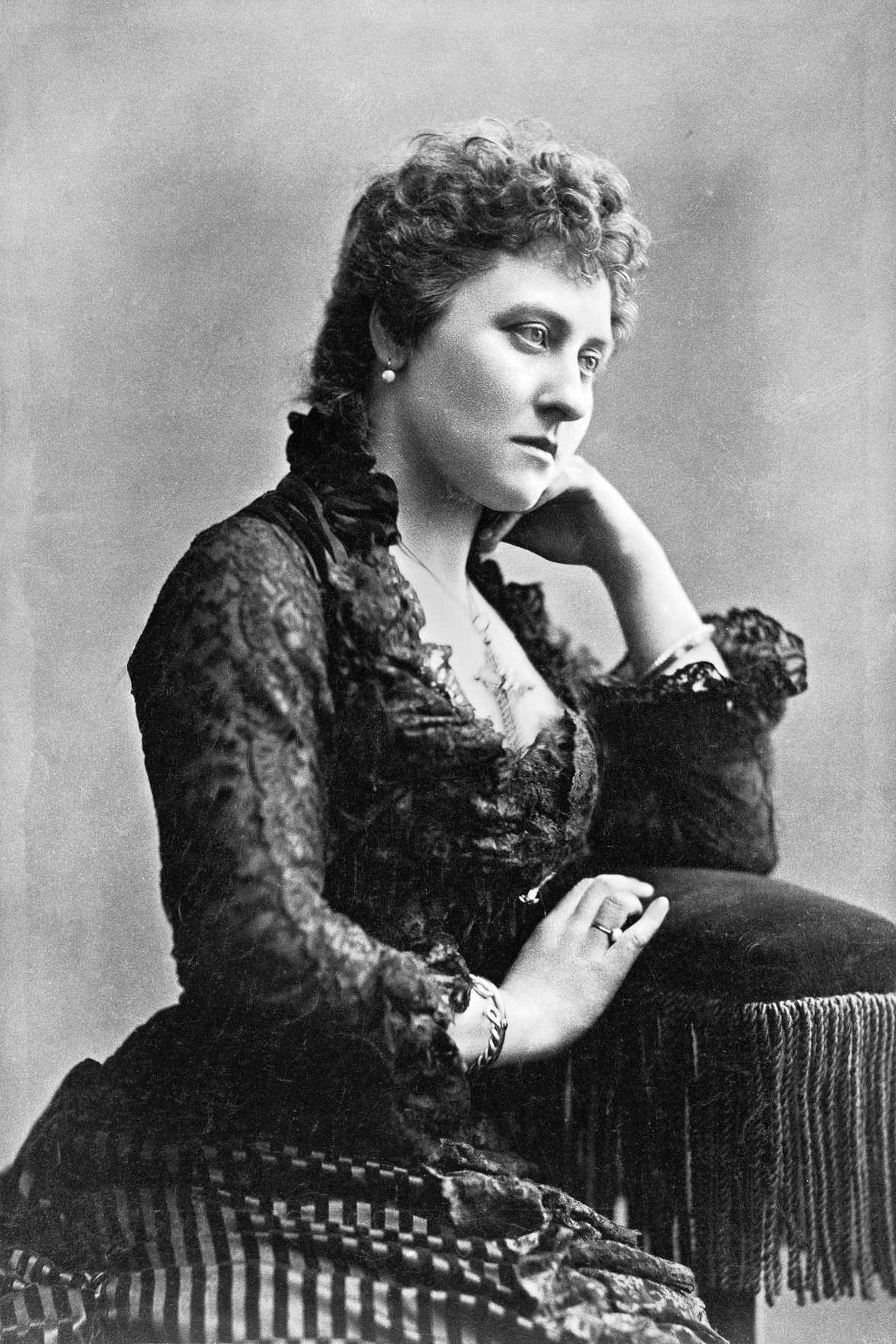
- Louise in 1881
- Born: 18 March 1848; Buckingham Palace, London, United Kingdom
- Died: 3 December 1939 (aged 91); Kensington Palace, London, United Kingdom
- Burial: 12 December 1939; Royal Vault, St George's Chapel, Windsor Castle; 13 March 1940; Royal Burial Ground, Frogmore
- Spouse: John Campbell, 9th Duke of Argyll (m. 1871; died 1914)
Names
- Louisa Caroline Alberta
- House: Saxe-Coburg and Gotha (until 1917); Windsor (from 1917)
- Father: Prince Albert of Saxe-Coburg and Gotha
- Mother: Queen Victoria

Viceregal consort of Canada
- In role 25 November 1878 – 23 October 1883
- Monarch: Victoria
- Governor General: John Campbell, Marquess of Lorne
- Preceded by: Hariot Rowan-Hamilton
- Succeeded by: Lady Maud Hamilton

Princess Louise, Duchess of Argyll (Louisa Caroline Alberta; 18 March 1848 – 3 December 1939), was the sixth child and fourth daughter of Queen Victoria and Prince Albert.

In her public life, she was a strong proponent of the arts and higher education and of the feminist cause. She was an influential supporter of the Edinburgh College of Domestic Science, the forerunner to Queen Margaret University, becoming the institution's first Patron in 1891 until 1939. Her early life was spent moving among the various royal residences in the company of her family. When her father died in December 1861, the court went into a long period of mourning, to which with time Louise became unsympathetic. She was an able sculptor and artist, and several of her sculptures remain today. She was also a supporter of the feminist movement, corresponding with Josephine Butler, and visiting Elizabeth Garrett.

Before her marriage, Louise served as an unofficial secretary to the Queen from 1866 to 1871. The question of Louise's marriage was discussed in the late 1860s. Suitors from the royal houses of Prussia and Denmark were suggested, but Victoria did not want her to marry a foreign prince, and therefore suggested a high-ranking member of the British aristocracy. Despite opposition from members of the royal family, Louise fell in love with John Campbell, Marquess of Lorne, the heir of the Duke of Argyll. Victoria consented to the marriage, which took place on 21 March 1871. After a happy beginning, the couple drifted apart, possibly because of their childlessness and the Queen's constraints on their activities.

In 1878, Lorne was appointed Governor General of Canada, a post he held from 1878 to 1884. Louise was viceregal consort, starting a lasting interest in Canada. Her names were used to name many features in Canada, including the Louise Bridge in Winnipeg, Lake Louise and the province of Alberta. Following her mother's death in 1901, she entered the social circle established by her elder brother, the new king, Edward VII. Louise's marriage with Lorne survived thanks to long periods of separation; they reconciled in 1911, and Louise was devastated by Lorne's death in 1914. After the First World War, she began to retire from public life, undertaking few public duties outside Kensington Palace, where she died at the age of 91.

== Early life ==
Louise was born at 8:00 am on 18 March 1848 at Buckingham Palace, London. She was the fourth daughter and sixth child of the reigning British monarch, Queen Victoria, and her husband, Prince Albert of Saxe-Coburg and Gotha. Her birth coincided with a revolutionary wave that swept across Europe, prompting the queen to remark that Louise would turn out to be "something peculiar".

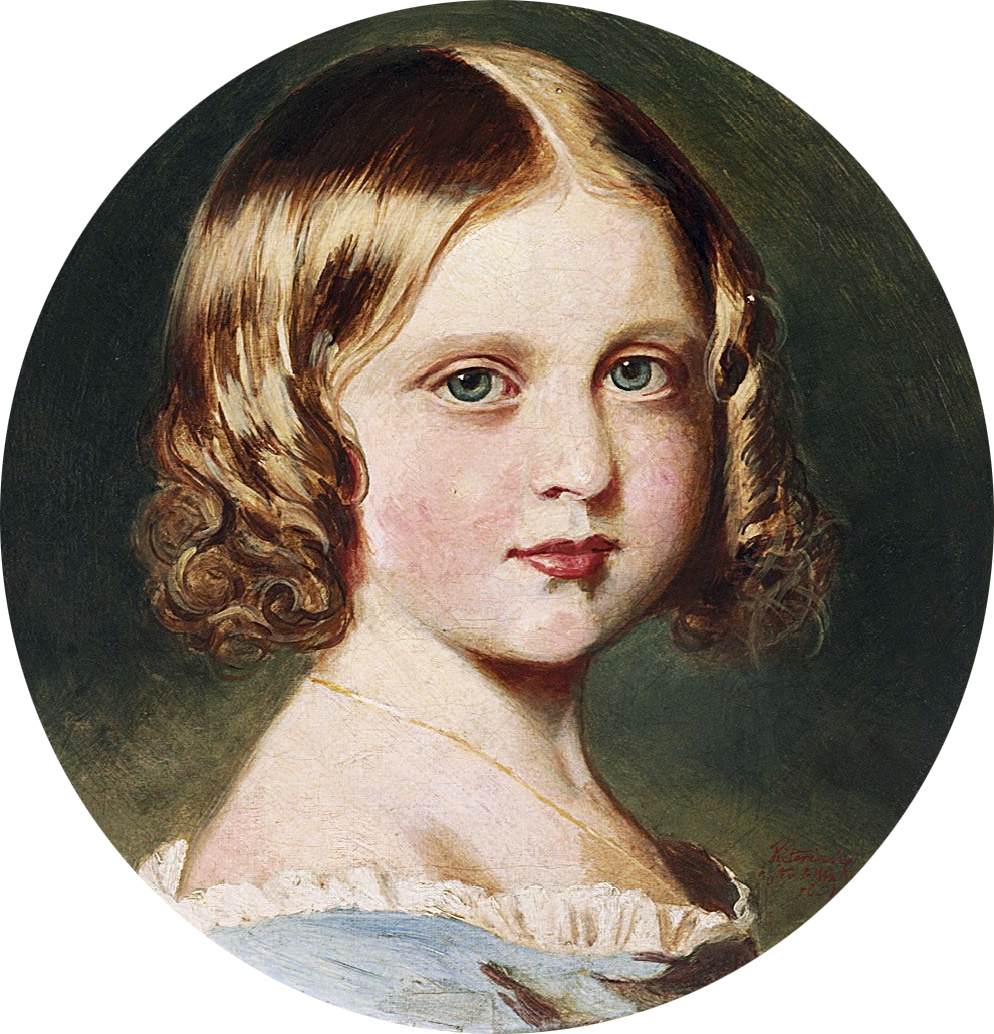
Queen Victoria painted a portrait of Louise after an original by Franz Xaver Winterhalter

Albert and Victoria chose the names Louisa Caroline Alberta. She was baptised on 13 May in the private chapel at Buckingham Palace by John Bird Sumner, the Archbishop of Canterbury. Though she was christened Louisa at the service, she was invariably known as Louise throughout her life. Her godparents were Duke Gustav Wilhelm of Mecklenburg-Schwerin (her paternal great-great-uncle, for whom Prince Albert stood proxy); the Duchess of Saxe-Meiningen (for whom her great-aunt Queen Adelaide stood proxy); and the Hereditary Grand Duchess of Mecklenburg-Strelitz (her first cousin once-removed, for whom the Duchess of Cambridge stood proxy). During the ceremony, the Duchess of Gloucester, one of the few children of King George III who were still alive, forgot where she was, and suddenly got up in the middle of the service and knelt at the queen's feet, much to the queen's horror.

Like her siblings, Louise was brought up with the strict programme of education devised by her father, Prince Albert, and his friend and confidant, Baron Stockmar. The young children were taught practical tasks, such as cooking, farming, household chores and carpentry.

From her early years, Louise was a talented and intelligent child, and her artistic skills were quickly recognised. On his visit to Osborne House in 1863, Hallam Tennyson, the son of the poet Alfred, Lord Tennyson, remarked that Louise could "draw beautifully". Because of her royal rank, an artistic career was not considered. However, the queen first allowed her to attend art school under the tutelage of the sculptor Mary Thornycroft, and later (1863) allowed her to study at the National Art Training School, now The Royal College of Art. Louise also became an able dancer, and Victoria wrote, after a dance, that Louise "danced the sword dance with more verve and accuracy than any of her sisters". Her wit and intelligence made her a favourite with her father, with her inquisitive nature earning her the nickname "Little Miss Why" from other members of the royal family.

== Secretary ==
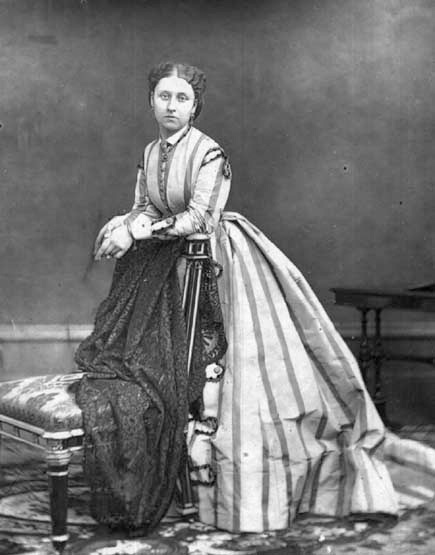
Louise in November 1866

Louise's father, Prince Albert, died at Windsor on 14 December 1861. The queen was devastated, and ordered her household to move from Windsor to Osborne House on the Isle of Wight. The atmosphere of the royal court became gloomy and morbid in the wake of the prince's death, and entertainments became dry and dull. Louise quickly became dissatisfied with her mother's prolonged mourning. For her seventeenth birthday in 1865, Louise requested the ballroom to be opened for a debutante dance, the like of which had not been performed since Prince Albert's death. Her request was refused, and her boredom with the mundane routine of travelling between the different royal residences at set times irritated her mother, who considered Louise to be indiscreet and argumentative.

The queen comforted herself by rigidly continuing with Prince Albert's plans for their children. Princess Alice was married to Prince Louis, the future Grand Duke of Hesse, at Osborne House on 1 July 1862. In 1863, Edward, the Prince of Wales, married Princess Alexandra of Denmark. The queen made it a tradition that the eldest unmarried daughter become her unofficial secretary, a position which Louise filled in 1866 following the marriage of her elder sister Helena, despite the queen's concern that she was indiscreet.

Louise, however, proved to be good at the job: Victoria wrote shortly afterwards: "She is (and who would some years ago have thought it?) a clever dear girl with a fine strong character, unselfish and affectionate." However, when Louise fell in love with her brother Leopold's tutor, the Reverend Robinson Duckworth (14 years her senior), between 1866 and 1870, the queen reacted by dismissing Duckworth in 1870. He later became Canon of Westminster Abbey.

Louise was bored at court, and by fulfilling her duties, which were little more than minor secretarial tasks, such as writing letters on the queen's behalf; dealing with political correspondence; and providing the queen with company, she had more responsibilities. She also undertook her share of public and philanthropic duties, for example inaugurating the new North Eastern Hospital for Children in 1867 and launching the ship HMS Druid in 1869.

== Marriage ==
=== Suitors ===
As a daughter of the queen, Louise was a desirable bride; more so as she is regarded as the queen's most beautiful daughter by both contemporary and modern biographers. However, she was accused by the press, without substantiation, of romantic affairs. This, coupled with her liberalism and feminism, prompted the queen to find her a husband. The choice had to suit Victoria as well as Louise, and the queen insisted that her daughter's husband should live near her, a promise which had also been extracted from the husband of Helena, Louise's sister. Various suitors were proposed by the leading royal houses of Europe: Princess Alexandra proposed her brother, the Crown Prince of Denmark, but the queen was strongly opposed to another Danish marriage that could antagonise Prussia at a time of diplomatic tension over the Schleswig-Holstein question. Victoria, Louise's eldest sister, proposed the tall and rich Prince Albert of Prussia, but Queen Victoria disapproved of another Prussian marriage that would have been unpopular in England. Prince Albert was also reluctant to settle in England as required. William, Prince of Orange, was also considered a suitor, but because of his extravagant lifestyle in Paris, where he lived openly with a lover, the queen quickly vetoed the idea.

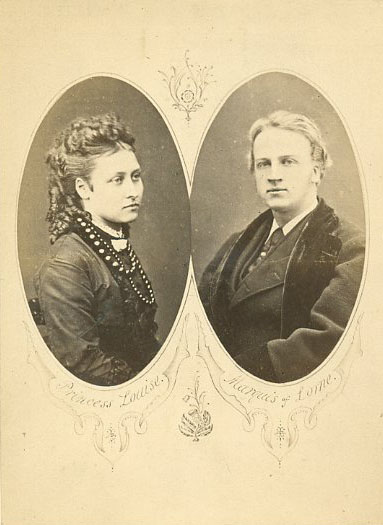
Louise and Lorne's engagement photo (W & D Downey, 1870)

Louise viewed marriage to any prince as undesirable, and announced that she wished to marry John Campbell, Marquess of Lorne, heir to the Dukedom of Argyll. No marriage between a daughter of a monarch and a British subject had been given official recognition since 1515, when Charles Brandon, 1st Duke of Suffolk, married King Henry VIII's sister Mary. Louise's eldest brother, the Prince of Wales, was strongly opposed to a marriage with a non-mediatized noble. Furthermore, Lorne's father, George Campbell, was an ardent supporter of William Ewart Gladstone, and the Prince of Wales was worried that he would drag the royal family into political disputes. Nevertheless, the opposition was crushed by the queen, who wrote to the Prince of Wales in 1869:

That which you object to [that Louise should marry a subject] I feel certain will be for Louise's happiness and for the peace and quiet of the family ... Times have changed; great foreign alliances are looked on as causes of trouble and anxiety, and are of no good. What could be more painful than the position in which our family were placed during the wars with Denmark, and between Prussia and Austria? ... You may not be aware, as I am, with what dislike the marriages of Princesses of the Royal Family with small German Princes (German beggars as they most insultingly were called) ... As to position, I see no difficulty whatever; Louise remains what she is, and her husband keeps his rank ... only being treated in the family as a relation when we are together ...

The queen averred that Louise's marriage to a subject would bring "new blood" into the family, while all European princes were related to each other. She was convinced that this would strengthen the royal family morally and physically.

=== Engagement and wedding ===
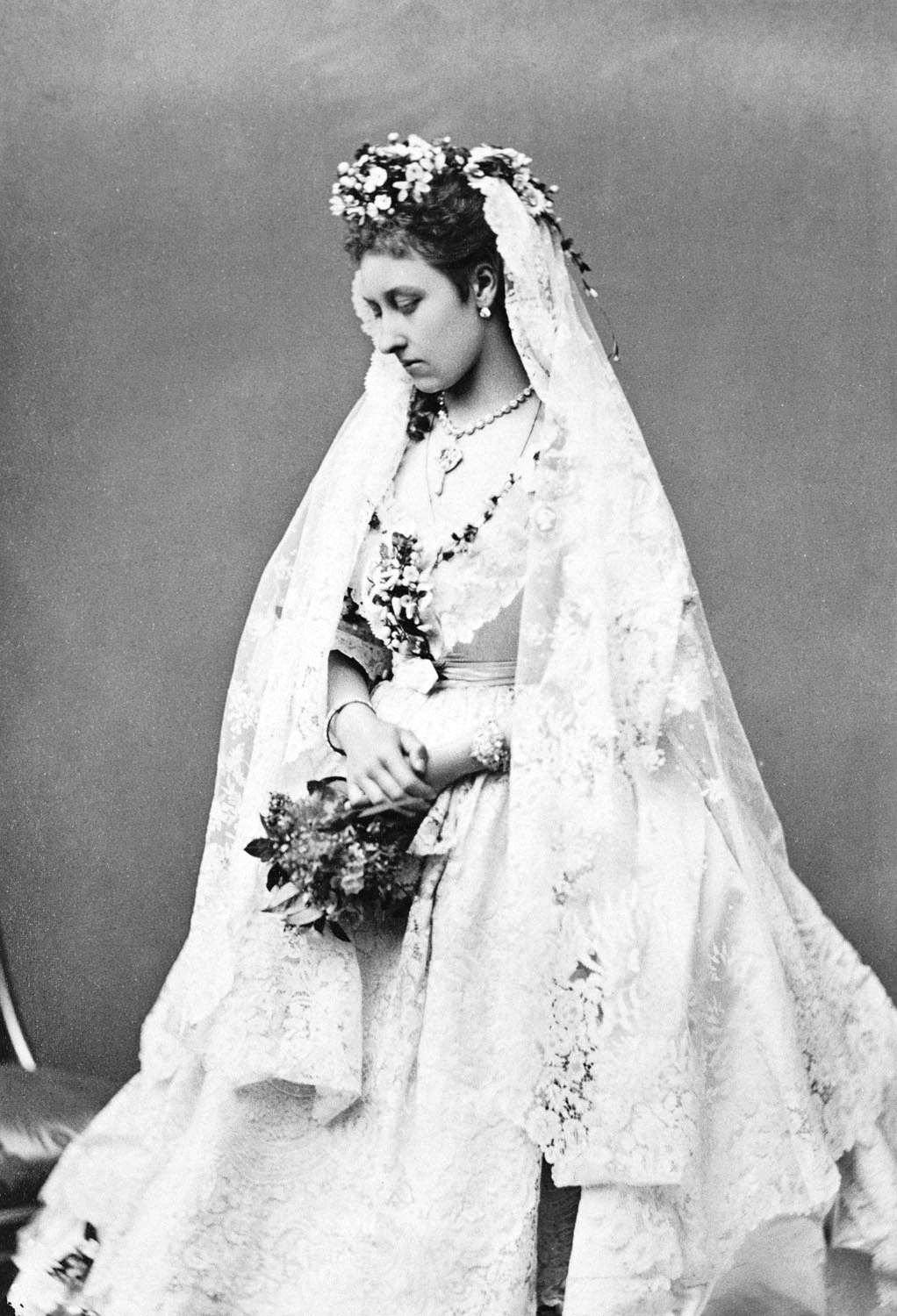
Louise in her wedding dress

Louise became engaged to the Marquess of Lorne on 3 October 1870 while they were visiting Balmoral. Lorne was invited to Balmoral Castle in Scotland, and accompanied Louise, the Lord Chancellor, Lord Hatherley and Queen Victoria's lady-in-waiting Lady Ely on a drive. Later that day, Louise returned and announced to the queen that Lorne had "spoken of his devotion" to Louise, and she accepted his proposal in the knowledge of the queen's approval. The Queen later gave Lady Ely a bracelet to mark the occasion.

The Queen found it difficult to let go of her daughter, confiding in her journal that she "felt painfully the thought of losing her". The new breach in royal tradition caused surprise, especially in Germany, and Queen Victoria wrote to the Queen of Prussia that princes of small impoverished German houses were "very unpopular" in Britain and that Lord Lorne, a "person of distinction at home" with "an independent fortune" was "really no lower in rank than minor German Royalty".

Victoria settled an annuity on Louise shortly before her marriage. The ceremony was conducted at St George's Chapel at Windsor Castle on 21 March 1871, and the crowd outside was so large that, for the first time, policemen had to form chain barriers to keep control. Louise wore a wedding veil of Honiton lace that she designed herself, and was escorted into the chapel by her mother, and her two eldest brothers, the Prince of Wales and the Duke of Edinburgh. On this occasion, the usually severe black of the queen's mourning dress was relieved by the crimson rubies and blues of the Garter star. Following the ceremony, the queen kissed Louise, and Lorne – now a member of the royal family, but still a subject – kissed the queen's hand.

The couple then journeyed to Claremont in Surrey for the honeymoon, but the presence of attendants on the journey, and at meal times, made it impossible for them to talk privately. The short four-day visit did not pass without an interruption from the queen, who was curious about her daughter's thoughts on married life. Among their wedding gifts was a maplewood desk from Queen Victoria, now at Inveraray Castle.

Following her marriage, Louise continued her charitable and artistic interests. In 1871, the Ladies Work Society was founded in South Audley Street, promoting the making and sale of needlework and embroidery for poverty relief: Louise became its president, and designed some of their products.

The couple's official place of residence was Rosneath House in Dunbartonshire.

== Viceregal consort of Canada ==
In 1878, British Prime Minister Benjamin Disraeli nominated Lorne to be Canada's Governor General, and he was duly appointed by Queen Victoria. Louise thus became his viceregal consort. As viceregal consort, she used her position to support the arts and higher education and the cause of female equality, although she said "the subject of Domestic Economy lies at the root of the – highest life of every true woman." But her stay in Canada was unhappy as a result of homesickness, dislike of Ottawa and a bad sleighing accident.

=== Inauspicious arrival ===
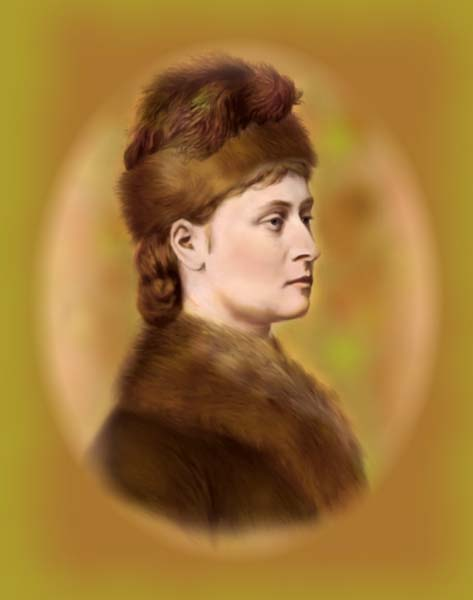
Louise in Canada

On 15 November 1878, the couple left Liverpool and arrived in Canada for the inauguration at Halifax on 25 November.

Louise became the first royal to take up residence in Rideau Hall, officially the queen's royal residence in Ottawa. However, the hall was far from the splendour of British royal residences, and, as each viceregal couple decorated the hall with their own furnishings, and thus took them when they departed, the Lornes found the palace sparse in décor upon their arrival. Louise put her artistic talents to work and hung many of her watercolour and oil paintings around the hall, also installing her sculpted works. Though the news that a daughter of the queen would be viceregal consort of Canada first saw a "thrill of joy burst upon the Dominion", it being felt that the princess would be a strong link between Canadians and their sovereign, the arrival of the new governor general and his wife was not initially welcomed by the Canadian press, which complained about the imposition of royalty on the country's hitherto un-regal society.

Relations with the press further deteriorated when Lorne's private secretary, Francis de Winton, threw four journalists off the royal train. Although the Lornes had no knowledge of de Winton's action, it was assumed by the press that they did, and they earned an early reputation for haughtiness. Louise was horrified by the negative press, and when she heard about reports of "a nation of flunkies" at the viceregal court, taking lessons in "the backward walk," Louise declared that she "wouldn't care if they came in blanket coats!" (A reference to the ubiquitous capote.) Eventually the worries of a rigid court at Rideau Hall and the "feeble undercurrent of criticism" turned out to be unfounded as the royal couple proved to be more relaxed than their predecessors.

=== Canadian entertainments ===
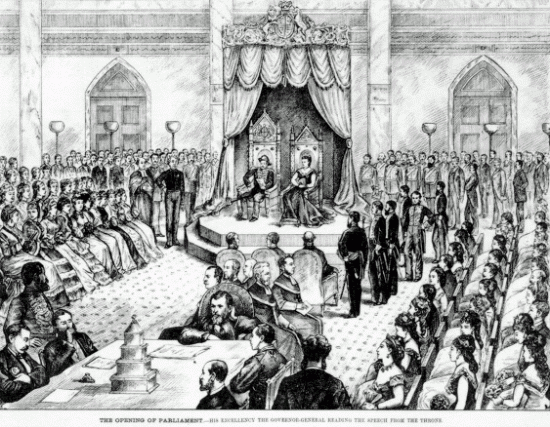
The Marquess of Lorne, accompanied by Louise, opening the Canadian Parliament in 1879

Louise's first few months in Canada were tinged with sadness as her favourite sister Alice, Grand Duchess of Hesse and by Rhine, died on 14 December 1878. Although homesick over that first Christmas, Louise soon grew accustomed to the winter climate. Sleighing and skating were two of her favourite pastimes. In Canada, as the monarch's direct representative, Lorne always took precedence over his wife, so that at the Opening of the Parliament of Canada on 13 February 1879, Louise was ranked no differently from others in attendance. She had to remain standing with the MPs, until Lorne asked them to be seated. In order for Lorne to meet every Canadian member of Parliament, he held bi-weekly dinners for 50 people. However, some of the Canadian ladies responded negatively to the British party. One of her ladies-in-waiting reported that some had an "'I'm as good as you' sort of manner when one begins a conversation." Court entertainments were open; anyone who could afford the clothing to attend functions was simply asked to sign the visitor's book. Louise's first state ball was given on 19 February 1879, and she made a good impression on her guests when she ordered the silk cordon, separating the viceregal party from the guests, be removed. However, the ball was marred by various mishaps, including a drunken bandsman nearly starting a fire by pulling a curtain over a gas lamp. The open house practice was criticized by guests who complained about the low social status of other guests. One attendee was horrified to find the attendee's grocer dancing in the same set.

One of her works as a sculptor is the statue of Queen Victoria, which now stands in front of the Royal Victoria College, Montreal, now the Strathcona Music Building of McGill University. Lorne's father, the Duke of Argyll, arrived with two of his daughters in June, and in the presence of the family, Louise caught a 28-pound (13 kg) salmon. The women's success at fishing prompted the Duke to remark that fishing in Canada required no skill.

=== Sleigh accident and Bermuda visit ===
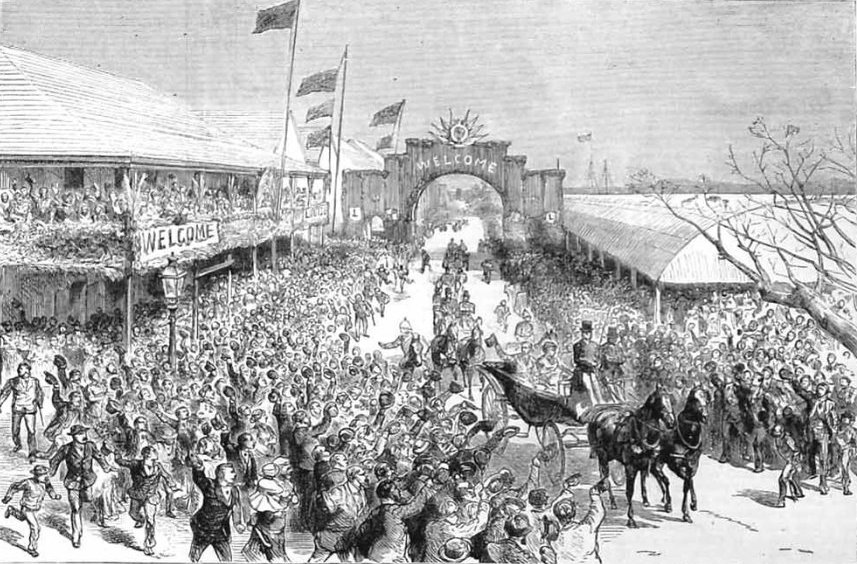
The arrival of Louise in Hamilton, Bermuda (29 January 1883)

Louise, Lorne, and two attendants, were hurt in a sleigh accident on 14 February 1880. The winter was particularly severe, and the carriage in which they were traveling overturned, throwing the coachman and footman from the sleigh. The horses then panicked, and dragged the overturned carriage over more than 400 yards (370 m) of ground. Louise was knocked unconscious when she hit her head on the iron bar supporting the roof, and Lorne was trapped underneath her, expecting "the sides of the carriage to give way at any moment". Eventually, as they overtook the sleigh ahead, the horses calmed, and the occupant of that sleigh, Louise's aide-de-camp, ordered an empty carriage to convey the injured party back to Rideau Hall.

The doctors who attended Louise reported she was severely concussed and in shock, and that "it was a wonder her skull was not fractured". Louise's ear had been injured when her earring caught on the side of the sleigh, tearing her ear lobe in two. The press played down the story on instructions from Lorne's private secretary, an act that was described by contemporaries as "stupid and ill advised". For example, one New Zealand newspaper reported, "Excepting immediately after the blow, the princess was perfectly sensible during the whole time..." Knowledge of Louise's true condition might have elicited sympathy from the Canadian people. As it was, one Member of Parliament wrote: "Except the cut in the lower part of the ear I think there was no injury done worth mentioning." Therefore, when Louise cancelled her immediate engagements, people thought she was malingering. News of the accident was also played down in Britain and in letters home to the anxious Queen Victoria. Louise left Canada for England in 1881 while her husband remained in Canada until 1883.

She played a major role in the development of the nascent tourism industry of the colony of Bermuda, 770 nautical miles (1,430 km) south-east of Nova Scotia. In 1882, Louise visited Santa Barbara, California where she was the first woman to enter the cloistered garden at the Old Mission Santa Barbara, as she met the "one category of women only, the wives of actual rulers of countries..So far there have been...(1) Princess Louise, daughter of Queen Victoria, and wife of the Governor General of Canada." [Mission Santa Barbara 1782–1965, Maynard Geiger, O.F.M.pg. 235]. In 1883, because of her fragile health, she spent the winter in Bermuda (arriving on 29 January 1883 from Charleston, South Carolina, aboard HMS Dido), popularising a trend for wealthy North Americans to escape to Bermuda's relatively mild climate during the winter months. Her visit brought such attention to Bermuda that a palatial hotel, which opened in 1885, intended to cater to these new visitors, was named after her; the Princess Hotel was built on the shore of Hamilton Harbour, in the parish of Pembroke (the Princess herself having occupied Inglewood, the home of JH Trimingham, in Paget Parish, during her visit).

=== Continued interest in Canada ===
After returning to Britain in 1883, Louise continued to take an interest in Canada. During the North-West Rebellion of 1885 she sent a certain Dr. Boyd medical supplies and a large fund of money for distribution. Her express instructions were that assistance was to be rendered to friend and foe indiscriminately. To fulfill her wishes, Boyd accompanied the Militia Medical Staff under Dr. Thomas Roddick to the sites of the Battle of Fish Creek and the Battle of Batoche to help give medical treatment to the wounded, including the Métis opposition.

In 1905, the province of Alberta was named after Louise. Within the province, Lake Louise and Mount Alberta were also named in her honour.

== Queen Victoria's last years ==
=== Family conflict ===
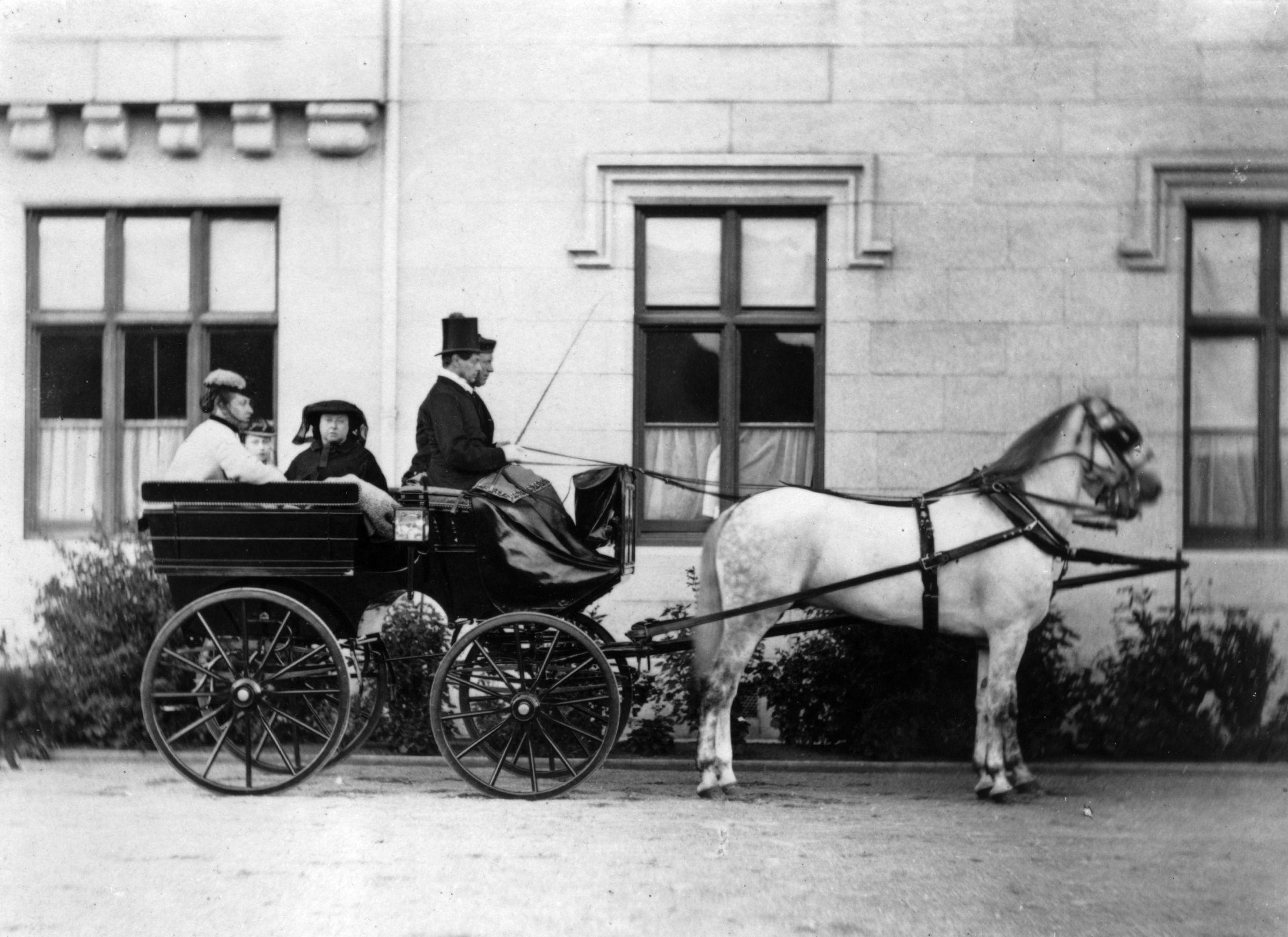
Louise and Beatrice riding with their mother

Louise returned to Britain with her husband on 27 October 1883. Queen Victoria had allocated them apartments at Kensington Palace, and the couple took up official residence in the suite that was to remain Louise's home for the rest of her life.

Louise resumed public duties in Britain, for example, opening St George's Gardens, Bloomsbury on 1 July 1884, and Lorne his political career, campaigning unsuccessfully for the Hampstead seat in 1885. In 1895, he won the South Manchester seat, entering parliament as a Liberal. Louise, unlike Lorne and his father, was in favour of Irish Home Rule, and was disappointed when he defected from Gladstonian Liberalism to the Liberal Unionists. Relations between Louise and Lorne were strained, and, despite the queen's attempts to keep them under one roof, they often went their separate ways. Even when he accompanied Louise, he was not always received with favour at court, and the Prince of Wales did not take to him. Out of all the royal family, Lorne was the only one to be identified closely with a political party, having been a Gladstonian liberal in the House of Commons.

Louise's relationship with the two sisters closest to the queen, Beatrice and Helena, was strained at best. Beatrice had married the tall and handsome Prince Henry of Battenberg in a love match in 1885, and they had four children. Louise, who had a jealous nature, had grown accustomed to treating Beatrice with pity on account of the queen's constant need for her. Beatrice's biographer, Matthew Dennison, claims that in contrast to Beatrice, Louise remained strikingly good looking throughout her forties. Louise and her husband were no longer close, and rumours spread about Lorne's alleged homosexuality. Thus, Beatrice was enjoying a satisfying sexual relationship with her popular husband, which Louise was not. Louise may have considered Prince Henry a more appropriate husband for herself. Certainly, following Prince Henry's death in 1896, Louise wrote that: "he [Henry] was almost the greatest friend I had—I, too, miss him more than I can say". In addition, Louise attempted to champion her late brother-in-law by announcing that she was his confidante and that Beatrice, a mere cipher, meant nothing to him.

=== Rumours regarding Louise ===
From late 1865 to mid 1866, the royal family was guarded by 150 Scots Fusiliers. Officially, this was to protect the family from Fenian threats, but it was whispered by members of high society that Louise had fallen pregnant by Walter Stirling, the tutor of her brother Leopold. According to Louise's biographer, Lucinda Hawksley, her son Henry was born in 1866 and shortly after the Queen's lawyers were summoned to her residence. The Queen's obstetrician Frederick Locock and his wife adopted a son named Henry, immediately after the meeting. The boy supposedly grew up with other royal children and claimed to have been Louise's child. DNA testing has been sanctioned by Henry's descendants, but courts ruled the claims unfounded.

Further rumours spread that Louise was having an affair with Arthur Bigge, later Lord Stamfordham, the queen's assistant private secretary. Beatrice mentioned the rumours to the queen's physician, calling it a "scandal", and Prince Henry claimed to have seen Bigge drinking Louise's health at dinner. Louise denied the rumour, claiming that it was started by Beatrice and Helena to undermine her position at court. However, on Henry's death, relations between the sisters sporadically improved, and it was Louise, rather than the queen, who was the first to arrive at Cimiez to be with the widowed Beatrice. Nevertheless, Louise's jealousy did not evaporate completely. James Reid, the queen's physician, wrote to his wife a few years later: "Louise is as usual much down on her sisters. Hope she won't stay long or she will do mischief!"

Rumours of affairs did not concern only Bigge. In 1890, the sculptor Sir Joseph Edgar Boehm died in Louise's presence at his studio in London, leading to rumours that the two were having an affair. According to historian Lucinda Hawksley, the two had a long-lasting love affair. Boehm's assistant, Alfred Gilbert, who played a central role in comforting Louise after Boehm's death, and supervised the destruction of Boehm's private papers, was rapidly promoted as a royal sculptor. Louise was also romantically linked to architect Edwin Lutyens; her equerry, Colonel William Probert; and an unnamed music master. However, Jehanne Wake, Louise's biographer, argues that there is no substantial evidence to suggest that Louise had sexual relationships with anyone other than her husband.

During Victoria's last years, Louise carried out a range of public duties, such as opening public buildings, laying foundation stones, and officiating at special programmes. Louise, like her eldest sister Victoria, was more liberally minded, and supported the suffragist movement, completely contrary to the queen's views. Louise privately visited Elizabeth Garrett, the first British woman openly to qualify as a physician. Queen Victoria deplored the idea of women joining professions, especially medicine, and described the training of female physicians as a "repulsive subject".

=== Louise as unconventional royal ===
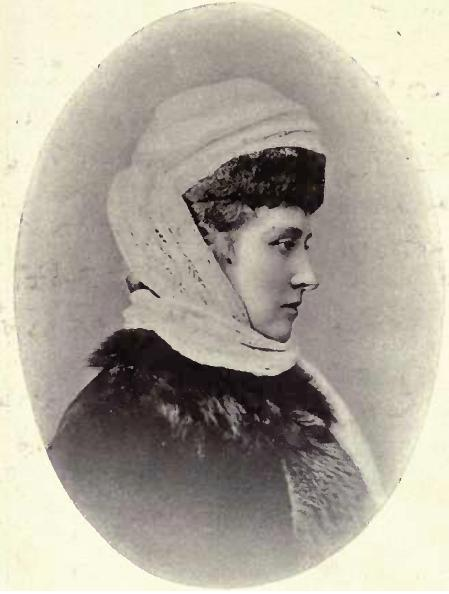
Princess Louise, Duchess of Argyll c. 1900 by William James Topley

Louise was determined to be seen as an ordinary person and not as a member of the court. When travelling abroad, she often used the alias "Mrs Campbell". Louise was known for her charity towards servants. On one occasion, the butler approached her and requested permission to dismiss the second footman, who was late getting out of bed. When she advised that the footman be given an alarm clock, the butler informed her that he already had one. She then went so far as to suggest a bed that would throw him out at a specified time, but she was told this was not feasible. Finally, she suggested that he might be ill, and when checked, he was found to have tuberculosis. The footman was therefore sent to New Zealand to recover.

On another occasion, when she visited Bermuda, she was invited to a reception and chose to walk rather than be driven. She became thirsty along the way and stopped at a house, where she asked a Black woman named Mrs McCarthy for a glass of water. Owing to the scarcity of water, the woman had to go some distance to obtain it, but was reluctant because she had to finish her ironing. When Louise offered to continue the ironing, the woman refused, adding that she was in a great hurry to finish so that she could go and see Louise. Realising that she had not been recognised, Louise enquired whether McCarthy would recognise her again. When the woman said that she would have thought so, but was admittedly unsure, Louise replied: "Well take a good look at me now, so you can be sure to know me tomorrow at St. Georges." The princess clung to her privacy, and enjoyed not being recognised.

Louise and her sisters had another disagreement after the death of the queen's close friend, Jane Spencer, Baroness Churchill. Determined not to put her mother through more misery, Louise wanted the news to be broken to the queen gradually. When this was not done, Louise voiced sharp criticism of Helena and Beatrice. One month later, on 22 January 1901, Queen Victoria died at Osborne House on the Isle of Wight. In her will, the queen bequeathed Kent House, on the Osborne Estate, to Louise as a country residence, and gave Osborne Cottage to Louise's youngest sister, Beatrice. Louise and Beatrice were now neighbours both at Kensington Palace and Osborne.

== Later life ==
=== Edwardian period ===
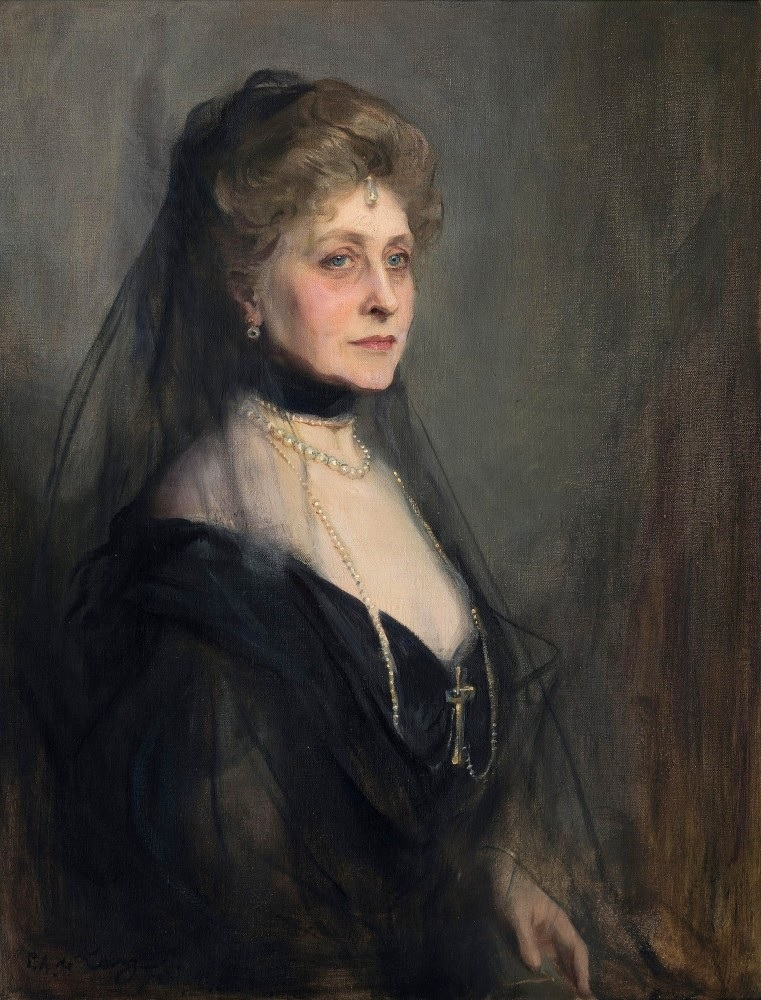
Portrait by Philip de László, 1915

Upon Queen Victoria's death, Louise entered the social circle of her brother, the new King Edward VII, with whom she had much in common, including smoking. She had an obsession with physical fitness, and if she was sneered at for this, she would retort by saying: "Never mind, I'll outlive you all." Meanwhile, Louise's husband, 9th Duke of Argyll since 1900, took his seat in the House of Lords. The Colonial Secretary, Joseph Chamberlain, offered him the office of Governor-General of Australia that year, but the offer was declined. Louise continued her sculpture, and in 1902, designed a memorial to the colonial soldiers who died in the Boer War. In the same year, she began a nude study of a married woman suggested by the English painter Sir William Blake Richmond.

Louise spent much of her time at Kent House, and she frequently visited Scotland with her husband. Financial pressures did not disappear when Lorne became Duke, and Louise avoided inviting the King to Inveraray, Argyll's ancestral home, because the couple were economising. When Queen Victoria had visited the house before Lorne became Duke of Argyll, there were seventy servants and seventy-four dogs. By the time of Edward VII's accession, there were four servants and two dogs.

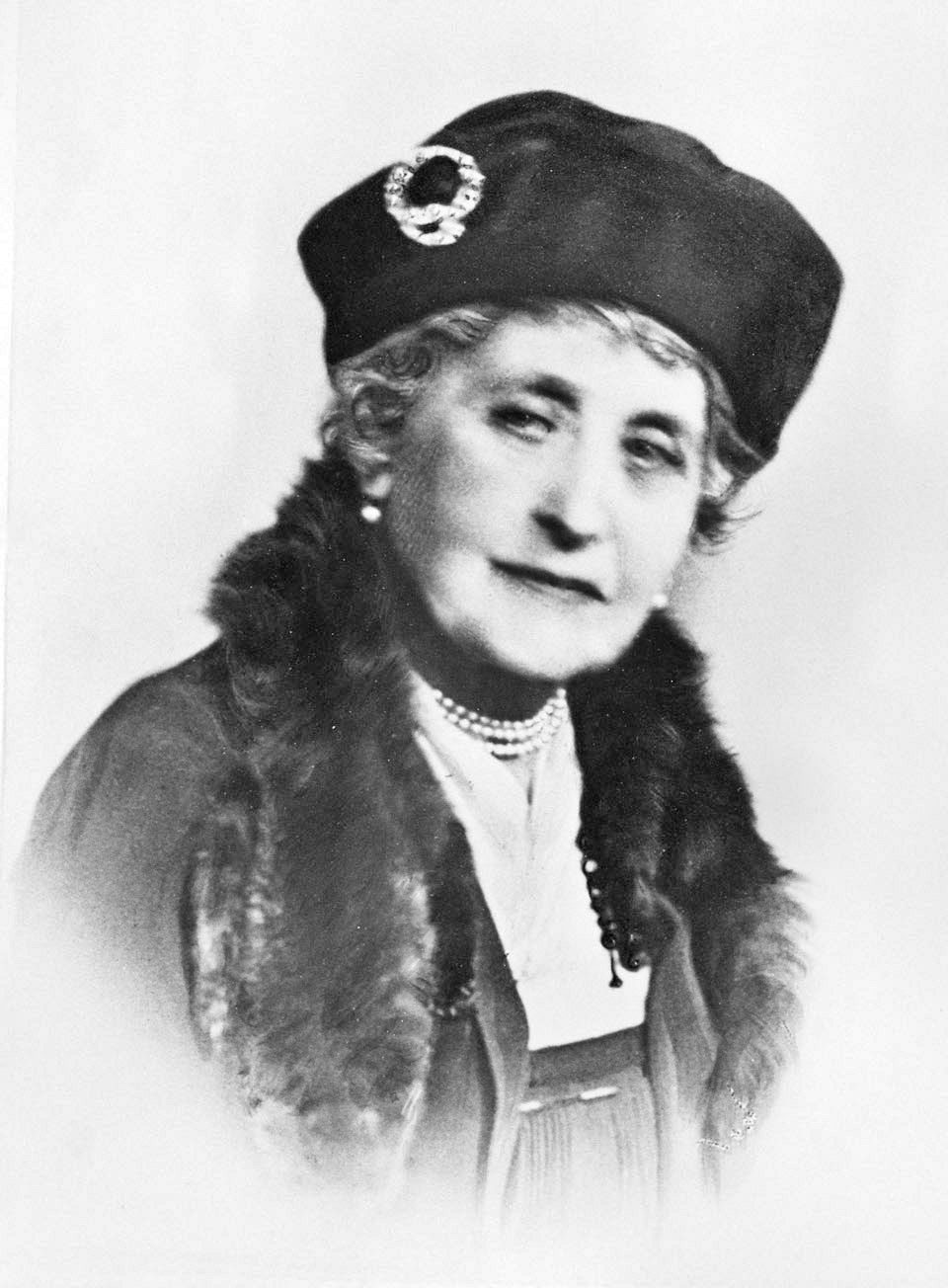
Louise in 1933

The Duke of Argyll's health continued to deteriorate. He became increasingly senile, and Louise nursed him devotedly from 1911. In these years Louise and her husband were closer than they had been before. In spring 1914 Louise stayed at Kensington Palace while her husband remained on the Isle of Wight. He developed bronchial problems followed by double pneumonia. Louise was summoned on 28 April 1914, and he died on 2 May. Following his death, Louise had a nervous breakdown and suffered from intense loneliness, writing to a friend shortly afterwards: "My loneliness without the Duke is quite terrible. I wonder what he does now!"

=== Last years ===
Louise spent her last years at Kensington Palace, occupying rooms next to her sister Princess Beatrice. She made occasional public appearances with the royal family, such as at the Cenotaph at Whitehall on 11 November 1925. In 1926, she laid the foundation stone of the Princess Louise Hospital for Children in Kensington.

In 1935, she greeted her nephew, King George V, and his wife, Queen Mary, at Kensington Town Hall during their Silver Jubilee celebrations, and was made an Honorary Freeman of the Borough of Kensington. Her last public appearance occurred in 1937, at the Home Arts and Industries Exhibition. Between these occasions, her great nephew, King Edward VIII, abdicated on 11 December 1936. In December 1936, Louise wrote to the British prime minister, Stanley Baldwin, sympathising with him about the crisis.

However, her health deteriorated. Following the accession of Edward's brother King George VI, she became too ill to move around, and was confined to Kensington Palace, affectionately called the "Auntie Palace" by Princess Elizabeth and Princess Margaret. She developed neuritis in her arm, inflammation of the nerves between the ribs, fainting fits, and sciatica. Louise occupied herself by drafting prayers, one of which was sent to Neville Chamberlain, reading "Guide our Ministers of State and all who are in authority over us ... "

== Death ==
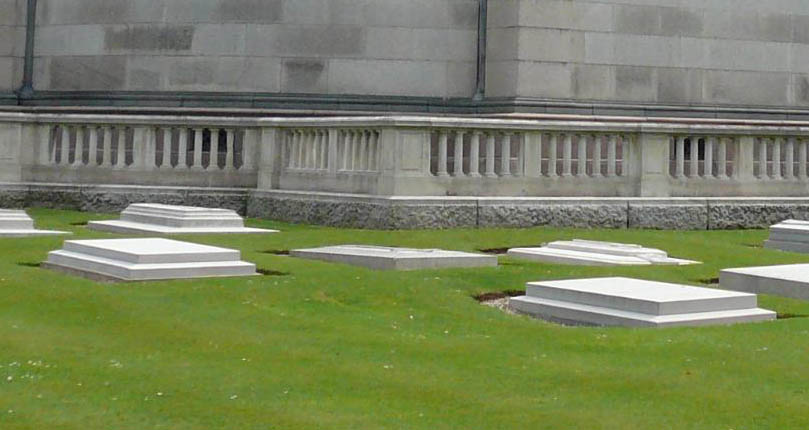
Louise's grave (centre) at the Royal Burial Ground at Frogmore

Louise died at Kensington Palace at 6:45 am on 3 December 1939, aged 91, wearing the wedding veil she had worn nearly 70 years earlier. Following a simple funeral, owing to the war, her remains were cremated at Golders Green Crematorium on 8 December. Her ashes were quietly placed in the Royal Vault at St. George's Chapel on 12 December, with many members of the British royal family and Argyll family present. Her ashes were moved to the Royal Burial Ground, Frogmore near Windsor, on 13 March 1940. Louise's will stated that if she died in Scotland she should be buried at the Campbell mausoleum in Kilmun next to her husband; if in England, at Frogmore near her parents. Her coffin was borne by eight NCOs of her own regiment, The Argyll and Sutherland Highlanders. Her estate was probated as £239,260, 18 shillings and sixpence, with her debts including 15 shillings for cigarettes.

== Legacy ==
Louise bestowed her name on four Canadian regiments: The Argyll and Sutherland Highlanders of Canada (Princess Louise's) in Hamilton, Ontario; the Princess Louise Dragoon Guards in Ottawa, Ontario (later the 4th Princess Louise Dragoon Guards – inactive since 1965); the 8th Canadian Hussars (Princess Louise's) in Moncton, New Brunswick; and the Princess Louise Fusiliers in Halifax, Nova Scotia.

Queen Elizabeth II later recalled that Louise and her sister Beatrice would talk until they stunned their audience with their output of words.

The province of Alberta in Canada is named after her. Although the name "Louise" was originally planned, the princess wished to honour her dead father, so the last of her given names was chosen. Lake Louise in Alberta is also named after her, as is Mount Alberta. Also the town of Louiseville, Quebec, located halfway between Quebec City and Montreal, was named for her as well. Although her time in Canada was not always happy, she liked the Canadian people and retained close links with her Canadian regiments. Back at home, she gained a reputation for paying unscheduled visits to hospitals, especially during her later years. Her relationship with her family was generally close. Although at times she bickered with the queen, and her sisters Helena and Beatrice, the relations did not remain strained for long. She retained a lifelong correspondence with her brother Arthur and was one of King Edward VII's favourite sisters. Of all her siblings, she was closest to Prince Leopold, Duke of Albany, and Princess Alice, and she was devastated by their deaths in 1884 and 1878 respectively.

Among the younger generations of the family, Louise's favourite relatives were the Duke and Duchess of Kent, her grandnephew and his wife. At the coronation of George VI and Elizabeth in 1937, Louise lent the Duchess the train that she had designed and had worn for the coronation of King Edward VII and Queen Alexandra in 1902.

=== Art practice ===
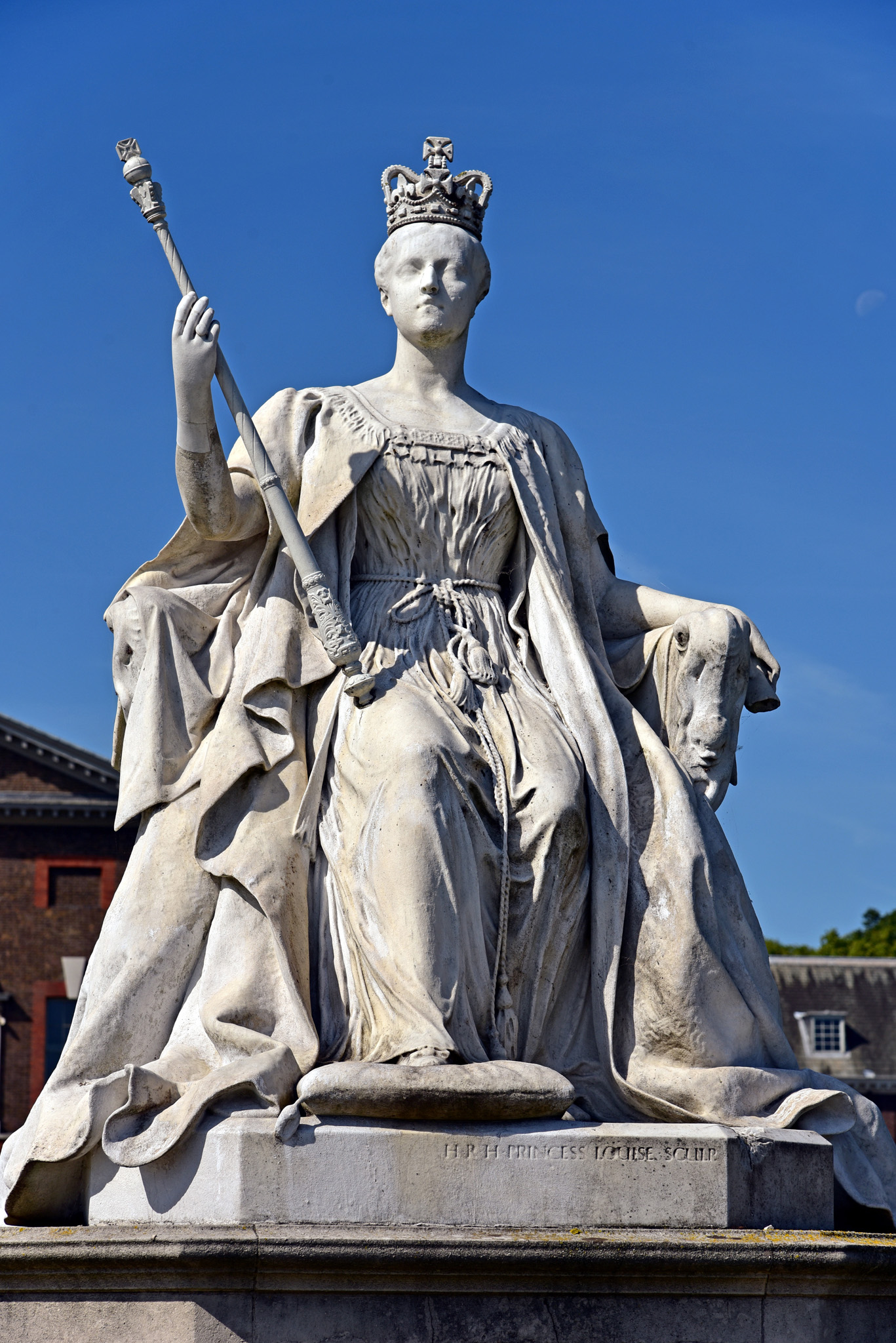
Louise's statue of Queen Victoria at Kensington Palace

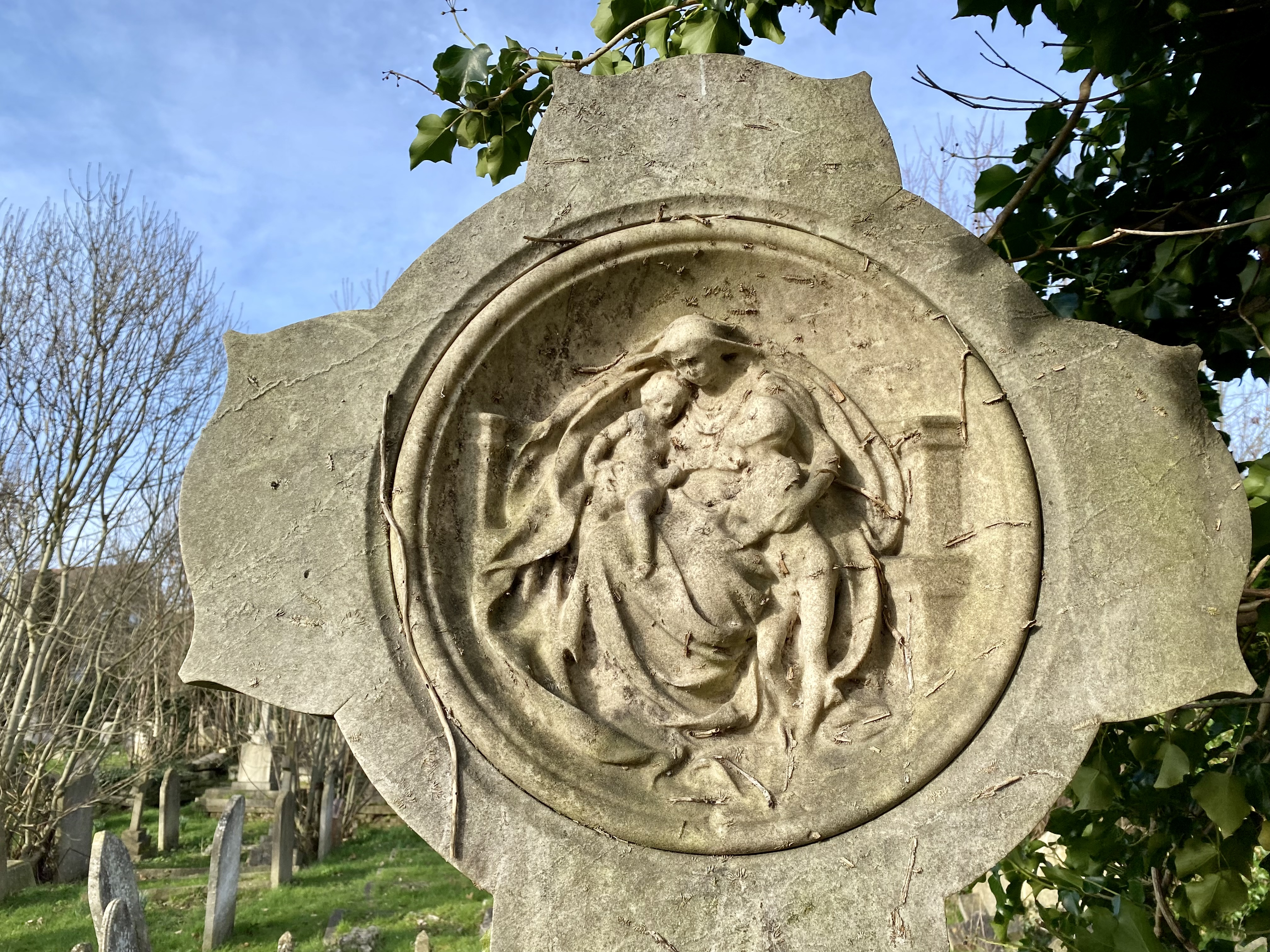
Louise's sculpture on the tomb of Mary Ann Thurston, the nanny to Victoria's children

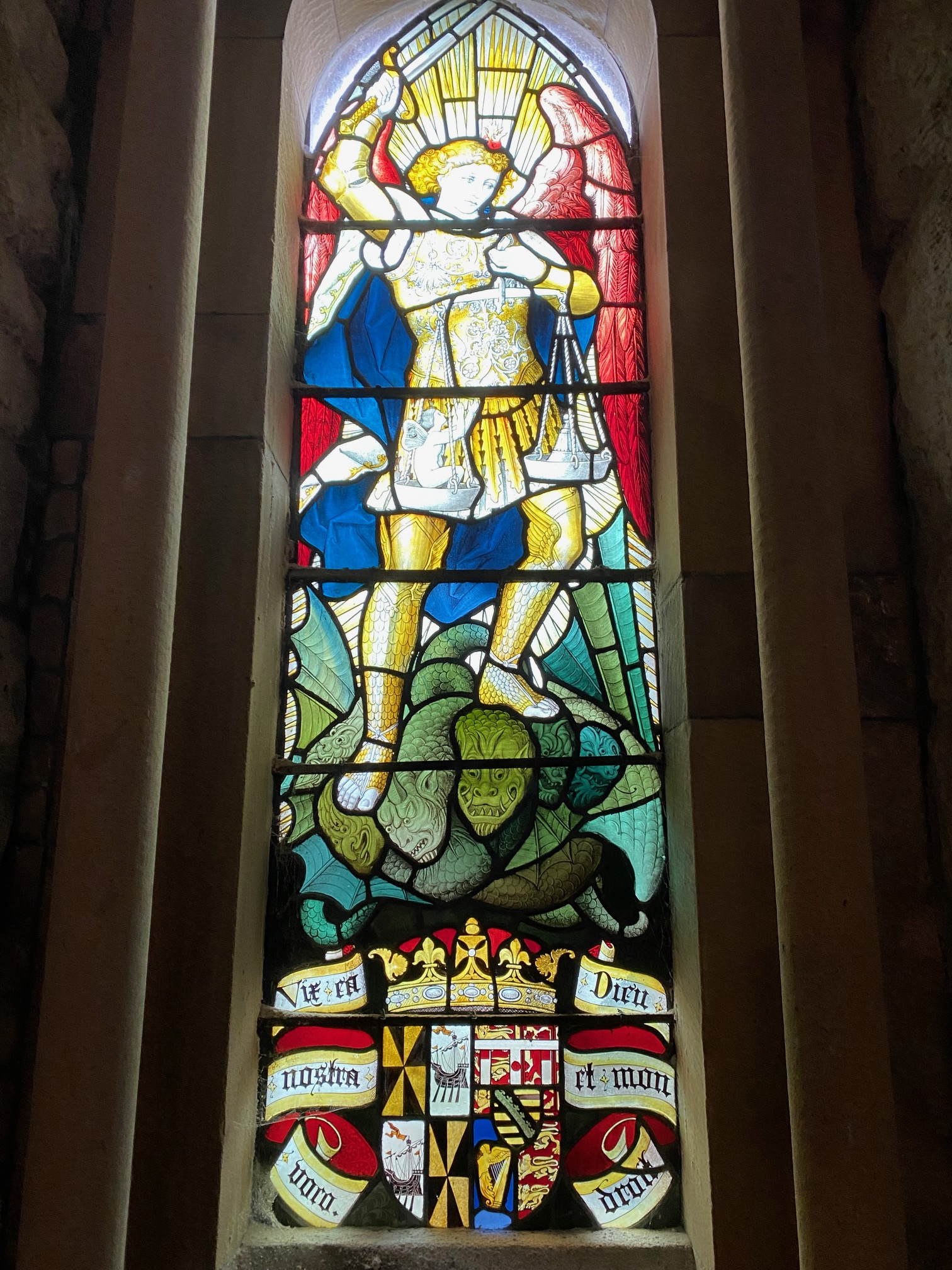
St Michael's window in St Conan's Kirk, in Lochawe

Louise had artistic training from childhood, first with Susan Durant from 1864, then Mary Thornycroft from 1867, and further lessons with Sir Joseph Edgar Boehm. She also then attended National Art Training School. Like many women artists in the nineteenth century, Louise had to make do with training intended for industrial designers and art teachers rather than fine artists. There was no training from the nude model, as there was for male art students.

Louise was the most artistically talented of Queen Victoria's daughters and was a prolific artist and sculptor. When Louise sculpted a statue of the queen, portraying her in Coronation robes, the press claimed that her tutor, Sir Edgar Boehm, was the true creator of the work. The claim was denied by Louise's friends, who asserted her effort and independence. The work was intended to be exhibited in 1887, but production was delayed until 1893. A memorial to her brother-in-law, Prince Henry of Battenberg, and a memorial to the colonial soldiers who fell during the Second Boer War, reside at Whippingham Church on the Isle of Wight, and another statue of Queen Victoria remains at McGill University in Montreal, as well as the statue of Queen Victoria on the north side of Lichfield Cathedral.

==== Selected works of art ====
===== Works on paper =====
- Queen Victoria, 1881. Pencil on paper, 36.9 x 24.0 cm (sheet of paper). Royal Collection Trust, RCIN 980422.

===== Sculpture =====
- Princess Beatrice, 1864. Marble, 55.0 x 29.0 x 23.0 cm. Royal Collection Trust, RCIN 53351.
- Prince Arthur, 1869. Marble, 61.5 x 33.0 x 26.0 cm. Royal Collection Trust, RCIN 31662.
- Prince Leopold, 1869. Marble, 43.4 x 29.0 x 19.0 cm. Royal Collection Trust, RCIN 34511.
- Queen Victoria, 1887. Bronze, 61.5 x 46 x 41 cm. Leeds Museums and Galleries, Temple Newsam House.
- Self Portrait, n.d. Terracotta, 63.5 cm. National Portrait Gallery, London.
- Memorial to Mary Ann Thurston Grade II listed monument in Kensal Green Cemetery. Thurston was nanny to Queen Victoria's children 1845–67.
- Memorial to the Colonial Forces of the Second Boer War, erected 1905, St Paul's Cathedral, London

===== Stained glass =====
- St Michael's window – Memorial to Sir Howard Elphinstone, St Anne's church, Bagshot
- St Michael's window – St Conan's Kirk, Lochawe, Argyll

== Titles, styles, honours and arms ==
=== Titles and styles ===
- 18 March 1848 – 21 March 1871: Her Royal Highness The Princess Louise
- 21 March 1871 – 24 April 1900: Her Royal Highness The Princess Louise, Marchioness of Lorne
- 24 April 1900 – 3 December 1939: Her Royal Highness The Princess Louise, Duchess of Argyll

=== Honours ===
British honours

- 21 January 1865: Lady of the Royal Order of Victoria and Albert (first class)
- 1 January 1878: Companion of the Order of the Crown of India
- 7 August 1885: Member of the Royal Red Cross
- 10 February 1904: Royal Family Order of King Edward VII
- 3 June 1911: Royal Family Order of King George V
- 3 June 1918: Dame Grand Cross of the Order of the British Empire
- 12 June 1926: Dame Grand Cross of the Venerable Order of St John
- 11 May 1937: Dame Grand Cross of the Royal Victorian Order

Foreign honours

- (Kingdom of Portugal) 8 January 1866: Dame of the Order of Queen Saint Isabel

==== Honorary military appointments ====
- (Canada) 3 July 1911: Honorary Colonel, 5th Princess Louise Dragoon Guards (which became 4th Princess Louise Dragoon Guards in 1936)
- (United Kingdom) 1913: Colonel-in-Chief, Kensington Regiment (Princess Louise's)
- (United Kingdom) 22 June 1914: Colonel-in-Chief, The Argyll and Sutherland Highlanders (Princess Louise's)
- 15 April 1930: Colonel-in-Chief, The Argyll and Sutherland Highlanders of Canada (Princess Louise's)
- (Canada) 14 August 1936: Colonel-in-Chief, The Princess Louise Fusiliers

==== Honorary roles ====
- President of the Women's Education Union from 1871
- Patron of the Girls' Day School Trust, 1872–1939
- Patron of the Ladies Lifeboat Guild, Royal National Lifeboat Institution, 1923–39

=== Arms ===
In 1858, Louise and the three younger of her sisters were granted use of the royal arms, with an inescutcheon of the shield of Saxony and differenced by a label of three points argent. On Louise's arms, the outer points bore cantons gules, and the centre a rose gules. In 1917, the inescutcheon was dropped by royal warrant from George V.

Coat of arms (1858–1917)

Royal monogram

== Ancestry ==
Ancestors of Princess Louise, Duchess of Argyll

8. Francis Frederick, Duke of Saxe-Coburg and Saalfeld
4. Ernest I of Saxe-Coburg and Gotha
9. Countess Augusta Carolina of Reuss-Ebersdorf
2. Prince Albert of Saxe-Coburg and Gotha
10. Augustus, Duke of Saxe-Gotha-Altenburg
5. Princess Louise of Saxe-Gotha-Altenburg
11. Duchess Louise Charlotte of Mecklenburg-Schwerin
1. Princess Louise of the United Kingdom
12. George III of Great Britain and Hanover
6. Prince Edward, Duke of Kent and Strathearn
13. Princess Charlotte of Mecklenburg-Strelitz
3. Queen Victoria of the United Kingdom
14. Francis Frederick, Duke of Saxe-Coburg and Saalfeld (= 8)
7. Princess Victoria of Saxe-Coburg and Saalfeld
15. Countess Augusta Carolina of Reuss-Ebersdorf (= 9)

== Sources ==
- Benson, E. F. (1938). Queen Victoria's Daughters. Appleton & Company.
- Buckle, George Earle (1926). Letters of Queen Victoria 1862–1878. London: John Murray.
- Cantelupe, Dorothy (1949). "Princess Louise, Duchess of Argyll". Oxford Dictionary of National Biography (online, DNB Archive ed.). Oxford University Press.
- Chomet, Seweryn (1999). Helena: A princess reclaimed. New York: Begell House. ISBN 1-56700-145-9.
- Dennison, Matthew (2007). The Last Princess: The Devoted Life of Queen Victoria's Youngest Daughter. London: Weidenfeld & Nicolson. ISBN 978-0-297-84794-6.
- Hawksley, Lucinda (2013). The Mystery of Princess Louise: Queen Victoria's Rebellious Daughter. London: Chatto and Windus. ISBN 0701183497
- Hubbard, R. H. (1977). Rideau Hall. Montreal and London: McGill-Queen's University Press. ISBN 978-0-7735-0310-6.
- Lang, Cecil Y.; Shannon, Edgar F. Jr., eds. (1987). The Letters of Alfred Lord Tennyson Volume II 1851–1870. Cambridge, Mass.: Harvard University Press. ISBN 0-674-52583-3.
- Longford, Elizabeth (1987). Victoria R. I. (Second ed.). London: Weidenfeld & Nicolson. ISBN 0-297-84142-4.
- Longford, Elizabeth (1991). Darling Loosy: Letters to Princess Louise 1856 to 1939. London: Weidenfeld & Nicolson. ISBN 0-297-81179-7.
- Lutyens, Mary (1961). Lady Lytton's Diary. London: Rupert Hart-Davies.
- MacDermot, H. E. (1938). Sir Thomas Roddick: His Work in Medicine and Public Life. Canada: MacMillan Co.
- Marshall, Dorothy (1972). The Life and Times of Victoria. London: Weidenfeld & Nicolson. OCLC 300168891.
- Martínez, Tori V. (2005). "Swiss Cottage: A Royal Playhouse". Time Travel Britain.
- McDougall, D. Blake (1988). "Princess Louise Caroline Alberta, Youth (1848–1878)". Edmonton Legislature Library. Legislative Assembly of Alberta.
- McDougall, D. Blake (1988). "Princess Louise Caroline Alberta, Later years (1883–1939)". Edmonton Legislature Library. Legislative Assembly of Alberta.
- Morgan, Henry James, ed. (1903). Types of Canadian Women and of Women who are or have been Connected with Canada. Toronto: Williams Briggs.
- Ralph Lewis, Brenda (1996). "Princess Louise". Britannia. Britannia Internet Magazine. Archived from the original on 5 June 2011.
- Reid, Micheala (1996). Ask Sir James: the life of Sir James Reid, personal physician to Queen Victoria. London: Eland. ISBN 978-0-90787-152-1.
- Sandwell, R. W. (2006). "Dreaming of the Princess: Love, Subversion, and the Rituals of Empire in British Columbia, 1882". In Coates, Colin MacMillan (ed.). Majesty in Canada: Essays on the Role of Royalty. Toronto: Dundurn Press Ltd. ISBN 978-1-55002-586-6.
- Stocker, Mark. "Louise, Princess, duchess of Argyll (1848–1939)". Oxford Dictionary of National Biography (online ed.). Oxford University Press. doi:10.1093/ref:odnb/34601. (Subscription, Wikipedia Library access or UK public library membership required.)
- Stocker, Mark. "Boehm, Sir (Joseph) Edgar [formerly Josef Erasmus Böhm], baronet (1834–1890)". Oxford Dictionary of National Biography (online ed.). Oxford University Press. doi:10.1093/ref:odnb/2762. (Subscription, Wikipedia Library access or UK public library membership required.)
- Queen Victoria of Great Britain (1884). More Leaves from the Journal of a Life in the Highlands from 1862 to 1882. London: Smith & Elder, & Co.
- Waite, P. B. (1998). "Campbell, John George Edward Henry Douglas Sutherland, Marquess of Lorne and 9th Duke of Argyll". In Cook, Ramsay; Hamelin, Jean (eds.). Dictionary of Canadian Biography. Vol. XIV (1911–1920) (online ed.). University of Toronto Press.
- Wake, Jehanne (1988). Princess Louise: Queen Victoria's unconventional daughter. London: Collins. ISBN 0-00-217076-0.
- 1 artwork by or after Princess Louise, Duchess of Argyll at the Art UK site
- St Conan's Kirk - St Michael's Window

Princess Louise, Duchess of Argyll House of Saxe-Coburg and Gotha Cadet branch of the House of Wettin Born: 18 March 1848 Died: 3 December 1939
Honorary titles
Preceded by The Countess of Dufferin	Viceregal consort of Canada; 1878–1883	Succeeded by The Marchioness of Lansdowne
