= Happy and Glorious (TV series) =

1952 British television series

Happy and Glorious was a 1952 British television series which aired on the BBC. It starred Renée Asherson as Queen Victoria and Michael Aldridge as Prince Albert. The series aired live, and the transmissions were not recorded. The oldest surviving examples of British television drama come from 1953, consisting of two episodes of The Quatermass Experiment and two or three episodes of Sunday-Night Theatre, recording using the then-experimental telerecording process. Half the scripts were by Laurence Housman, drawn from his 1934 play Victoria Regina, also adapted for BBC Radio in 1981 under the title Happy and Glorious.
