= 1936 in the United Kingdom =

Events from the year 1936 in the United Kingdom.

This year is notable for the death of George V early in the year, the accession of his son Edward VIII to the throne and his subsequent abdication, resulting in the accession to the throne of his younger brother George VI (previously Albert, Duke of York). 1936 in the United Kingdom is also known as the Year of the Three Kings.

== Incumbents ==
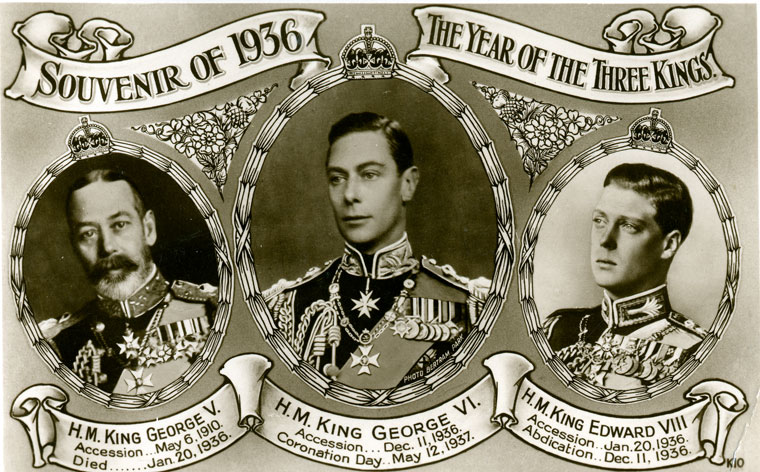
"The Year of the Three Kings", postcard 1936

- Monarch – George V (until 20 January), Edward VIII (starting 20 January, until 11 December), George VI (starting 11 December)
- Prime Minister – Stanley Baldwin (Coalition)

== Events ==
- 4 January – England celebrates its first ever win over the All Blacks in rugby union, in particular the two famous tries by "The Prince" HH Alexander Obolensky.
- 13 January – GPO Film Unit documentary Night Mail, incorporating poetry by W. H. Auden and music by Benjamin Britten, is premiered at the Cambridge Arts Theatre.
- 20 January – King George V dies at Sandringham House, Norfolk, aged 70. His eldest son, Edward, Prince of Wales succeeds as King Edward VIII.
- 21 January – King Edward VIII breaks royal protocol by watching the proclamation of his own accession to the throne from a window of St. James's Palace, in the company of the still-married Wallis Simpson.
- February – John Maynard Keynes's influential economic text The General Theory of Employment, Interest and Money is published.
- 6–16 February – Great Britain and Northern Ireland compete at the Winter Olympics in Garmisch-Partenkirchen, Germany, and win 1 gold, 1 silver and 1 bronze medals.
- 5 March – First test flight of the Supermarine Spitfire, from Eastleigh Aerodrome.
- March – K6 red telephone box introduced, together with GPO 'Jubilee concession' to provide one in every village with a post office.
- 11 April – Billy Butlin opens his first Butlins holiday camp, Butlins Skegness in Skegness (Ingoldmells), Lincolnshire. It is officially opened by Amy Johnson.
- 18 April – Ordnance Survey begins the retriangulation of Great Britain with its first triangulation station near Cold Ashby, Northamptonshire.
- 17 May – Barquentine Waterwitch is laid up at Par, Cornwall, the last square rigged ship to trade under sail alone in British ownership.
- 22 May – J. H. Thomas resigns from politics for leaking Budget proposals.
- 27 May – The RMS Queen Mary leaves Southampton on her maiden voyage to New York.
- 28 May – Alan Turing submits his paper "On Computable Numbers" to the London Mathematical Society for publication, introducing the concept of the "Turing machine". It is formally published on 12 November.
- 3 July
  - First flight of the Short Empire flying boat, from Rochester, Kent.
  - Fred Perry wins his third successive men's singles tennis title at The Championships, Wimbledon, the last British player to win this title until 2013. This year he also wins his third U.S. National Championship, the last Grand Slam victory for a British men's player until 2012, and turns professional.
- 16 July – George McMahon makes a botched attempt to shoot King Edward VIII after the Trooping the Colour ceremony.
- 24 July – The General Post Office introduces the speaking clock.
- 26 July – Charlotte Bryant is hanged at HM Prison Exeter for the murder of her husband Frederick by arsenic in Dorset.
- 27 July – Opening of a new swimming pool at Morecambe, claimed to be the largest open-air example in Europe.
- 28 July – Great Britain wins the 1936 International Lawn Tennis Challenge at Wimbledon, the last British victory until 2015 in what becomes the Davis Cup.
- 31 July – Public Health Act empowers local authorities to make byelaws regulating building construction.
- August–September – Bournemouth typhoid outbreak: more than 700 people infected.
- 1–16 August – Great Britain and Northern Ireland compete at the Olympics in Berlin and win 4 gold, 7 silver and 3 bronze medals.
- 4 August – The Duke of Grafton is killed in a crash while competing in the Limerick Grand Prix in Ireland, aged only 22. His cousin succeeds to the main title, but the courtesy titles fall into abeyance.
- 6 August – An underground explosion at Wharncliffe Woodmoor Colliery in South Yorkshire kills 58.
- 26 August – Signing of the Anglo-Egyptian Treaty which requires the withdrawal of British troops and recognises Egypt as a sovereign state.
- 31 August – Elizabeth Cowell becomes the first female British television presenter, making a broadcast from Alexandra Palace.
- 8 September – Arson attack on a bombing school building at Penyberth on the Llŷn Peninsula as part of the Tân yn Llŷn campaign led by Saunders Lewis, Lewis Valentine and D. J. Williams of the Welsh nationalist group Plaid Genedlaethol Cymru.
- 30 September – Official opening of Pinewood Studios.
- 4 October – Battle of Cable Street between Oswald Mosley's British Union of Fascists and anti-fascist demonstrators in the East End of London.
- 14 October – The Night Ferry, a boat train service linking London with Paris, starts operation.
- 5–31 October – Jarrow March: 207 miners march from Jarrow to London in a protest against unemployment and poverty.
- 20 October – Prime minister Stanley Baldwin confronts King Edward VIII about his relationship with Wallis Simpson.
- 22 October – Dod Orsborne, captain of the fishing vessel Girl Pat, which had caused a media sensation when it went missing, is convicted of its theft and given a prison sentence.
- 27 October – Wallis Simpson obtains a decree nisi in her divorce from Ernest Aldrich Simpson, removing a legal barrier to her marrying Edward VIII.
- 2 November – The BBC launches the world's first regular television service in London, initially alternating between the 240-line Baird electromechanical and the Marconi-EMI all-electronic 405-line television systems.
- 3 November – The State Opening of Parliament is held; it is Edward VIII's only state opening. The ceremonial procession is cancelled due to heavy rain.
- 6 November – Terence Rattigan's comedy French Without Tears premieres in London.
- 12 November – Alan Turing's paper "On Computable Numbers" is formally presented to the London Mathematical Society, introducing the concept of the "Turing machine".
- 16 November – King Edward VIII informs Stanley Baldwin of his intention to marry Wallis Simpson. Baldwin responds by informing the King that any woman he married would have to become Queen, and the British public would not accept Wallis Simpson as Queen. The King tells Mr Baldwin that he is prepared to abdicate if the government opposes his marriage.
- 25 November – The King tells Stanley Baldwin that he would be prepared to conduct a morganatic marriage with Mrs Simpson, which would allow him to carry on as King but not install Mrs Simpson as Queen. Stanley Baldwin informs him that this would not be accepted either (such a thing has never been known in British law).
- 27 November – Stanley Baldwin raises the issue of a morganatic marriage in the Cabinet, where it is rejected outright.
- 30 November – The Crystal Palace in south London is destroyed in a fire.
- December – Henry Hallett Dale wins the Nobel Prize in Physiology or Medicine jointly with Otto Loewi "for their discoveries relating to chemical transmission of nerve impulses".

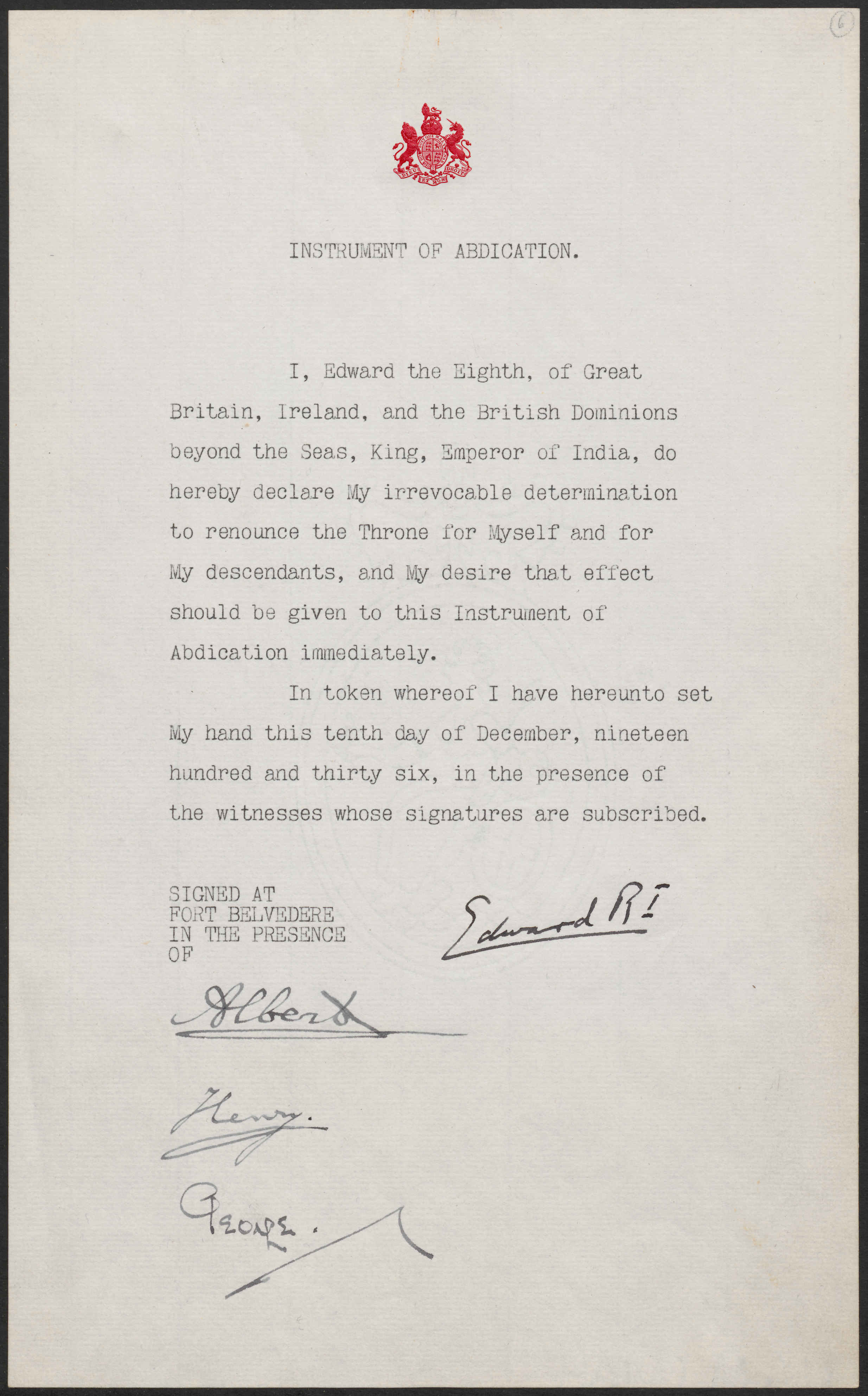
The Instrument of Abdication

- 1 December – Alfred Blunt, Bishop of Bradford, makes a speech which inadvertently leads to the abdication crisis becoming public in the British media.
- 2 December – Stanley Baldwin confirms in a meeting with the King that a morganatic marriage would not be accepted, and in order to marry Mrs Simpson the King would have to abdicate.
- 9 December – A KLM (Netherlands airline) Douglas DC-2 airliner crashes in Purley shortly after takeoff from Croydon Airport, killing 14 (including Juan de la Cierva and Admiral Arvid Lindman) with just two survivors.
- 10 December – Abdication crisis: the King signs an instrument of abdication at Fort Belvedere in the presence of his three brothers, The Duke of York, The Duke of Gloucester and The Duke of Kent.
- 11 December
  - Parliament passes His Majesty's Declaration of Abdication Act 1936, providing the legislative authority for the King to abdicate.
  - The King performs his last act as sovereign by giving royal assent to the Act.
  - Prince Albert, Duke of York, becomes King, ruling as King George VI. His daughter, Princess Elizabeth, becomes heir presumptive.
  - The abdicated King Edward VIII, now the Prince Edward, makes a broadcast to the nation explaining his decision to abdicate. He leaves the country for Austria.
  - The Oireachtas of the Irish Free State passes the Constitution (Amendment No. 27) Act 1936, removing most powers from the office of Governor-General of the Irish Free State, and the Executive Authority (External Relations) Act 1936 assenting to the abdication and restricting the power of the monarch in relation to Ireland to international affairs.
- 18 December – Public Order Act prevents wearing of political uniforms with effect from 1 January next.
- 25 December – Princess Alexandra of Kent, daughter of The Duke and Duchess of Kent, is born in London. This will be the last royal birth attended by the Home Secretary, in this case, John Simon, 1st Viscount Simon.
- Date unknown – Peter Jones (department store) in London, designed by William Crabtree, is completed as a pioneering example in the UK of glass curtain wall architecture.

== Publications ==
- The Left Book Club is founded by Stafford Cripps, Victor Gollancz, John Strachey and Harold Laski.
- W. H. Auden's poems Look, Stranger!.
- A. J. Ayer's philosophical study Language, Truth, and Logic.
- Alfred Bestall's text comic The New Adventures of Rupert, the first Rupert Bear annual.
- Agatha Christie's Hercule Poirot novels The A.B.C. Murders, Murder in Mesopotamia and Cards on the Table.
- T. S. Eliot's Collected Poems 1909–35, including "Burnt Norton", first of the Four Quartets.
- The Geographers' Map Co.'s first A to Z Atlas and Guide to London and the Suburbs.
- Aldous Huxley's novel Eyeless in Gaza.
- Michael Innes' novel Death at the President's Lodging.
- John Maynard Keynes' text The General Theory of Employment, Interest and Money.
- F. R. Leavis’ critical work Revaluation: tradition & development in English poetry.
- A. E. W. Mason's historical adventure novel Fire Over England.
- H. J. Massingham's English Downland and Hugh Quigley's The Highlands of Scotland, first in Batsford's The Face of Britain series.
- Lancashire: cradle of our prosperity and Warwickshire: Shakespeare's country, first in The King's England series edited by Arthur Mee.
- George Orwell's novel Keep the Aspidistra Flying.
- Michael Roberts edits the anthology The Faber Book of Modern Verse.
- Dylan Thomas’ Twenty-five Poems, including "And death shall have no dominion".
- W. B. Yeats edits the anthology The Oxford Book of Modern Verse 1892–1935.

== Births ==
- 7 January – Hunter Davies, Scottish-born author and journalist
- 8 January – Dennis Gillespie, Scottish footballer (died 2001)
- 12 January – Sir William McAlpine, 6th Baronet, engineering construction executive (died 2018)
- 15 January – Richard Franklin, actor (died 2023)
- 16 January – Michael White, impresario and film producer (died 2016)
- 20 January – Frances Shand Kydd, mother of Diana, Princess of Wales (died 2004)
- 28 January – Bill Jordan, economist and politician
- 29 January – Patrick Caulfield, painter and printmaker (died 2005)
- 7 February
  - William Bennett, flautist (died 2022)
  - Keith Rowlands, rugby union player (died 2006)
- 9 February – Clive Swift, actor (died 2019)
- 10 February – Joss Naylor, fell runner (died 2024)
- 17 February – John Leyton, actor and singer
- 18 February – Philip Jones Griffiths, photojournalist (died 2008)
- 24 February – Lance Reventlow, playboy, entrepreneur and racing driver (died 1972)
- 13 March
  - Michael Davies, writer on Roman Catholicism (died 2004)
  - Mary Susan McIntosh, sociologist, feminist, political activist and campaigner for lesbian and gay rights (died 2013)
- 26 March – John Malcolm, actor (died 2008)
- 28 March – Peter Mayer, publisher (died 2018 in the US)
- 29 March – Richard Rodney Bennett, composer (died 2012 in the US)
- 3 April – Tony Garnett, television producer (died 2020)
- 7 April – Peter Eckersley, television producer (died 1981)
- 10 April – John Howell, Olympic long jumper
- 21 April – Edna Savage, singer (died 2000)
- 24 April – Vera Rich, poet and translator (died 2009)
- 29 April – Jacob Rothschild, investment banker (died 2024)
- 30 April – Bernie Clifton, comedian and entertainer
- 2 May – Engelbert Humperdinck, singer
- 4 May – Stanley McMurtry ("Mac"), cartoonist
- 9 May
  - Terry Downes, middleweight boxer (died 2017)
  - Albert Finney, actor (died 2019)
  - Glenda Jackson, actress and politician (died 2023)
- 10 May
  - Anthea Bell, translator (died 2018)
  - Timothy Birdsall, cartoonist (died 1963)
- 13 May – Matt Simpson, poet (died 2009)
- 15 May – Ralph Steadman, caricaturist
- 16 May – Roy Hudd, comedian (died 2020)
- 18 May – Sonia Taverner, ballet dancer (died 2018)
- 23 May
  - Tom Burlison, footballer and trade unionist (died 2008)
  - Robert Sangster, racehorse owner (died 2004)
- 26 May
  - David Hirst, journalist (died 2025)
  - David Stevens, Baron Stevens of Ludgate, politician
- 27 May
  - Eric Anderson, Scottish-born teacher, Provost of Eton College (died 2020)
  - Benjamin Bathurst, admiral of the fleet, First Sea Lord (died 2025)
- 1 June – Gerald Scarfe, cartoonist and illustrator
- 2 June – Richard Harries, Baron Harries of Pentregarth, bishop and theologian
- 7 June – Chris Bryant, screenwriter (died 2008)
- 17 June – Ken Loach, film director
- 20 June – Philip Lowrie, actor (died 2025)
- 22 June
  - Dick Huddart, English-Australian professional rugby league footballer (died 2021)
  - Derek Porter, English footballer (died 2023)
- 23 June – Gordon Lewis, Welsh rugby union and professional rugby league footballer
- 24 June
  - Tony Brown, cricketer and administrator (died 2020)
  - J. H. Prynne, poet and academic (died 2026)
- 26 June – Robert Maclennan, Baron Maclennan of Rogart, Scottish politician (died 2020)
- 27 June – Shirley Anne Field, actress (died 2023)
- 28 June – Malcolm Harding, English-born Canadian Anglican bishop
- 30 June – Malcolm Hickman, English cricketer
- 3 July – Anthony Lester, barrister and politician (died 2020)
- 5 July – James Mirrlees, Scottish economist and winner of the 1996 Nobel Memorial Prize in Economic Sciences (died 2018)
- 7 July – Christopher Mallaby, diplomat (died 2022)
- 8 July – Tony Warren, television screenwriter (died 2016)
- 9 July – Richard Wilson, Scottish actor and director
- 11 July – John Stride, actor (died 2018)
- 16 July – Mary Parkinson, journalist and television presenter
- 20 July – John Sillett, football player and manager (died 2021)
- 26 July – Mary Millar, actress (died 1998)
- 30 July – Ted Rogers, comedian and game show host (died 2001)
- 1 August
  - W. D. Hamilton, evolutionary biologist (died 2000)
  - Donald Neilson, serial killer known as the "Black Panther" (died 2011)
- 2 August
  - Christopher Hogg, business executive (died 2021)
  - Anthony Payne, composer (died 2021)
- 3 August – Edward Petherbridge, actor, writer and artist
- 7 August – Brian Barry, philosopher (died 2009)
- 8 August – Jan Pieńkowski, author and artist (born in Poland; died 2022)
- 11 August – Jim Thompson, Anglican bishop (died 2003)
- 17 August – Arthur Rowe, Olympic shot putter (died 2003)
- 24 August – A. S. Byatt, novelist and poet (died 2023)
- 3 September – Mike Ellis, hammer thrower
- 5 September – Robert Alexander, Baron Alexander of Weedon, barrister, banker and life peer (died 2005)
- 7 September - George Cassidy, jazz musician, music teacher of Van Morrison (died 2023)
- 10 September – Michael Hartshorn, British-New Zealand organic chemist (died 2017)
- 11 September – Brian Plummer, writer and dog breeder (died 2003)
- 14 September – Nicol Williamson, actor (died 2011)
- 16 September – David Smeeton, journalist (died 2020)
- 19 September
  - Frank Barrie, actor, director and writer (died 2025)
  - Anna Karen, actress (died 2022)
- 20 September – Andrew Davies, Welsh writer
- 30 September – Meg Johnson, actress (died 2023)
- 1 October
  - Duncan Edwards, footballer (died 1958)
  - John Gray, diplomat (died 2003)
- 4 October – Giles Radice, politician (died 2022)
- 6 October – Bob White, cricketer (died 2023)
- 9 October – Brian Blessed, actor
- 17 October – Dolores Mantez, actress (died 2012)
- 21 October – Simon Gray, playwright (died 2008)
- 22 October – John Blashford-Snell, soldier and explorer
- 24 October – Bill Wyman, rock bassist
- 25 October – Martin Gilbert, historian (died 2015)
- 30 October – George Sassoon, scientist and writer (died 2006)
- 31 October – Gordon Beningfield, wildlife artist and broadcaster (died 1998)
- 1 November – Eddie Colman, footballer (died 1958)
- 7 November – Gwyneth Jones, Welsh soprano
- 8 November – Bob Holman, Christian socialist (died 2016)
- 11 November – Harry Bramma, organist and composer (died 2026)
- 16 November – Geoffrey Thompson, businessman (died 2004)
- 22 November – John Bird, satiric actor (died 2022)
- 23 November – Robert Barnard, writer, critic and lecturer (died 2013)
- 16 December – Maurice Setters, footballer (died 2020)
- 17 December – Tommy Steele, actor and singer
- 21 December – Peter Tinniswood, scriptwriter (died 2003)
- 22 December – James Burke, broadcaster, science historian, author and television producer
- 25 December – Princess Alexandra of Kent, daughter of The Duke and Duchess of Kent

== Deaths ==
- 18 January – Rudyard Kipling, writer, Nobel Prize laureate (born 1865 in British India)
- 20 January – King George V (born 1865)
- 2 March – Princess Victoria Melita of Saxe-Coburg and Gotha, granddaughter of Queen Victoria (born 1876 in Malta; died in Germany)
- 20 March – Cunninghame Graham, politician, adventurer and writer (born 1852)
- 30 April – A. E. Housman, poet (born 1859)
- 14 May – Edmund Allenby, 1st Viscount Allenby, Field-Marshal (born 1861)
- 29 May – Percy Dearmer, Christian socialist Anglican priest and liturgist (born 1867)
- 4 June – Mathilde Verne, pianist and educator (born 1865)
- 14 June – G. K. Chesterton, writer (born 1874)
- 25 July – Sir Henry Wellcome, pharmaceutical entrepreneur and philanthropist (born 1853 in the United States)
- 4 August – John FitzRoy, 9th Duke of Grafton, peer and racing driver (born 1914; killed while racing)
- 19 August – Hugh Lygon, aristocrat (born 1904)
- 21 September – Frank Hornby, inventor, businessman and politician (born 1863)
- 14 October – Edmond Holmes, educationalist, writer and poet (born 1850 in Ireland)
- 2 November – Martin Lowry, chemist (born 1874)
- 11 November – Sir Edward German, composer (born 1862)
- 10 December – Bobby Abel, cricketer (born 1857)
- 29 December – Lucy, Lady Houston, political activist, suffragette, philanthropist and promoter of aviation (born 1857)

== See also ==
- List of British films of 1936
