= Proclamation of accession of Elizabeth II =

Formalities when Elizabeth II became queen

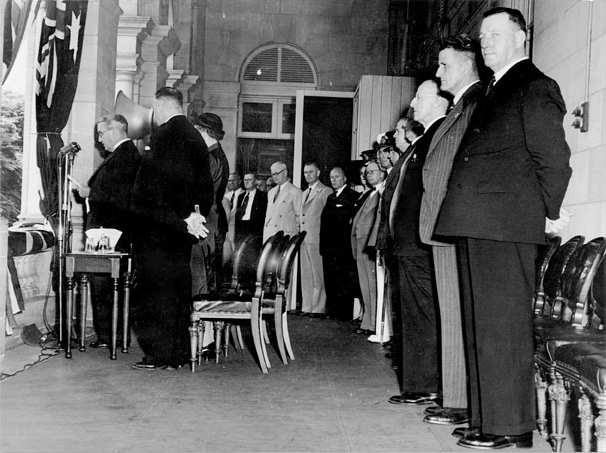
The proclamation of the accession of Queen Elizabeth II to the Australian throne being read at Queensland's Government House by Governor Sir John Lavarack

Elizabeth II was proclaimed Queen of the United Kingdom and other Commonwealth realms after her father, King George VI, died in the early hours of 6 February 1952, while Elizabeth was in Kenya. Proclamations were made in different Commonwealth realms on 6, 7, 8, and 11 February (depending on geographic location and time zone). The line of succession was identical in all the Commonwealth realms, but the royal title as proclaimed was not the same in all of them. Elizabeth was crowned at Westminster Abbey in London on 2 June 1953.

== United Kingdom ==
In the United Kingdom, the Accession Council met twice at St James's Palace: first at 5 p.m. on Wednesday, 6 February, before the Queen had returned from Kenya, to make their proclamation declaring the accession of the new sovereign, as the late king's successor in accordance with the line of succession to the British throne, and, second, at a meeting begun at 10 a.m. on Friday, 8 February, when the Queen was present, to receive her oath for the security of the Church of Scotland and her personal declaration that she would always work to uphold constitutional government and to advance the happiness and prosperity of her peoples all the world over. Her declaration for securing the Protestant succession, as required by the 1689 Bill of Rights and the Accession Declaration Act 1910, was made later, at the next state opening of parliament, on 4 November.

After the Accession Council had completed the formalities, their proclamation of 6 February was issued for publication in a supplement to that day's London Gazette:

WHEREAS it hath pleased Almighty God to call to His Mercy our late Sovereign Lord King George the Sixth of Blessed and Glorious memory, by whose Decease the Crown is solely and rightfully come to the High and Mighty Princess Elizabeth Alexandra Mary:
WE, therefore, the Lords Spiritual and Temporal of this Realm, being here assisted with these His late Majesty's Privy Council, with representatives of other Members of the Commonwealth, with other Principal Gentlemen of Quality, with the Lord Mayor, Aldermen, and Citizens of London, do now hereby with one voice and Consent of Tongue and Heart publish and proclaim that the High and Mighty Princess Elizabeth Alexandra Mary is now, by the death of our late Sovereign of happy memory, become Queen Elizabeth the Second, by the Grace of God Queen of this Realm and of all Her other Realms and Territories, Head of the Commonwealth, Defender of the Faith, to whom Her lieges do acknowledge all Faith and constant Obedience with hearty and humble Affection, beseeching God by whom Kings and Queens do reign, to bless the Royal Princess Elizabeth the Second with long and happy Years to reign over us.
Given at St. James's Palace this Sixth Day of February in the year of our Lord one thousand nine hundred and fifty-two.

The accession proclamation was published in The Times on 7 February, quoting the London Gazette. According to the Times, it was expected that the public proclamation would be made in due form by the heralds of the College of Arms. The practice had been to read it first from the Friary Court balcony at St James's Palace and, in the City of London, the custom had been to lay it before the Court of Aldermen and to read it, after a ceremony at Temple Bar, London, at the corner of Chancery Lane, in Fleet Street, and at the Royal Exchange.

After the meeting with the Queen at St James's Palace in the morning of 8 February, the accession proclamation was read to the public by the Garter King of Arms, Sir George Bellew, first at 11 a.m. from the Friary Court balcony, then in Trafalgar Square, in Fleet Street, and at the Royal Exchange.

== Other Commonwealth realms ==
Each of the Commonwealth realms issued similar proclamations of the accession of the Queen.

=== Australia ===
The Governor-General of Australia, Sir William McKell, issued the proclamation of Elizabeth's accession as Queen of Australia on Thursday, 7 February. It was read from the steps of Parliament House. Similar proclamations were issued on Friday, 8 February in New South Wales, South Australia, Victoria and Western Australia.

=== Canada ===
The Queen's Privy Council for Canada issued the first proclamation of the Queen's accession, doing so on Wednesday, 6 February. It was read at Rideau Hall, in both French and English.

=== Ceylon ===
In Ceylon, the Queen was proclaimed separately as the Queen of Ceylon through a proclamation signed by the Governor-General and the members of the Cabinet. On the morning of February 8, 1952, this proclamation was read from the steps of Parliament House, Colombo in three principal languages of Ceylon: English, Sinhalese and Tamil, to the large crowds outside. A gun-salute was also fired. The bands played God Save The Queen and Namo Namo Matha.

=== New Zealand ===
The Governor-General of New Zealand, Sir Bernard Freyberg, proclaimed the Queen's accession in New Zealand on Monday, 11 February, attended by the Chief Justice, Sir Humphrey O'Leary, Deputy Prime Minister Keith Holyoake, and members of the Executive Council, who took the oath of allegiance after the ceremony. The proclamation was signed by the Governor-General, the members of the Executive Council and others.

=== Pakistan ===
In Pakistan, the proclamation on 8 February was surrounded by some of the old splendours of the former Imperial times. A salute of 21 guns was also fired.

The Proclamation of Queen Elizabeth II was contained in a Gazette Extraordinary issued in Karachi on 8 February. It was signed by the Secretary to the Government of Pakistan, and was shorter than those issued in other Commonwealth realms, simply stating, "The Governor-General proclaims that Her Majesty Queen Elizabeth the Second is now become Queen of Her Realms and Territories and Head of the Commonwealth."

=== South Africa ===
The Governor-General of the Union of South Africa, Ernest George Jansen, proclaimed the Queen's accession in Cape Town on Thursday, 7 February, in English and in Afrikaans.

== Crown colonies ==
In Bermuda, Governor Alexander Hood read the proclamation of the Queen's accession from a small dais near the steps of the Public Buildings on 8 February. The ceremony, witnessed by a crowd of several thousand people, concluded by playing of the National Anthem, and then a 21-gun salute at Hamilton harbour. When the salute was over, the Governor called for "three cheers for Her Majesty the Queen", waving his helmet in his right hand.

In Singapore, the proclamation was made by the Governor at a ceremony attended by thousands on the Padang on 9 February 1952.

After the announcement of George VI's death had been formally communicated to the Legislative Board of Turks and Caicos Islands (at that time a dependency of Jamaica, itself then a Crown colony), a proclamation was issued and published there on Friday, 8 February.

Similar proclamations were issued in Southern Rhodesia, on 8 February in Barbados, Cyprus, the Falkland Islands, Grenada, Kenya, Mauritius, Saint Vincent, Seychelles, and Trinidad and Tobago, and on 9 February in Hong Kong, and Sarawak.

== Royal title ==
The proclamation in the United Kingdom marked the first inclusion, by an Accession Council, of the title Head of the Commonwealth, and the first reference to "representatives of other Members of the Commonwealth" as among those proclaiming. Also, the Crown, which had been referred to as the Imperial Crown of Great Britain and Ireland, was also now non-specific, and Elizabeth's title was not her official one. These last two points reflected the existence of the Republic of Ireland (Ireland would not be officially removed from the Queen's title until the year following), as well as the sovereignty of countries over which Elizabeth was now separately queen. However, the Canadian proclamation, necessarily separate due to the country's legal independence from the UK, continued to refer to the new sovereign as Queen of Ireland, and the Crown she inherited as being that of "Great Britain, Ireland and all other His late Majesty's dominions." Elizabeth was also proclaimed Queen of Ireland in South Africa.

Changes of the royal style and title in any realm do not as such change the constitutional status or position of the monarch or the Crown.

== See also ==
- Executive Council (Commonwealth countries)
- Privy council
- Royal Style and Titles Act
- Proclamation of accession of Charles III (2022)
