= Accession Council =

Council proclaiming a new British monarch

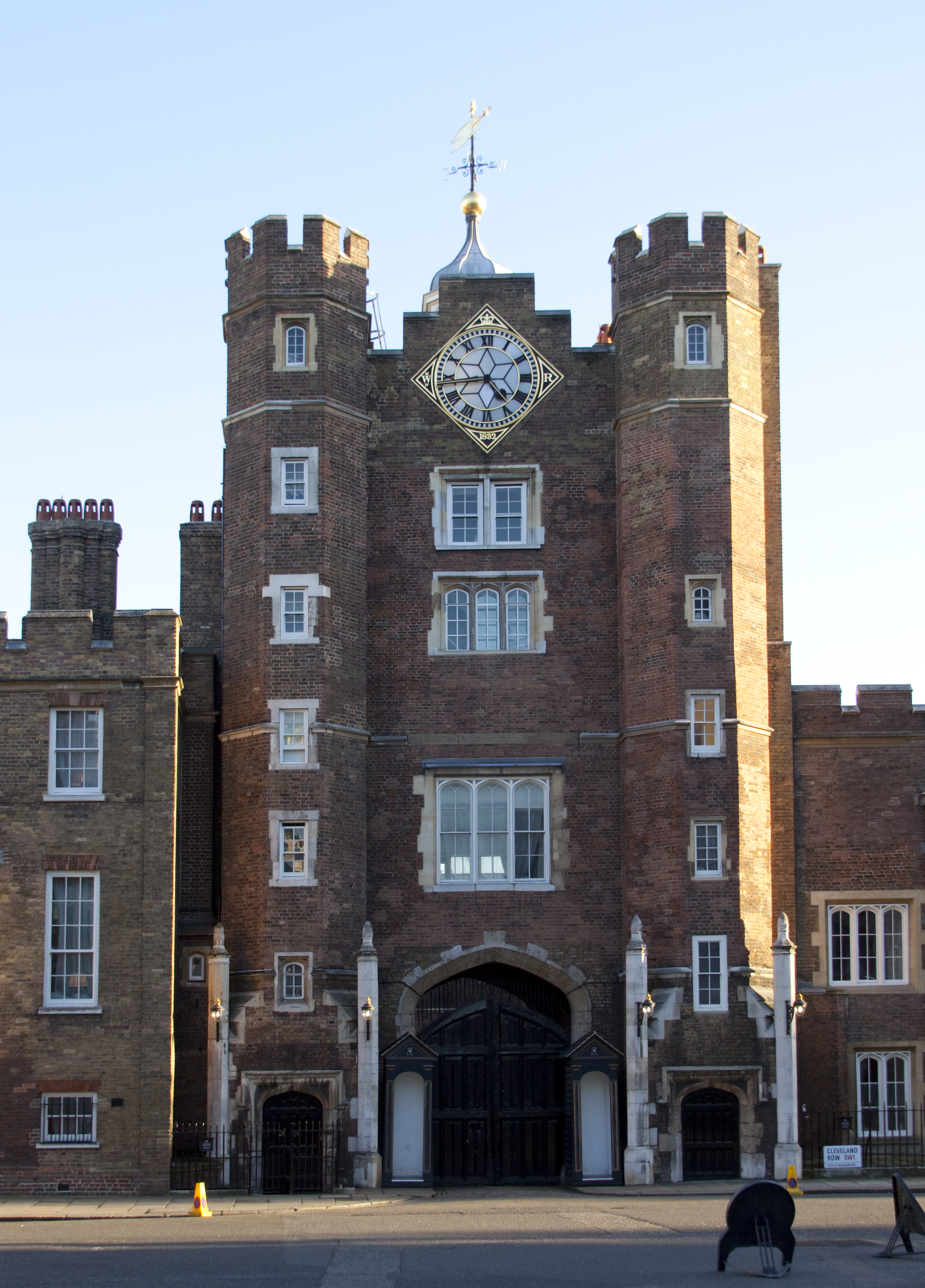
St James's Palace, London, where the Accession Council meets

In the United Kingdom, the Accession Council is a ceremonial body which assembles in St James's Palace in London upon the death of a monarch to make formal proclamation of the accession of the successor to the throne. Under the terms of the Act of Settlement 1701, a new monarch succeeds automatically (demise of the Crown). The proclamation confirms by name the identity of the new monarch, expresses loyalty to the "lawful and rightful Liege Lord", and formally announces the new monarch's regnal name, while the council witnesses the signing and sealing of several documents concerning the accession. The privy council (a subset of the accession council) is then called into the presence of the monarch to hear the monarch's address and the witness monarch's signing and sealing of documents. An Accession Council has confirmed every English (and later, British) monarch since James I in 1603.

== Composition and ceremony ==
The accession council is made up of the following:

- All members of the Privy Council of the United Kingdom; (Note: In 2022, though all 700 members of the Privy Council were eligible to attend the Accession Council, only 200 were summoned due to limitations of space.)
- The High Commissioners of the Commonwealth realms;
- The Lord Mayor and Aldermen of the City of London.

The members of the accession council are summoned to assemble at St. James's Palace and it meets outside the presence chamber of the monarch, where the presiding officer or clerk of the privy council reads out the proclamation, and it is signed by the accession council witnesses. Orders are made with respect to public readings of the proclamation.

Only the privy council is then summoned to attend the monarch, and listen to the monarch's address; the monarch then signs several documents, and the documents are sealed. The two parts of the accession council meeting usually occur together, but if circumstances warrant may take place separately.

== Proclamation ==
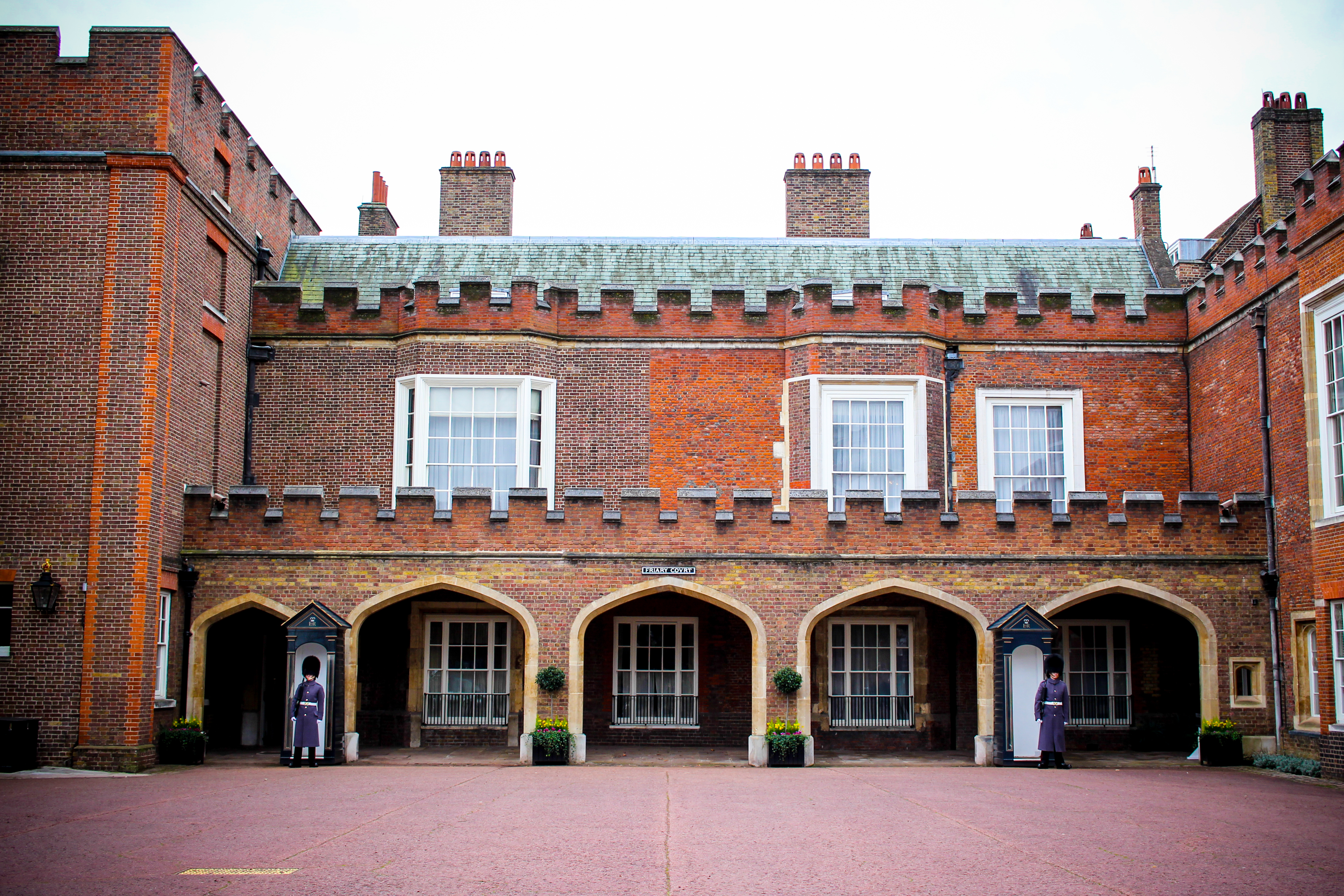
The Proclamation Gallery overlooking Friary Court at St James's Palace, where the proclamation is traditionally first read.

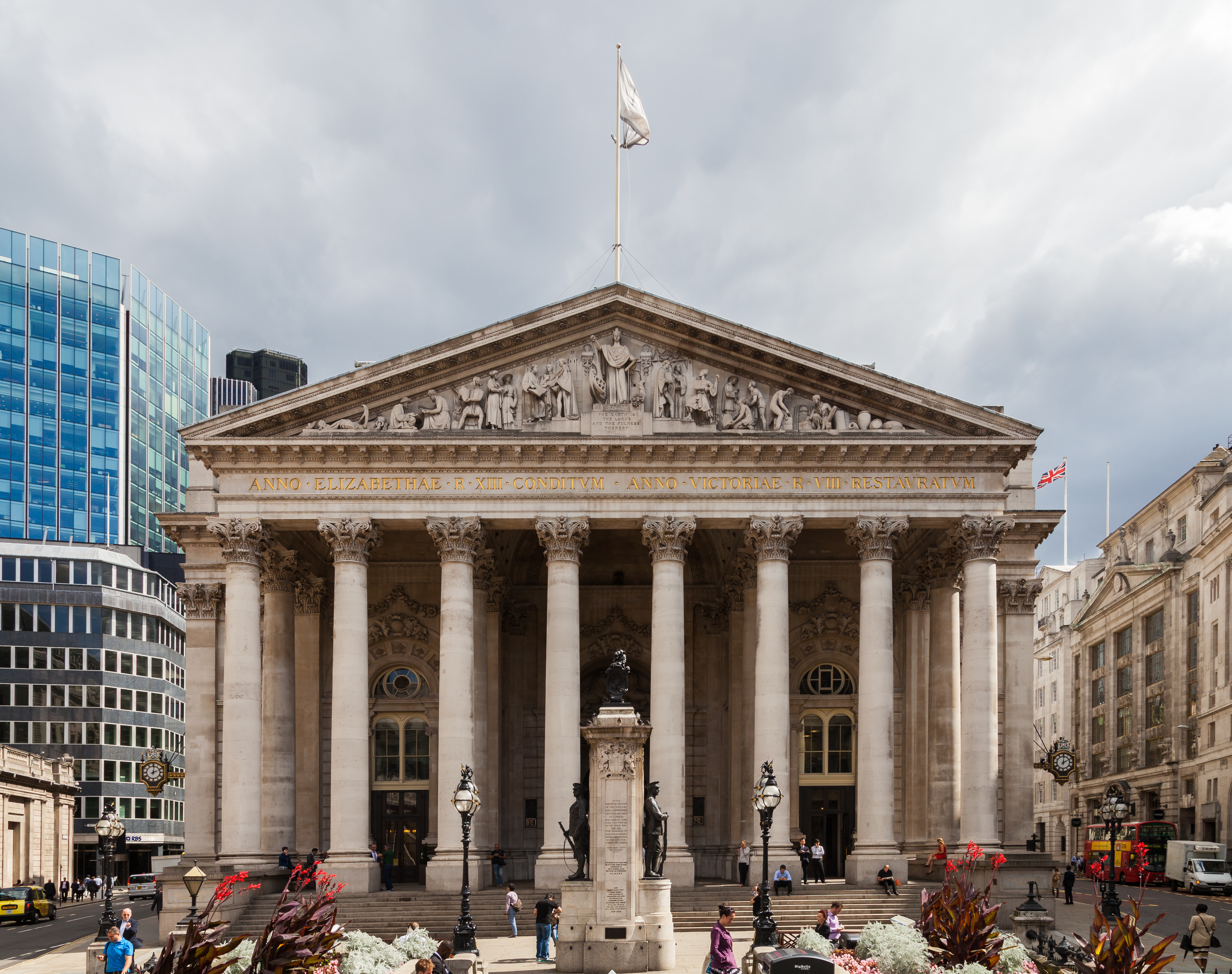
The final public reading in London is on the steps of the Royal Exchange building.

The council's Proclamation of Accession, which confirms the name of the heir, is signed by all the attendant Privy Counsellors.

The 2022 proclamation was:

Whereas it has pleased Almighty God to call to His Mercy our late Sovereign Lady Queen Elizabeth the Second of Blessed and Glorious Memory, by whose Decease the Crown of the United Kingdom of Great Britain and Northern Ireland is solely and rightfully come to The Prince Charles Philip Arthur George:
We, therefore, the Lords Spiritual and Temporal of this Realm and Members of the House of Commons, together with other members of Her late Majesty's Privy Council and representatives of the Realms and Territories, Aldermen and Citizens of London, and others, do now hereby, with one voice and Consent of Tongue and Heart, publish and proclaim that The Prince Charles Philip Arthur George, is now, by the Death of our late Sovereign of Happy Memory, become our only lawful and rightful Liege Lord Charles the Third, by the Grace of God of the United Kingdom of Great Britain and Northern Ireland and of His other Realms and Territories, King, Head of the Commonwealth, Defender of the Faith, to whom we do acknowledge all Faith and Obedience with humble affection; beseeching God by whom Kings and Queens do reign to bless His Majesty with long and happy Years to reign over us.
Given at St. James' Palace this tenth day of September in the year of Our Lord two thousand and twenty-two.

Though proclamations have been worded broadly the same, they also vary as necessary. In the case of Victoria, certain words were included (having regard to section 2 of the Regency Act 1830 prescribing the Oath of Allegiance) which expressly reserved the rights of any child of the late king, William IV, which might be borne to his widow, Adelaide of Saxe-Meiningen. In the case of George VI, the proclamation was reworded because Edward VIII had abdicated, rather than died. The title "Emperor of India," assumed by Queen Victoria well into her reign, was added at the end of the list of titles at the proclamations of Edward VII, George V, Edward VIII and George VI, during whose reign that title was relinquished. In the case of Charles III, the proclamation was reworded to include the House of Commons for the first time. The formula "The King is dead. Long live the King!", of French royal origin, is not part of the official proclamation in the United Kingdom, contrary to popular belief.

The proclamation has been ceremonially read out in various locations around the kingdom. By custom, it is usually first read from the Proclamation Gallery of Friary Court at St James's Palace by the heralds of the College of Arms. Other readings in London have historically followed, concluding at the Royal Exchange in the presence of the Lord Mayor of London. Local proclamation events then occur, such as one at the original location of Mercat Cross in Edinburgh by the heralds of the Court of the Lord Lyon. In 2022, the first reading at the palace was televised live, and other readings in London were omitted except for the one at the Exchange.

== Oaths ==
Under the Acts of Union 1707, monarchs are required upon succeeding to the throne to make an oath to "maintain and preserve" the Church of Scotland. This oath is normally made at the Accession Council. The provision in Article XXV Section II of the Acts of Union 1707 states with respect to confirmed Acts of Scotland:

And further Her Majesty with Advice aforesaid expressly declares and statutes that none of the Subjects of this Kingdom [Scotland] shall be liable to but all and every one of them for ever free of any Oath Test or Subscription within this Kingdom contrary to or inconsistent with the foresaid true Protestant Religion and Presbyterian Church Government Worship and Discipline as above established and that the same within the Bounds of this Church and Kingdom shall never be imposed upon or required of them in any sort And lastly that after the decease of Her present Majesty (whom God long preserve) the Sovereign succeeding to Her in the Royal Government of the Kingdom of Great Britain shall in all time coming at His or Her Accession to the Crown swear and subscribe that they shall inviolably maintain and preserve the foresaid Settlement of the true Protestant Religion with the Government Worship Discipline right and Privileges of this Church as above established by the Laws of this Kingdom in Prosecution of the Claim of Right

Once the monarch makes a sacred oath to the council, the Garter Principal King of Arms steps onto the Proclamation Gallery which overlooks Friary Court to proclaim the new monarch.

Queen Elizabeth II was in Kenya when she acceded to the throne, and the Accession Council therefore met twice, first for the proclamation and again so that the new Queen could take the oath.

Upon accession, a new sovereign is also required to make what is known as the Accession Declaration. This is not usually made at a meeting of the Accession Council but in the presence of Parliament on the first State Opening following the monarch's accession to the throne or at their coronation, whichever occurs first. King George VI made the declaration at his coronation.

== List of accession councils ==
The following is a list of the dates of accession councils and the public reading of proclamations.

Monarch	Predecessor's death or abdication	Accession council	Public proclamation
Victoria	Tuesday 20 June 1837, 02:12	Tuesday 20 June 1837, 11:00	Wednesday 21 June 1837, 10:00
Edward VII	Tuesday 22 January 1901, 18:30	Wednesday 23 January 1901, 14:00	Thursday 24 January 1901, 09:00
George V	Friday 6 May 1910, 23:45	Saturday 7 May 1910, 16:00	Monday 9 May 1910, 09:00
Edward VIII	Monday 20 January 1936, 23:55	Tuesday 21 January 1936, 16:00	Wednesday 22 January 1936, 10:00
George VI	Friday 11 December 1936, 14:00 (Note: George VI came to the throne following the abdication of his brother)	Saturday 12 December 1936, 11:00	Saturday 12 December 1936, 15:00
Elizabeth II	Wednesday 6 February 1952, early hours (Note: George VI died in his sleep during the night of 5–6 February)	Part 1: Wednesday 6 February 1952, 17:00 (Note: Elizabeth II was overseas at the time of her father's death, which meant the two elements of the Accession Council's proceedings were undertaken on different days)	Friday 8 February 1952, 11:00
Elizabeth II	Wednesday 6 February 1952, early hours	Part 2: Friday 8 February 1952, 10:00	Friday 8 February 1952, 11:00
Charles III	Thursday 8 September 2022, 15:10	Saturday 10 September 2022, 10:00	Saturday 10 September 2022, 11:00

== See also ==
- Succession to the British throne
- Accession Declaration Act 1910
- Coronation of Queen Victoria
- Proclamation of accession of George V
- Proclamation of accession of George VI
- Proclamation of accession of Elizabeth II
- Proclamation of accession of Charles III
- Allegiance Council
- Royal Council of the Throne
