= 1936 State Opening of Parliament =

Start of session of UK Parliament

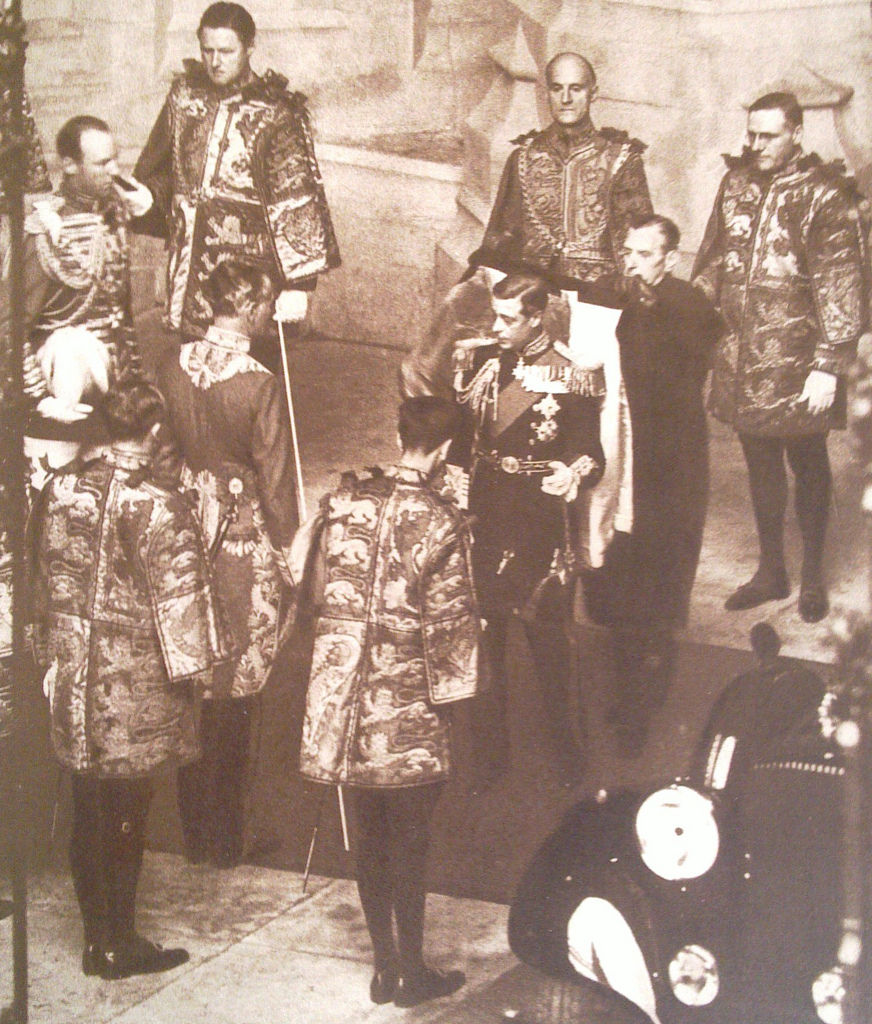
- Edward at the House of Lords before his departure
- Legislative body: Parliament of the United Kingdom
- Meeting place: Palace of Westminster
- Date: 3 November 1936
- Government: National Government (1935–1937)

A State Opening of Parliament of the United Kingdom took place on 3 November 1936. It was the first and only state opening conducted by Edward VIII, who abdicated the following month.

== Events ==
=== Background ===
The 1936 state opening of parliament took place on 3 November 1936. The procession and pageantry were cancelled because of heavy rain. This was the third year in succession that the procession had been cancelled. The 1934 procession was cancelled due to fog and George V drove to parliament, and the 1935 procession was cancelled due to the death of George's sister, Princess Victoria of the United Kingdom. This was the first state opening by an uncrowned monarch since 1911. Edward would have travelled in the Irish State Coach accompanied by the Life Guards. This was the only state opening of parliament conducted by Edward.

=== Journey to and from the Palace of Westminster ===
The news of the cancellation of the pageantry did not deter the several thousand people waiting in crowds along the processional route from Buckingham Palace to the Palace of Westminster. The Daily Telegraph likened the crowds to "two vast serpents, whose shining scales were the black and brown domes of umbrellas." The crowds waited in the pouring rain and cheered Edward as he passed in his car which had the British Royal Standard flying from its roof. As the car passed Marlborough House on The Mall, Edward waved with his right hand to his mother, Queen Mary, who was watching from a first floor window. Edward was accompanied in his car by Henry Somerset, 10th Duke of Beaufort, the Master of the Horse. Edward took off his hat and bowed to The Cenotaph as the car slowly passed it. He arrived at the Victoria Tower at 11:45, his departure having been put back by 18 minutes in the hope that the rain would cease. A gun salute from St. James's Park greeted his arrival. A second car followed Edward to the Palace of Westminster. It contained George Sutherland-Leveson-Gower, 5th Duke of Sutherland, the Lord Steward; Alexander Cambridge, 1st Earl of Athlone, Gold Stick-in-Waiting; Admiral Sir Montague Browning; and Peregrine Cust, 6th Baron Brownlow, Lord-in-waiting, who would have travelled in carriages in the procession behind him. On Edward's return to Buckingham Palace, he was given the Nazi salute by "a number of Germans" as he passed the Cenotaph.

=== The State Opening ===
Edward was attended at the Sovereign's Entrance of the House of Lords by the Portcullis Pursuivant of Arms in Ordinary, Anthony Wagner; the Rouge Croix Pursuivant of Arms in Ordinary, Philip Walter Kerr; the Rouge Dragon Pursuivant of Arms in Ordinary, Eric Neville Geijer; the York Herald, Aubrey Toppin; and the Richmond Herald, Henry Robert Charles Martin.

It was attended by international diplomats; The Times described their attire as featuring "A white turban, the long flowing plume that came from a gold-braided toque, a picturesque robe of Arabia, and the dark fez of another Minister ...". Edward wore his Full Dress as Admiral of the Fleet for the opening. Edward was accompanied by his brothers, Prince Albert, Duke of York, Prince Henry, Duke of Gloucester and Prince George, Duke of Kent. The Cap of Maintenance was carried by James Stanhope, 7th Earl Stanhope, Lawrence Dundas, 2nd Marquess of Zetland held the Sword of State and Charles Vane-Tempest-Stewart, 7th Marquess of Londonderry carried the Imperial Crown. Edward Wood, 1st Earl of Halifax, the Lord Privy Seal, handed Edward the statutory declaration of his Protestant faith which he was required to read under the Accession Declaration Act 1910. He read aloud the declaration, raised with his right hand a "scarlett-bound Bible to his lips", then signed the declaration and returned the document to Lord Halifax. Edward Colebrooke, 1st Baron Colebrooke stood next to Edward as Master of the Robes. Edward then read his Speech from the throne. The Times described his "clear tones" as "strangely younger than any which had been heard from the Throne in recent years" and that his "Royal demeanour bade one feel that 'in himself was all his state'", a quotation from John Milton's epic poem Paradise Lost. He took 13 minutes to read the speech. United Press International described the speech as rejecting precedent as he frequently used the intimate pronouns "I" and "my" as opposed to the more formal "we" and "ours".

Edward recalled in his memoirs that the state opening would be attended by people who would be "measuring me with more curiosity than the occasion ordinarily warranted", as he knew that government ministers and journalists were aware of his affair with Wallis Simpson through reports in American newspapers. As he sat on the throne to deliver his speech Edward was "suddenly assailed by an almost suffocating odour of mothballs" from the robes that had been taken out of storage to be worn for the occasion. He described his Speech from the throne as "one of monumental dullness ... all very solemn and not a word of it was mine".

The Western Daily Press noted Edward's pronunciation of the word "routes" in his speech as possibly influenced by the military usage of the term, as he pronounced it "rowts". The New York Daily News attributed it to his relationship with Simpson.

A painting of Edward at the Sovereign's Entrance of the Victoria Tower by Edward Halliday at the state opening is in the collection of Belton House in Lincolnshire. It was commissioned by Peregrine Cust, 6th Baron Brownlow, who was Lord-in-waiting to Edward.

=== Presence of Wallis Simpson ===
American newspapers remarked on the possible attendance of Wallis Simpson at the state opening. The Chicago Tribune reported that Simpson was present accompanied by "two women friends" and the New York Daily News likened her presence to a 'Will-o'-the-wisp' with 'Was she there?' and 'Did you see her?' the questions on the "lips of the peers in court dress and the bejewelled peeresses". Associated Press reported that Simpson had stayed at home and received a gift of a "basket of flowers four feet high" and a subsequent delivery of soft drinks from a van that bore the Royal Warrant at her home at Cumberland Terrace.
