= Derek Porter (disambiguation) =

Derek Porter was a rower.

Derek Porter may also refer to:

- Derek Porter (footballer) (born 1936), English footballer
- Derek Porter, character in Meet the Browns (TV series)
