= Proclamation of accession of George V =

Formalities when George V became king

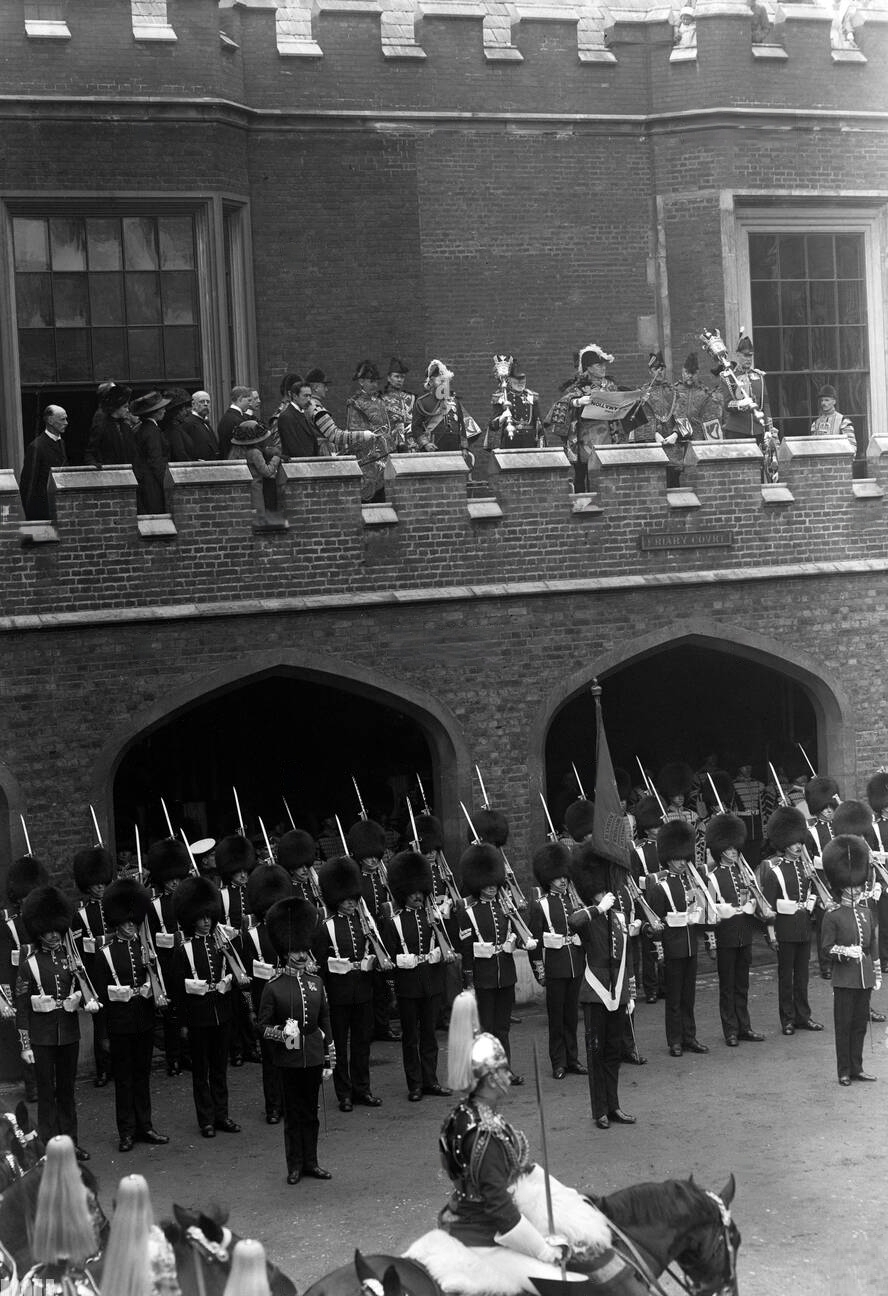
the Royal Proclamation of Accession of King George V, 14 May 1910.

George V was proclaimed King of the United Kingdom and the British Dominions, and Emperor of India, after his father, King Edward VII, died in the late hours of 6 May 1910. He was proclaimed king the following week, the first proclamation taking place on 7 May 1910 at St James's Palace.

== United Kingdom ==
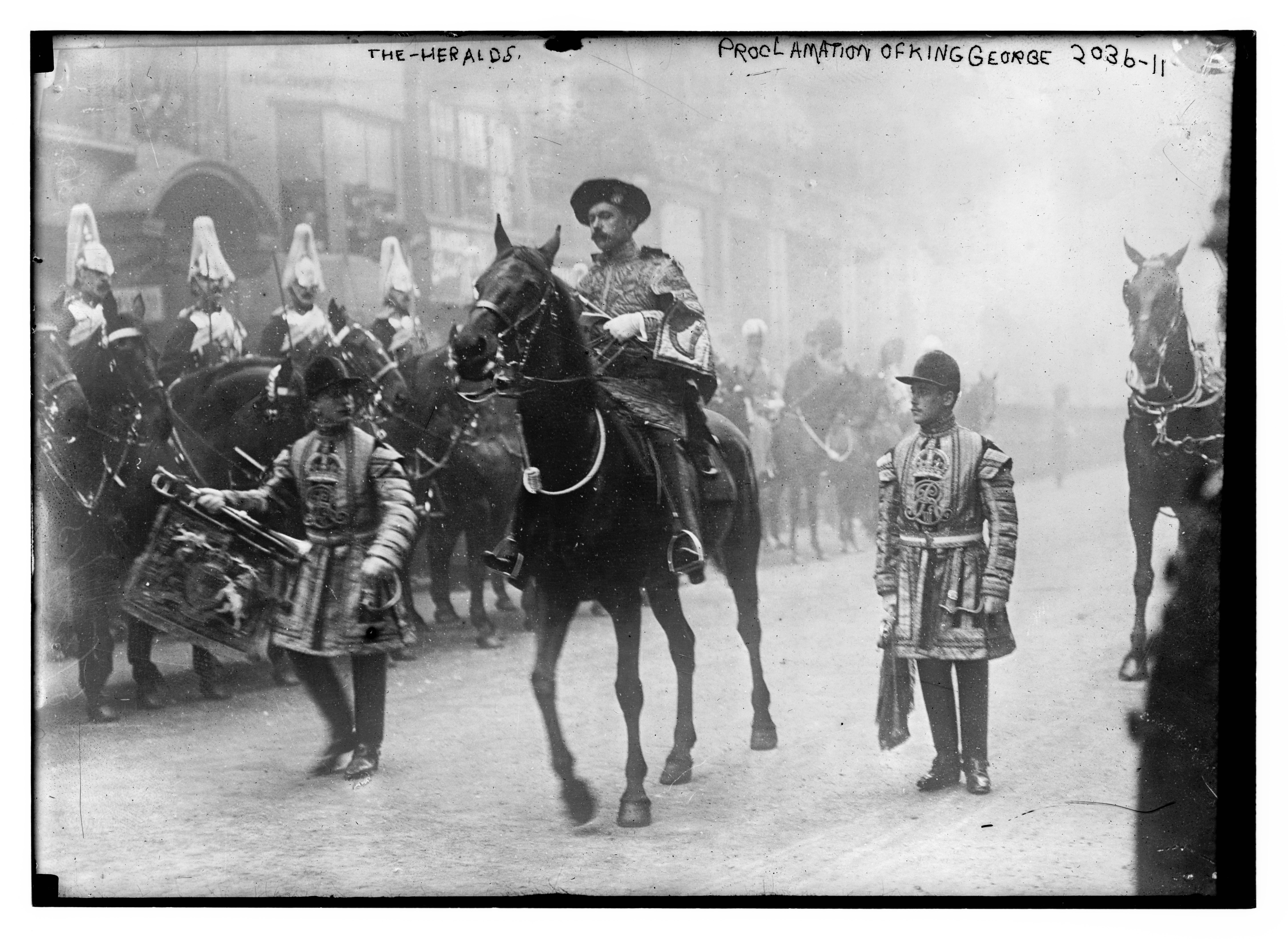
photograph of the Herald on Horseback at Temple Bar, 14 May 1910.

The Lords of the Privy Council met at 4 p.m. on 7 May 1910 at St James's Palace, and gave orders for proclaiming King George V. After the preparations for the proclamation of accession, it had been issued for publication in a supplement to that day's London Gazette:

WHEREAS it has pleased Almighty God to call to His Mercy our late Sovereign Lord King Edward the Seventh, of Blessed and Glorious Memory, by whose Decease the Imperial Crown of the United Kingdom of Great Britain and Ireland is solely and rightfully come to the High and Mighty Prince George Frederick Ernest Albert: We, therefore, the Lords Spiritual and Temporal of this Realm, being here assisted with these of His late Majesty's Privy Council, with Numbers of other Principal Gentlemen of Quality, with the Lord Mayor, Aldermen, and Citizens of London, do now hereby with one Voice and Consent of Tongue and Heart, publish and proclaim, That the High and Mighty Prince George Frederick Ernest Albert, is now, by the Death of our late Sovereign of Happy Memory, become our only lawful and rightful Liege Lord George the Fifth by the Grace of God, King of the United Kingdom of Great Britain and Ireland, and of the British Dominions beyond the Seas, Defender of the Faith, Emperor of India; To whom we do acknowledge all Faith and constant Obedience, with all hearty and humble affection; beseeching God, by whom Kings and Queens do reign, to bless the Royal Prince George the Fifth with long and happy years to reign over Us.

Given at the Court at Saint James's, this seventh day of May, in the year of our Lord one thousand nine hundred and ten.

GOD save the KING.

== Commonwealth of Australia ==
The proclamation in Australia took place at Government House in Melbourne on 9 May.

WHEREAS it has pleased Almighty God to call to His Mercy our Late Sovereign Lord King Edward the Seventh, of blessed and glorious memory, by whose decease the Imperial Crown of the United Kingdom of Great Britain and Ireland and all other His late Majesty's Dominions, is solely and rightfully come to the High and Mighty Prince George Frederick Ernest Albert: We, therefore, William Humble, Earl of Dudley, Governor-General and Commander-in-Chief of the Commonwealth of Australia; Andrew Fisher, Prime Minister, and His Majesty's Treasurer of the said Commonwealth; and Egerton Lee Batchelor, Minister of State for External Affairs of the said Commonwealth, do now hereby, with one full voice and consent of tongue and heart publish and proclaim that the High and Mighty Prince George Frederick Ernest Albert, is now, by the death of our late Sovereign of happy and glorious memory, become our only lawful and rightful Liege Lord, George the Fifth, by the Grace of God, King of the United Kingdom of Great Britain and Ireland, and of the British Dominions beyond the Seas, Defender of the Faith, Emperor of India, Supreme Lord in and over the Commonwealth of Australia, to whom we do acknowledge all faith and constant obedience, with all hearty and humble affection, beseeching God, by whom Kings and Queens do reign, to bless the Royal Prince GEORGE THE FIFTH with long and happy years to reign over us.

GIVEN at Government House, Melbourne, this ninth day of May, in the Year of Our Lord one thousand nine hundred and ten, and in the first year of His Majesty's reign.

GOD SAVE THE KING!
