= George McMahon (failed assassin) =

Scottish journalist and assassin (c.1902 – 1970)

- Born: Jerome Bannigan c. 1902; Govan, Lanarkshire, Scotland
- Died: 1970
- Known for: Attempted assassination of King Edward VIII at the 1936 Trooping the Colour ceremony
- Convictions: Unlawfully possessing a firearm and ammunition to endanger life
- Penalty: 12 months' imprisonment with hard labour

Details
- Date: 16 July 1936
- Locations: Hyde Park, London
- Target: King Edward VIII of the United Kingdom
- Weapon: Revolver
- Date apprehended: 16 July 1936

George Andrew Campbell McMahon (c.1902 – 1970), also known as Jerome Bannigan, was convicted for his failed assassination attempt against King Edward VIII of the United Kingdom at Hyde Park in London in 1936.

== Early life and career ==
McMahon was born as Jerome Bannigan in Govan, on the outskirts of Glasgow, Scotland. His parents were natives of County Tyrone, Ireland. He was a keen footballer in his youth until he suffered a hip injury at the age of twelve.

Bannigan relocated to London from around 1926 and engaged in social work. He began to pass on information to Scotland Yard.

Bannigan changed his name to George Andrew Campbell McMahon from 1933. McMahon was a low-level fraudster and gun-runner to Abyssinia when he came to the Italians' attention. They offered him cash for information about armaments.

He was a paid informant for the Security Service (later MI5) by 1935.

== 1936 incident ==
On 16 July 1936, as Edward VIII rode through Hyde Park, following the Colour ceremony, McMahon produced a revolver.

Bystanders—including a Mrs Alice Lawrence, who was standing next to McMahon—and members of the Metropolitan Police reportedly subdued McMahon, after a struggle, during which the unfired revolver fell near the king's horse as it continued down Constitution Hill.

McMahon later stated in a 40-page document entitled "He Was My King" that he was hired by the Italian embassy in London to kill the King, but he deliberately botched the assassination attempt. His attempts to contact the security service and the Home Office had failed.

McMahon was subsequently sentenced to 12 months' imprisonment with hard labour on 14 September 1936, for possessing a firearm with intent to endanger life.
