= Edward Halliday =

British painter (1902–1984)

- Born: 7 October 1902; Garston, Liverpool, England
- Died: 2 February 1984 (aged 81); London, England
- Education: Liverpool College of Art, Académie Colarossi, Royal College of Art, British School at Rome
- Known for: painting, portraiture, radio/television host

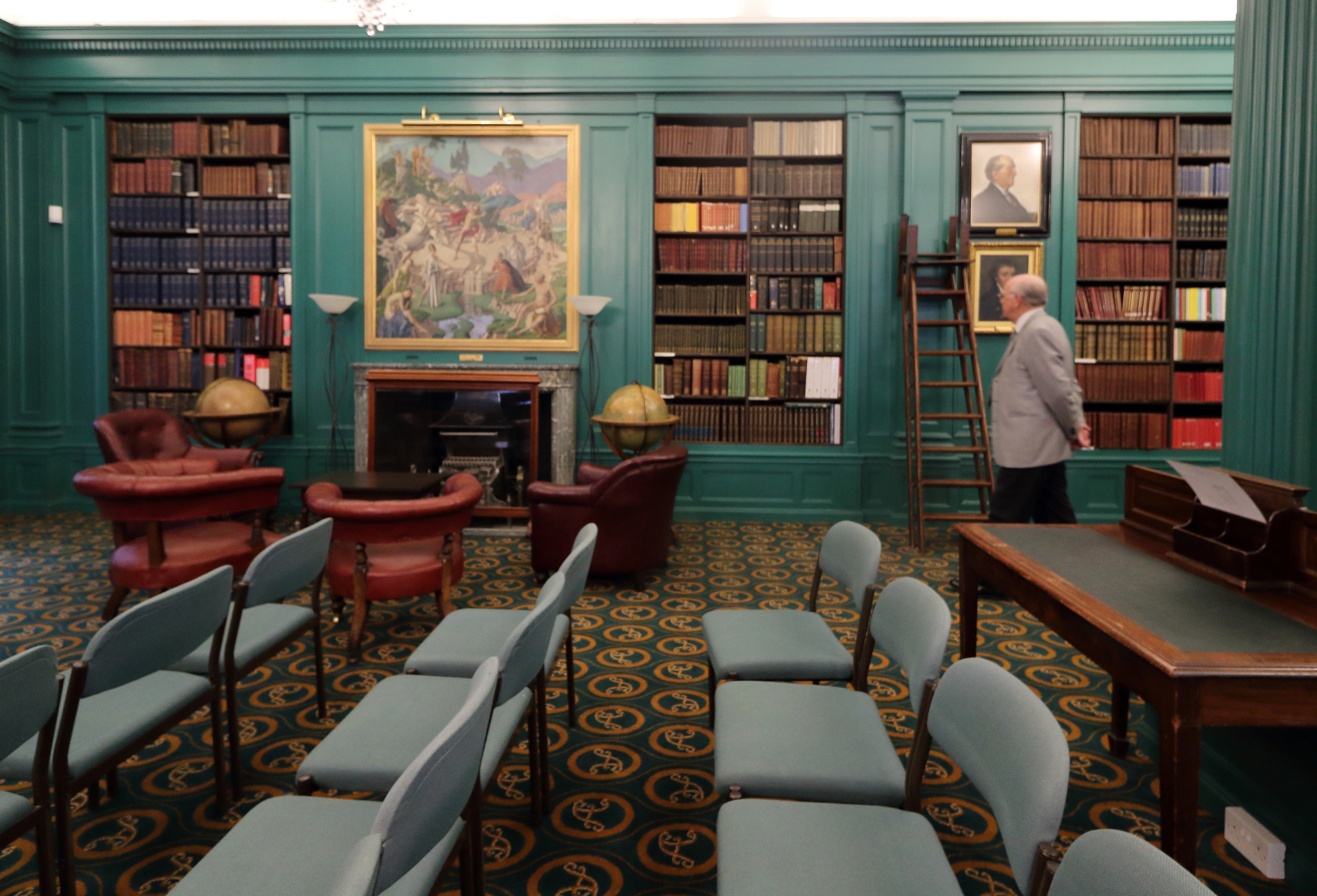
Liverpool Athenaeum with one of three murals (1928) depicting the goddess Athena by Edward Halliday

Edward Irvine Halliday CBE (1902–1984) was a British painter, known for his portraits and his murals in the 1920s. He also worked in television and radio as a host.

== About ==
Edward Irvine Halliday was born on 7 October 1902 in Garston, Liverpool, to James Halliday and Violet Irvine. He first attended Liverpool College of Art. Halliday continued his studies and attended life drawing classes at Académie Colarossi (1922–1923), the Royal College of Art (1923–1925), and the British School at Rome (1925–1928). He was awarded the Prix de Rome for Decorative Painting in 1925.

He established himself as a portrait artist with his work, Lord Darling (1928).

During World War II, Halliday served in the Royal Air Force in Bomber Command. After the war in 1948, he received a painting commission for a portrait of Princess Elizabeth from the Drapers' Company of London. This was the start of many more royal portrait commissions. Other sitters for Halliday's portraits included Winston Churchill, Edmund Hillary, Lord Denning, Lord Widgery, Louis Gluckstein, Robert Stopford, Lord Hunt, Frank Whittle, Malcolm Sargent, Leon Goossens, Beryl Grey, Gladys Cooper, Wally Hammond, Brian Johnston, and Ben Travers. In 1967 he was commissioned to paint the retirement portrait of Derek R Wigram, Headmaster of Monkton Combe School, which hangs in the school's dining hall.

Halliday had two arts series radio programs, Artists at Work (1932) and Design in Modern Life (1934). The success of these radio programmes led to further radio and television work. In the 1950s, Halliday was the voice behind the BBC Television Newsreel.

== Death and legacy ==
He died at his London home in St John's Wood, on 2 February 1984. His daughter Charlotte Halliday is a painter.

Halliday's work is in many public museum collections including National Portrait Gallery, London, National Maritime Museum, Bank of England Museum, Parliamentary Art Collection, among others.
