= David Smeeton =

English journalist

- Born: 16 September 1936; Gillingham, Kent, England
- Died: 15 January 2020 (aged 83); Mandurah, Western Australia, Australia
- Occupation: Journalist
- Years active: 1955–1994
- Spouse: Diana Mary Pitts (m. 1959; death 1994)
- Children: 2

David Smeeton (16 September 1936 – 15 January 2020) was an English journalist. He began his career as a reporter for the Western Morning News and then joined BBC South West as a regional reporter. Smeeton became a general news reporter for BBC London in 1963, was promoted to education reporter and then became the BBC's first education correspondent in 1968. He was BBC News's home affairs correspondent in 1970 and was appointed the corporation's Tokyo correspondent in 1973. Smeeton was the education and local government correspondent from 1978 and was the BBC's correspondent in Bonn, West Germany between 1981 and 1986 before becoming the west of England correspondent for BBC South West between 1986 and 1994.

== Early life ==
Smeeton was born into a naval family on 16 September 1936 in Gillingham, Kent. He was the only son of the school matron Enid Mona (née Brockman) and the naval officer Donald Edward Smeeton. He had two uncles who were vice-admirals: Ronald Brockman, a wartime secretary to Lord Mountbatten, the First Sea Lord, and Richard Smeeton, the Deputy Supreme Allied Commander Atlantic during the Cold War. When Smeeton was three, his father died following the sinking of HMS Glorious and her two escort vessels off Narvik in the Norwegian campaign of the Second World War. He and his younger sister resided with his grandparents during the war. Smeeton attended Malvern College, Worcestershire. He hoped to follow his family into the navy but failed the examination for Royal Naval College, Dartmouth because of a heart complaint.

== Career ==
Instead, Smeeton decided to go for a career in journalism. In 1955, he joined the Western Morning News newspaper as a reporter in Plymouth and continued working there until 1960. From 1960 to 1963, Smeeton worked as a regional reporter for BBC South West in Plymouth. He made a live radio broadcast from Goonhilly Downs, Cornwall for the switch-on the Telstar 1 satellite in July 1962. Smeeton joined BBC London as a general news reporter in 1963. In 1965, he was promoted to education reporter and then became the BBC's first education correspondent in 1968. That same year saw Smeeton earn a Winston Churchill travelling fellowship to North America and studied techniques in educational broadcasting in Canada and the United States. He also wrote a 13-part series on Future Education for UNESCO.

He was made home affairs correspondent for BBC News in 1970, and became the corporation's Tokyo correspondent for the BBC World Service and domestic outlets such as BBC Radio 4's From Our Own Correspondent in 1973. Smeeton covered the wider Far East, which included countries such as China, North Korea, the Philippines and Vietnam. In 1975, he reported from the American base on the Pacific island of Guam, where thousands of evacuated Vietnamese boat people were being processed before their resettlement in the United States. Smeeton covered the first visit to China by Anthony Crosland, the Foreign Secretary, in 1977. Following half a decade in Tokyo, he went back to London, and was replaced by Bob Friend. Smeeton was the education and local government correspondent from 1978 to 1981. He later became the BBC's correspondent in Bonn, West Germany between 1981 and 1986. Smeeton reported on many Cold War stories and interviewed public figures such as Willy Brandt, the Chancellor of West Germany, and Franz Josef Strauss, the minister-president of Bavaria.

His posting to Bonn ended in 1986 and returned to London after a planned posting to head the BBC's Asian office in Singapore fell through because his wife needed treatment for cancer in London. Smeeton instead was appointed the west of England correspondent for BBC South West in Plymouth. He retired from the BBC in 1994, and went freelance as a broadcaster and journalist. Smeeton relocated to Mandurah, Western Australia in 2010. He provided histories of European and Indigenous Australian settlements to local residents and was an advocate for palliative care.

== Personal life and death ==
From 22 August 1959 to her death in 2014, Smeeton was married to Diana Mary Pitts. There were two children of the marriage; their son was killed in a climbing accident during a holiday in Glencoe, Scotland in April 1987. He died of cancer at his home in Western Australia on 15 January 2020. A celebration of Smeeton's life took place in Mandurah on 29 January 2020.
