= Friary Court =

Part of St James's Palace, London

Coordinates: 51.5044°N 0.1374°W

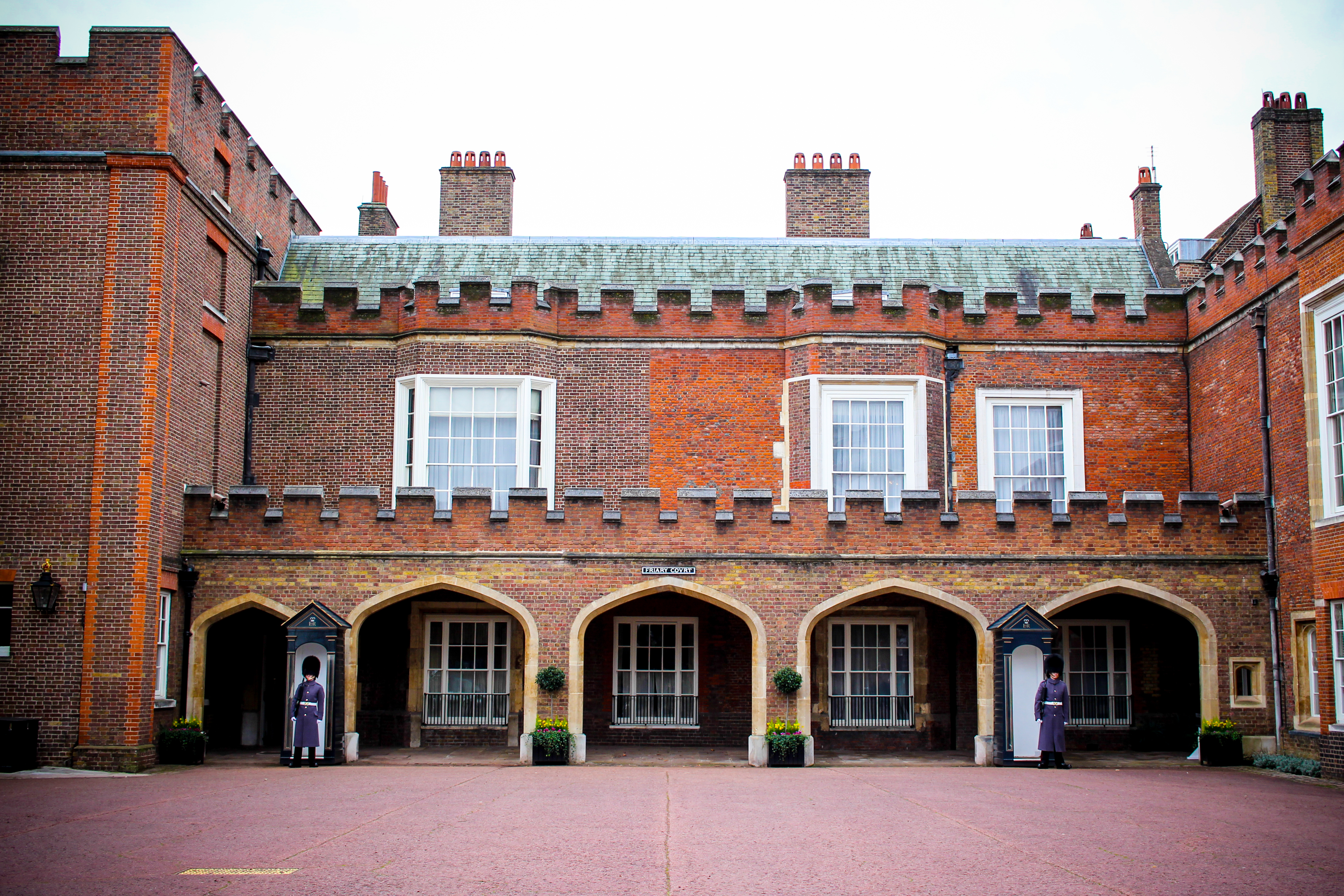
The Proclamation Gallery overlooking Friary Court at St James's Palace in London, where the proclamation of a new monarch is traditionally first read.

Friary Court is a part of St James's Palace in London, England.

It is used after the death of a reigning monarch. The Accession Council meets to declare the new monarch from the deceased monarch's line. Once the monarch has made a sacred oath to the council, the Garter King of Arms steps onto the Proclamation Gallery which overlooks Friary Court to announce the new monarch. Friary Court has also been used in association with several other ceremonial functions, such as the christening of Prince George of Wales in the adjoining Chapel Royal. Aside from ceremonial functions it hosts royal charity events of which the royal family are an integral part.
