= Malcolm Hickman =

English cricketer

Personal information
- Full name: Malcolm Francis Hickman
- Born: 30 June 1936 (age 90); Market Harborough, Leicestershire, England
- Batting: Right-handed

Domestic team information
- Years: Team
- 1954–1957: Leicestershire

Career statistics
Competition	First-class
Matches	12
Runs scored	232
Batting average	11.60
100s/50s	–/–
Top score	40
Balls bowled	–
Wickets	–
Bowling average	–
5 wickets in innings	–
10 wickets in match	–
Best bowling	–
Catches/stumpings	5/–
- Source: Cricinfo, 3 March 2012

Malcolm Francis Hickman (born 30 June 1936) is a former English cricketer. Hickman was a right-handed batsman. He was born at Market Harborough, Leicestershire.

Hickman made his first-class debut for Leicestershire against Glamorgan in the 1954 County Championship. He made eleven further first-class appearances for the county, the last of which came against Kent in the 1957 County Championship. In his twelve first-class appearances for the county, he scored 132 runs at an average of 11.60, with a high score of 40.
