= Derek Porter (footballer) =

English footballer

Personal information
- Date of birth: 22 June 1936
- Place of birth: Ulverston, England
- Date of death: 14 November 2023 (aged 87)
- Position: Winger

Youth career
- Dalton Town

Senior career*
Years	Team	Apps	(Gls)
1957–1959	Barrow	15	(1)
1959–1960	Wigan Athletic	3	(0)
- * Club domestic league appearances and goals

Derek Porter (22 June 1936 – 14 November 2023) was an English footballer who played for Barrow and Wigan Athletic. Porter made three appearances for Wigan in the 1959–60 season of the Lancashire Combination.

After retiring as a player, Porter became a manager. He coached Dalton United during the 1980s, guiding them to two West Lancashire League titles in 1983–84 and 1984–85.
