= Bournemouth typhoid outbreak of 1936 =

Disease outbreak in Bournemouth, England

Bournemouth typhoid outbreak
- Date: August 1936–September 1936
- Location: Bournemouth, Hampshire
- Cause: Typhoid fever
- Outcome: 718 cases
- Deaths: Appx. 70

The Bournemouth typhoid outbreak was an outbreak of typhoid in 1936 in the south coast of England, a traditional holiday location. It occurred during the months of August and September. The first cases were traced to raw milk from a dairy supplied by a farm whose cows drank water from a river contaminated by sewage from a cottage where a typhoid carrier lived. 718 people became infected, including 200 visitors and 518 residents.
