= Accession Declaration Act 1910 =

Act of the Parliament of the United Kingdom

Accession Declaration Act 1910 (Note: Section 2.)
- Act of Parliament
- Parliament of the United Kingdom
- Long title: An Act to alter the form of the Declaration required to be made by the Sovereign on Accession.
- Citation: 10 Edw. 7. & 1 Geo. 5. c. 29
- Territorial extent: United Kingdom

Dates
- Royal assent: 3 August 1910
- Commencement: 3 August 1910 (Note: The Acts of Parliament (Commencement) Act 1793.)
Other legislation
Amends	Bill of Rights 1689; Act of Settlement 1701

Status: Current legislation

Text of statute as originally enacted

Revised text of statute as amended

Text of the Accession Declaration Act 1910 as in force today (including any amendments) within the United Kingdom, from legislation.gov.uk.

The Accession Declaration Act 1910 (10 Edw. 7. & 1 Geo. 5. c. 29) is an act of the Parliament of the United Kingdom that altered the declaration that the Sovereign is required to make at their accession to the throne as first required by the Bill of Rights 1689. (Note: "...And that every King and Queene of this Realme who at any time hereafter shall come to and succeede in the Imperiall Crowne of this Kingdome shall on the first day of the meeting of the first Parlyament next after his or her comeing to the Crowne sitting in his or her Throne in the House of Peeres in the presence of the Lords and Commons therein assembled or at his or her Coronation before such person or persons who shall administer the Coronation Oath to him or her at the time of his or her takeing the said Oath (which shall first happen) make subscribe and audibly repeate the Declaration mentioned in the Statute made in the thirtyeth yeare of the Raigne of King Charles the Second Entituled An Act for the more effectuall Preserveing the Kings Person and Government by disableing Papists from sitting in either House of Parlyament...") In it, they solemnly declare themself to be faithful to the Protestant faith. The altered declaration is as follows:

"I [here insert the name of the Sovereign] do solemnly and sincerely in the presence of God profess, testify, and declare that I am a faithful Protestant, and that I will, according to the true intent of the enactments which secure the Protestant succession to the Throne of my Realm, uphold and maintain the said enactments to the best of my powers according to law."

This declaration differs from the original one in that it places emphasis on the sovereign being a Protestant, whereas the previous wording placed emphasis on denunciation of Catholicism. This had been seen as offensive to Catholic individuals. The declaration is usually made either at the opening of the first parliament of the new monarch's reign (i.e. during the State Opening of Parliament) or if earlier, as in the cases of George VI and Charles III, at their coronation.

== Background ==
The Bill of Rights of 1689 required, among other things, that any monarch succeeding to the throne take the declaration as laid out by the Test Act 1678; (Note: Referred to in the bill as "...Act for the more effectuall Preserveing the Kings Person and Government by disableing Papists from sitting in either House of Parlyament...")Reiterated by section 2 of the Act of Settlement 1701. The form of the declaration was:

I, A. B., by the grace of God King (or Queen) of England, Scotland, France and Ireland, Defender of the Faith, do solemnly and sincerely in the presence of God, profess, testify, and declare, that I do believe that in the Sacrament of the Lord's Supper there is not any Transubstantiation of the elements of bread and wine into the Body and Blood of Christ at or after the consecration thereof by any person whatsoever: and that the invocation or adoration of the Virgin Mary or any other Saint, and the Sacrifice of the Mass, as they are now used in the Church of Rome, are superstitious and idolatrous. And I do solemnly in the presence of God profess, testify, and declare that I do make this declaration, and every part thereof, in the plain and ordinary sense of the words read unto me, as they are commonly understood by English Protestants, without any such dispensation from any person or authority or person whatsoever, or without thinking that I am or can be acquitted before God or man, or absolved of this declaration or any part thereof, although the Pope, or any other person or persons, or power whatsoever, should dispense with or annul the same or declare that it was null and void from the beginning".

The declaration, in that form, was originally administered under the Test Acts to all civil and military officials of the Crown, including the monarch him/herself (starting with William III and Mary II). Following Catholic emancipation, the law was changed to require only the monarch (who remained Supreme Head of the Church of England) to take the oath. However, when Edward VII took the throne, he was unhappy at the pointedly anti-Catholic wording of the oath (viewing it as outdated and unnecessarily offensive to Catholics, of whom he had several in his private social circle), and wished to have it changed before the next succession. When he died in 1910, his successor, George V, who agreed with his father's sentiments, made it known that he would refuse to open parliament as long as he was obliged to make the declaration in its then-current form. Prime Minister H. H. Asquith agreed with the King, and the Act was passed through the then-sitting parliament before the new King was required to open the new parliament.

== See also ==
- Accession Council
- Coronation Oath Act 1688
- Succession to the British throne
- Test Act
