= St James's Palace =

Royal palace in London, England

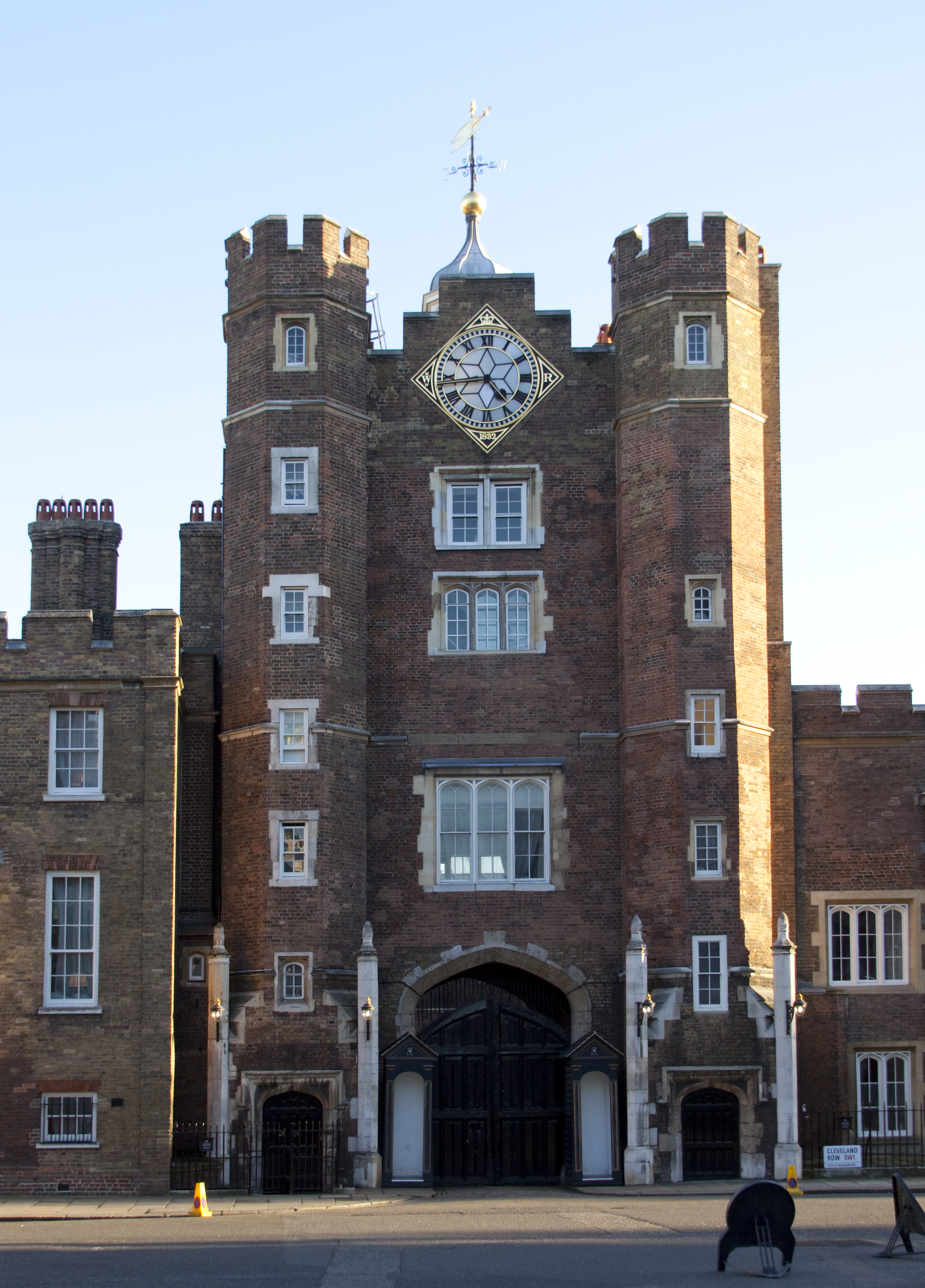
- The north gatehouse, main entrance of St James's Palace in Pall Mall

General information
- Architectural style: Tudor
- Location: London, England
- Coordinates: 51°30′17″N 00°08′16″W
- Construction started: 1531; 495 years ago
- Completed: 1536; 490 years ago
- Client: Henry VIII
- Owner: King Charles III in right of the Crown

Listed Building – Grade I
- Official name: St James's Palace, Garden Walls, Marlborough Gate, etc.
- Designated: 5 February 1970
- Reference no.: 1264851

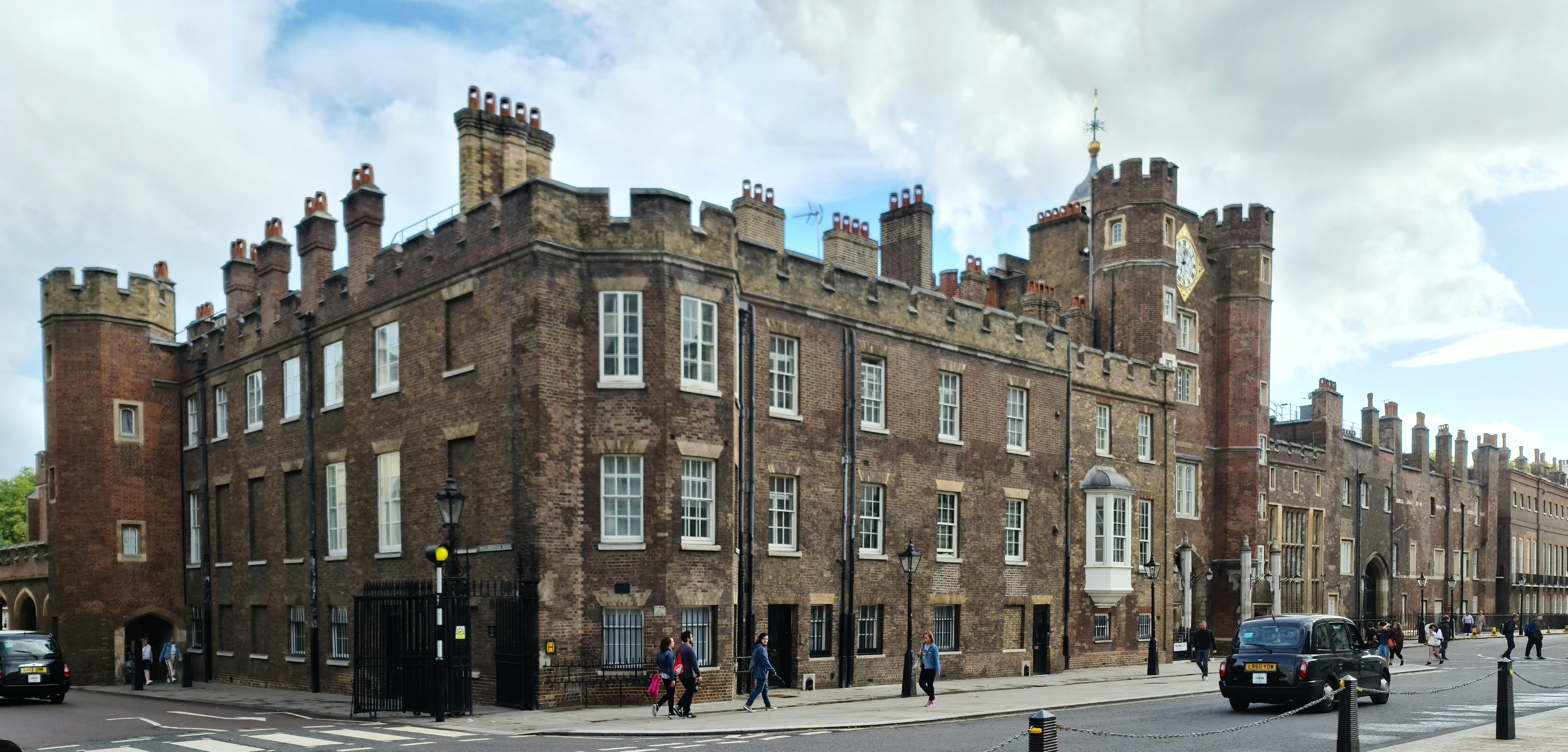
St James's Palace, built in the 16th century by Henry VIII, remains the senior royal palace in London.

St James's Palace is a royal palace in London, England. The palace gives its name to the Court of St James's, which is the monarch's royal court, and is located in the City of Westminster. Although no longer the principal residence of the monarch, it is the ceremonial meeting place of the Accession Council, the office of the Marshal of the Diplomatic Corps, and the London residence of several members of the royal family.

Built by order of King Henry VIII in the 1530s on the site of an isolated leper hospital dedicated to Saint James the Less, the palace was secondary in importance to the Palace of Whitehall for most Tudor and Stuart monarchs. Initially surrounded by a deer park and gardens, it was generally used as a hunting lodge and as a retreat from the formal court and occasionally as a royal guest house. After the Palace of Whitehall burned down, the palace took on administrative functions for the monarchy. It increased in importance during the reigns of the Hanoverian monarchs but began to be displaced by Buckingham Palace in the early 19th century. After decades of being used increasingly only for formal occasions, the move was formalised by Queen Victoria in 1837.

The palace now houses a number of offices and official societies and collections. All ambassadors and high commissioners to the United Kingdom are still accredited to the Court of St James's. The palace's Chapel Royal is still used for functions of the British royal family. Official receptions are also regularly hosted at the palace.

The palace was built mainly between 1531 and 1536 in red brick, and its architecture is primarily Tudor in style. The Queen's Chapel was added in the 1620s, and Clarence House was built on palace grounds directly next to the Palace in the 1820s. A fire in 1809 destroyed parts of the palace, including the monarch's private apartments, which were never replaced. Some 17th-century interiors survive, but most were remodelled in the 19th century. The palace is a Grade I listed building.

== History ==
=== Tudors ===
The palace was commissioned by Henry VIII on the remote site of a former leper hospital dedicated to Saint James the Less. (Note: The uncertainty as to which Saint James was intended is expressed in the 1874 work Old and New London, where the author refers to the dedication as to "St. James the Less, Bishop of Jerusalem". James the Just, brother of Jesus, was referred to as Bishop of Jerusalem, not James the Less.) He first used it as a hunting lodge for his newly enclosed deer park, St. James's Park. The new palace, secondary in the king's interest to Whitehall Palace, was constructed between 1531 and 1536 as a smaller residence to escape formal court life.

Much smaller than the nearby Whitehall, it is arranged around four courtyards: the Colour Court, the Ambassador's Court, the Engine Court and the Friary Court. These remain enclosed except for Friary Court, which in modern times is only enclosed by apartments on three sides, the fourth being open to Marlborough Road to accommodate public gatherings. The most recognisable feature of the palace is the north gatehouse; constructed with four storeys, the gatehouse has two crenellated flanking octagonal towers at its corners, and a central clock dominating the uppermost floor and gable; the clock is a later addition and dates from 1731, refurbished 1834. The palace is decorated with the initials H.A. for Henry and his second wife, Anne Boleyn. Henry had the palace constructed in red brick, with detail picked out in darker brick.

The palace was remodelled in 1544, with ceilings painted by Hans Holbein and was described as a "pleasant royal house". Two of Henry VIII's children died at the palace, Henry FitzRoy, 1st Duke of Richmond and Somerset, and Mary I. Elizabeth I often resided at the palace, and is said to have spent the night there while waiting for the Spanish Armada to sail up the Channel.

=== Stuarts ===
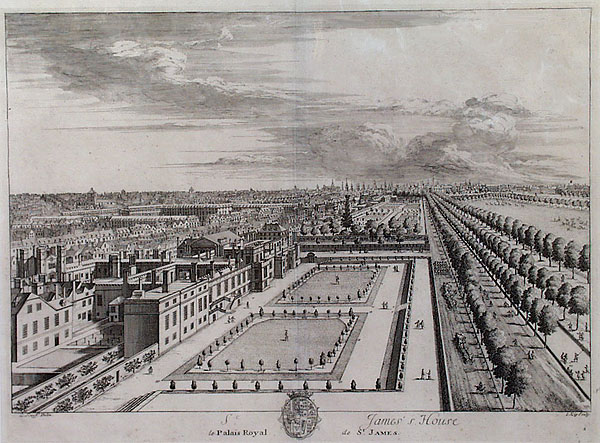
St James's Palace, left, and The Mall, 1715

Prince Henry, Prince of Wales, the eldest son of King James and Anne of Denmark, lived at St James's Palace until his death in 1612. The gardens were improved for him by Alphonsus Fowle. A riding school, one of the first in England, was built for Henry at St James's Palace between 1607 and 1609, and then a library with sculptural decoration by Maximilian Colt. Henry also installed a menagerie with pet birds including a pair of ostriches.

Charles II was born at the palace on 29 May 1630; his parents were Charles I, who ruled the three kingdoms of England, Scotland and Ireland, and Henrietta Maria, the sister of the French king Louis XIII. James II, the second surviving son of King Charles I and Henrietta Maria, was born at the palace on 14 October 1633.

In 1638, Charles I gave the palace to Marie de Medici, the mother of Henrietta Maria. Marie remained in the palace for three years, but the residence of a Catholic former queen of France proved unpopular with parliament and she was soon asked to leave for Cologne. Charles spent his final night at the palace before his execution. Oliver Cromwell then took it over, and turned it into barracks during the English Commonwealth period.

The palace was restored by Charles II following the demise of the Commonwealth, landscaping St James's Park at the same time. Mary II and Anne, Queen of Great Britain, were both born at the palace. It became the principal residence of the monarch in London in 1698, during the reign of William III, after Whitehall Palace was destroyed by fire, and became the administrative centre of the monarchy, a role it retains, in part. Also, at the time of the loss of Whitehall, the Chapel Royal moved its base into the castle chapel at St. James's Palace.

=== Hanoverians ===
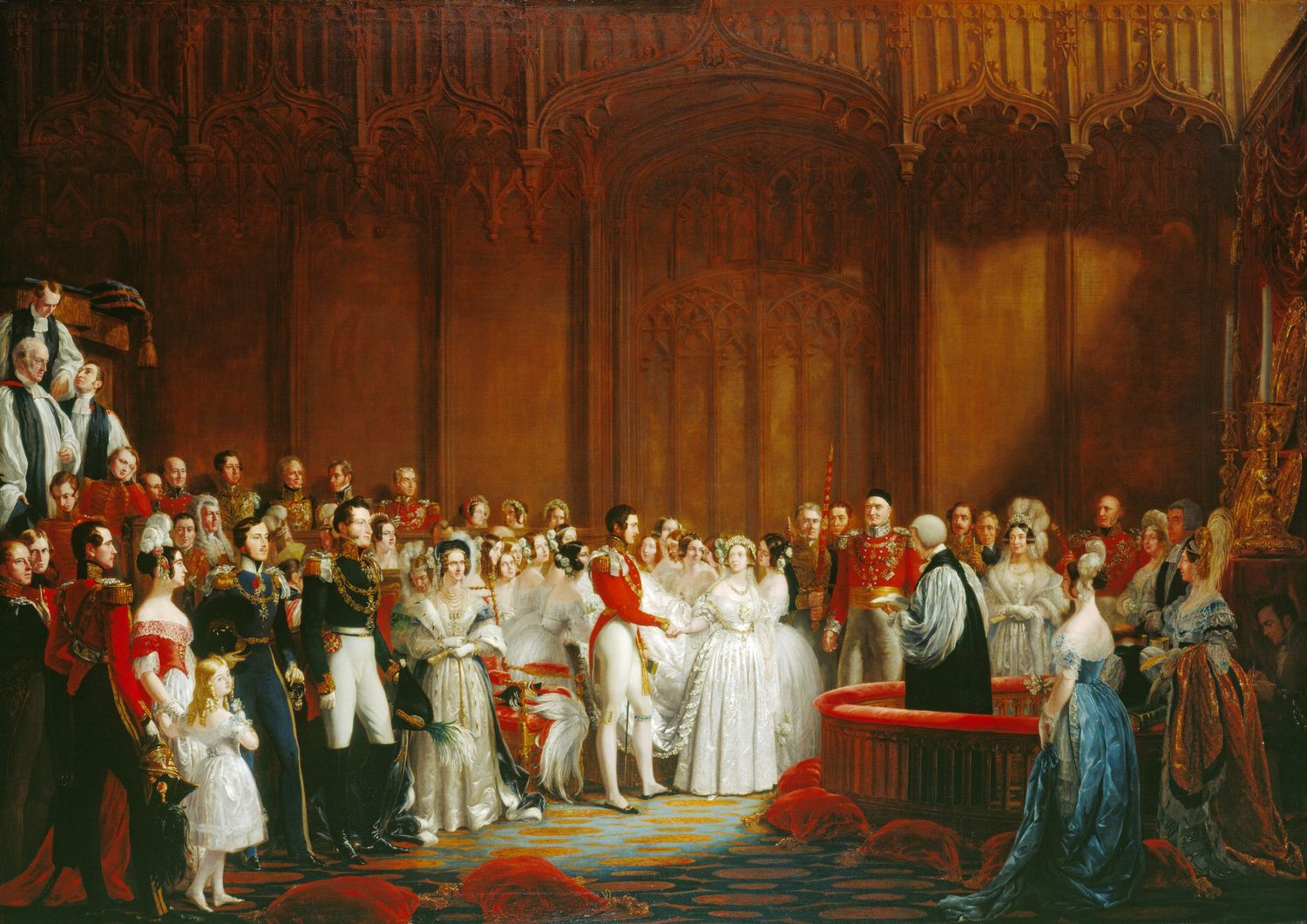
Queen Victoria's wedding to Prince Albert in the Chapel Royal, St James's Palace, painting by George Hayter, 1842

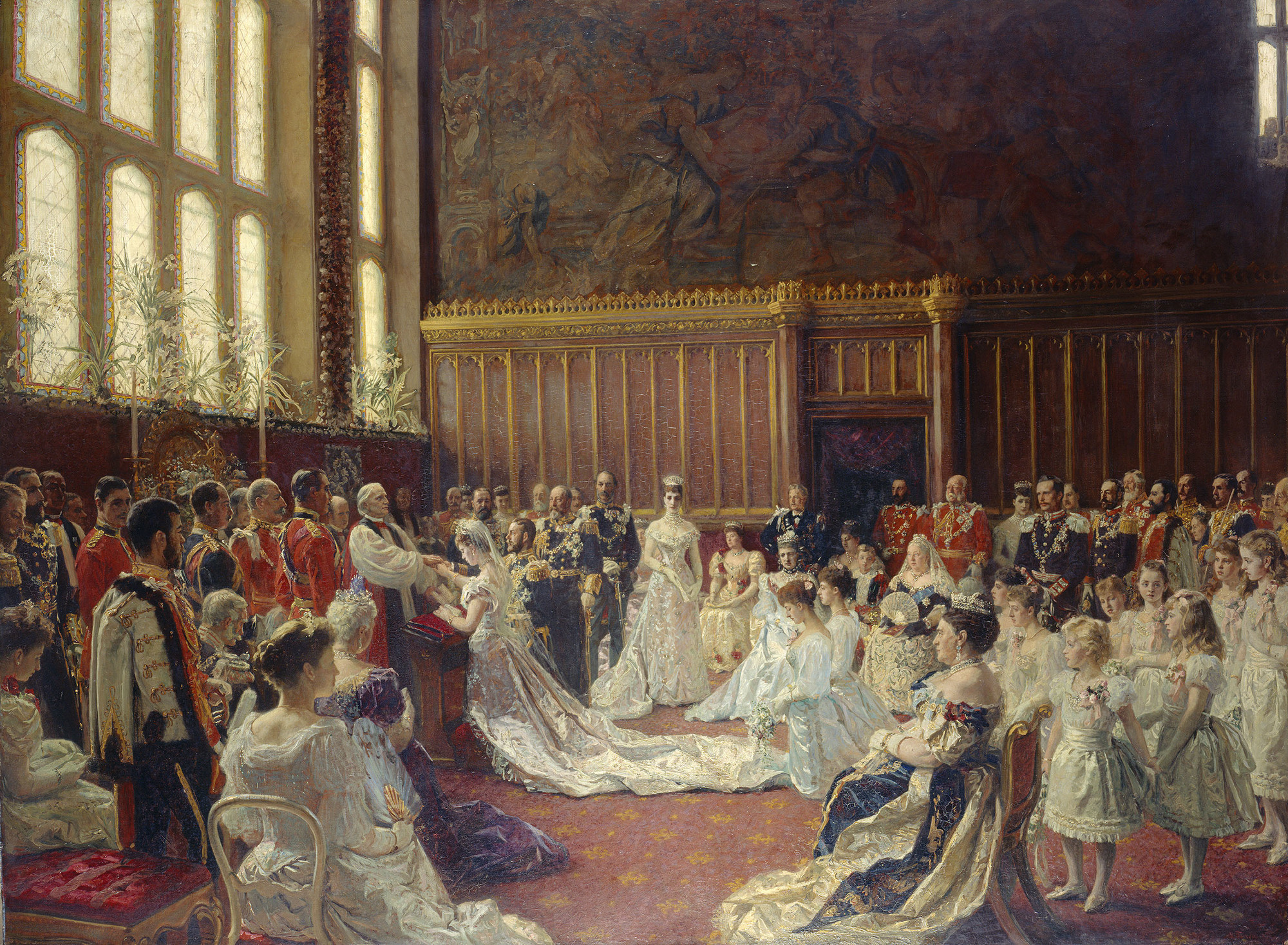
The Chapel Royal, St James's Palace, showing the marriage of the future King George V (1893), by Laurits Tuxen. Royal Collection.

The first two monarchs of the House of Hanover used St James's Palace as their principal London residence. George I and George II both housed their mistresses, the Duchess of Kendal and the Countess of Suffolk respectively, at the palace. In 1757, George II donated the Palace library to the British Museum; this gift was the first part of what later became the Royal Collection.

George III found the palace unsuitable. It was located in a built-up area that did not afford its residents enough privacy, or the space to withdraw from the court into family life. In 1762, shortly after his wedding, George purchased Buckingham House – the predecessor to Buckingham Palace – for his queen, Charlotte of Mecklenburg-Strelitz.

In 1809, a fire destroyed part of St James's Palace, including the monarch's private apartments at the south-east corner. These apartments were not replaced, leaving the Queen's Chapel isolated from the rest of the palace by an open area, where Marlborough Road now runs between the two buildings. The royal family began spending the majority of their time at Buckingham House, with St James's used for only formal occasions; thrice-weekly levées and public audiences were still held there. In the late 18th century, George III refurbished the state apartments but neglected the living quarters. The last monarch to take up residence at the palace, at least part of the year, was William IV. He had earlier built Clarence House on adjacent palace grounds and connected to the palace. Queen Victoria formalised the move to Buckingham in 1837, ending the status of St James's Palace as the primary residence of the monarch; during her reign, the Palace became the venue for courts, levees and other ceremonies. It was nevertheless where Victoria married her husband, Prince Albert, in 1840, and where, eighteen years later, their eldest child, Princess Victoria married her husband, Prince Frederick of Prussia.

St James's Palace in 1819
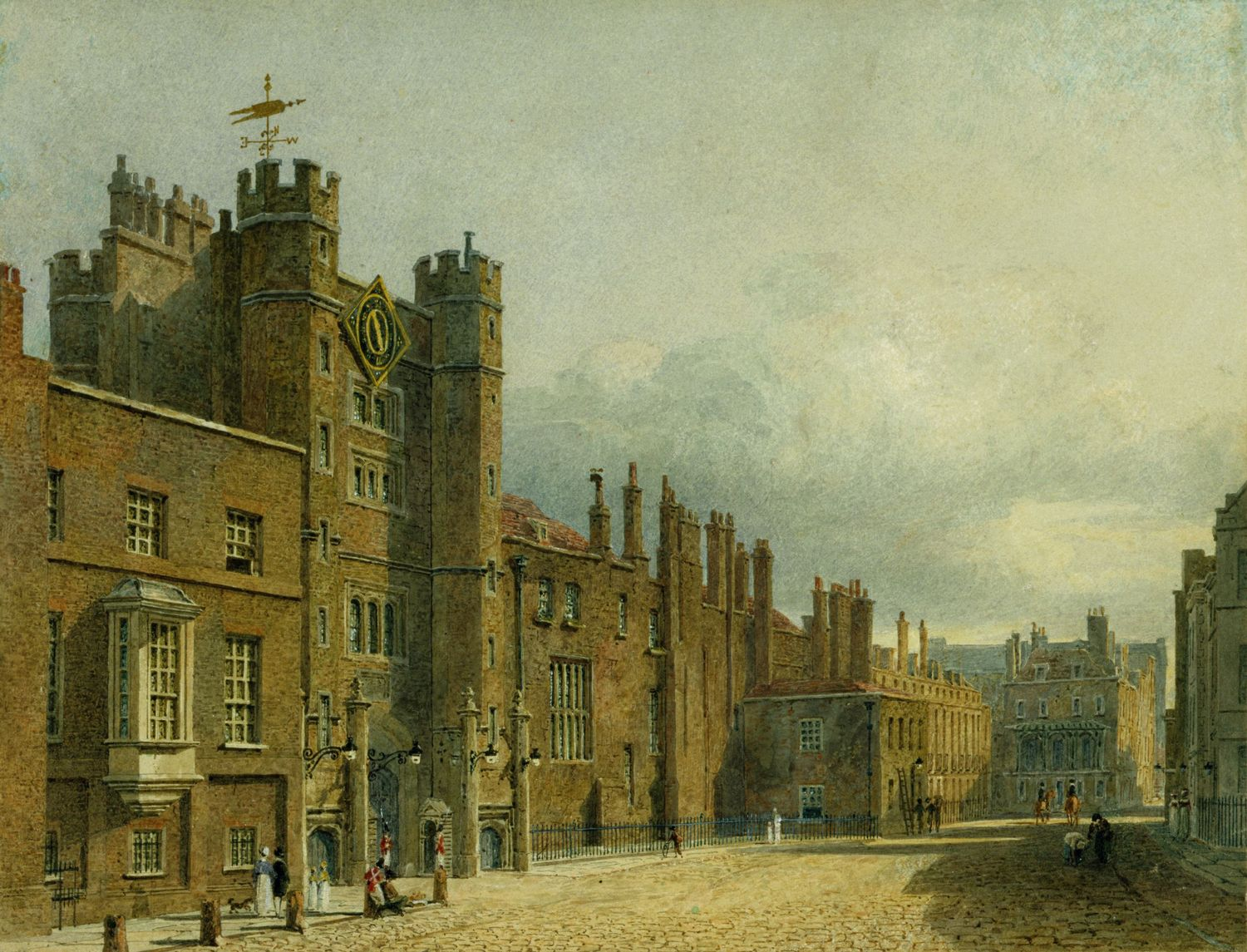
North Front

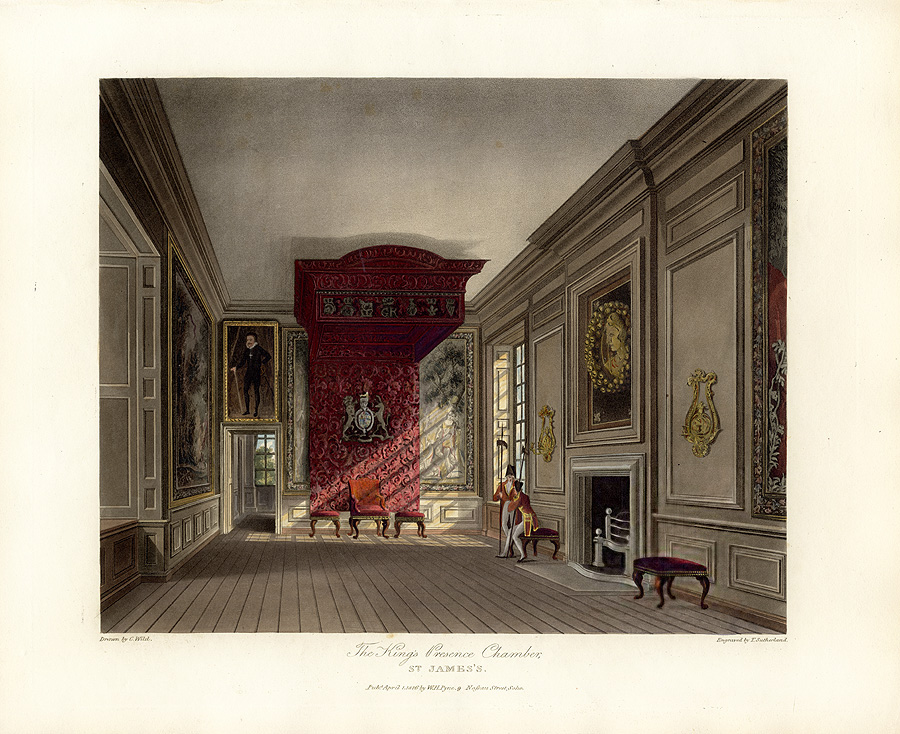
King's Presence Chamber

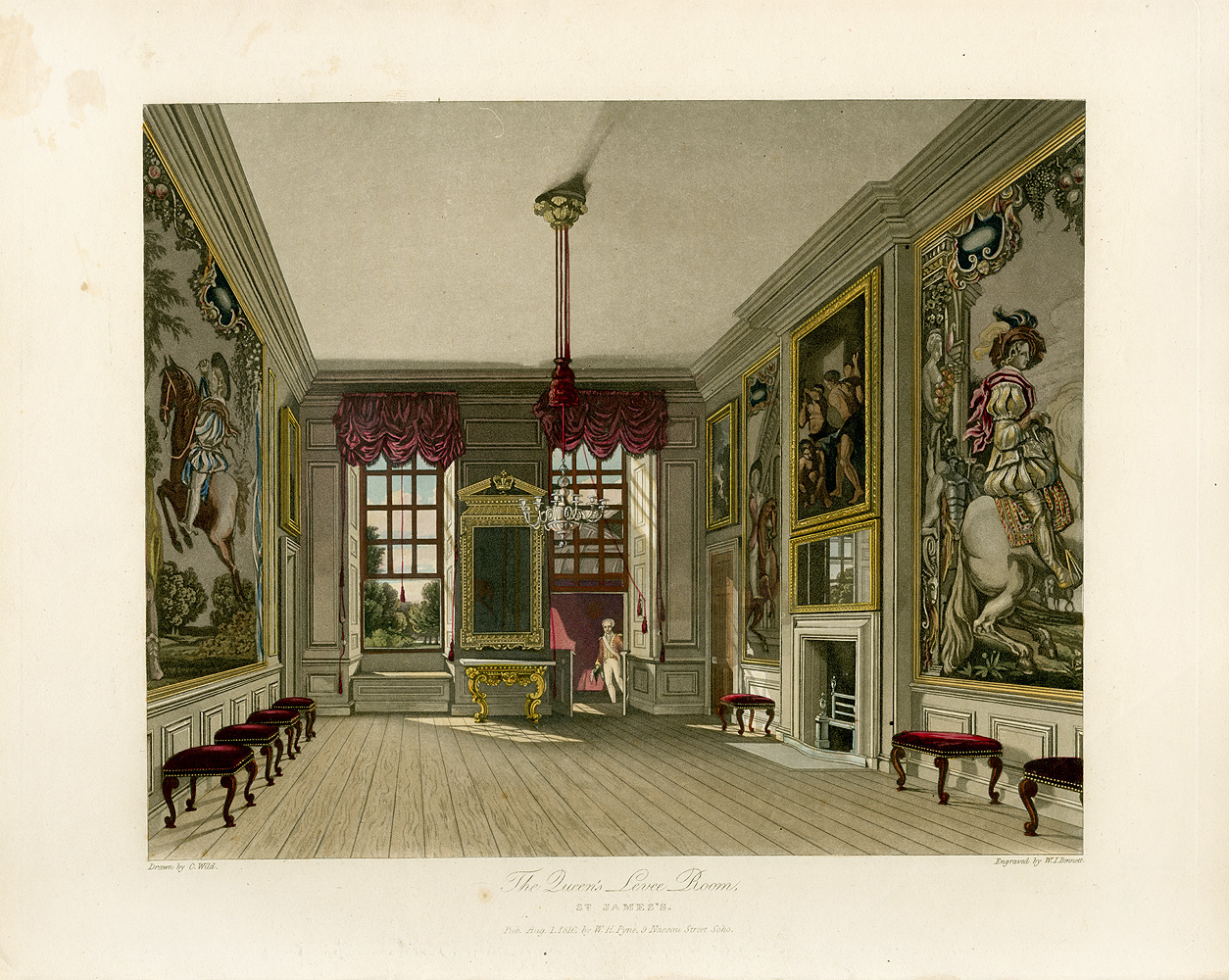
Queen's Levée Room

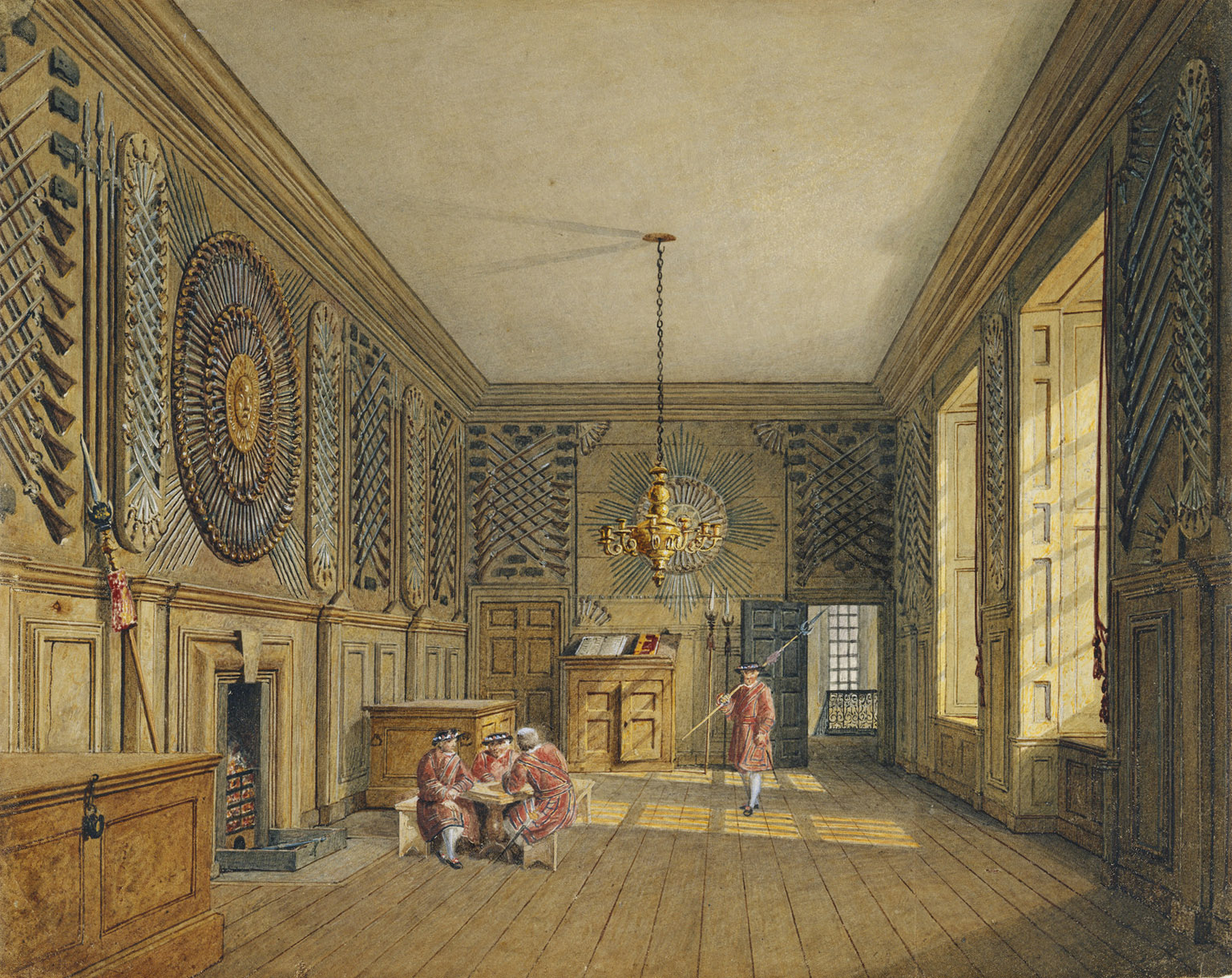
Guard Chamber
From a series of paintings by Charles Wild, as published in William Henry Pyne (1819), The History of the Royal Residences.

=== 20th century ===
In 1912–1913 the palace was the venue for the international conference that arranged the treaty between the Balkan states and the Ottoman Empire following the two Balkan Wars. Edward VIII when Prince of Wales used the palace as his 'town' residence until he moved into Marlborough House, and George VI as Duke of York resided there prior to his marriage in 1923. The Second Round Table Conference (September–December 1931), pertaining to Indian independence, was held at the palace. On 12 June 1941, Representatives of the United Kingdom, Canada, Australia, New Zealand, the Union of South Africa, and of the exiled governments of Belgium, Czechoslovakia, Greece, Luxembourg, Netherlands, Norway, Poland, and Yugoslavia, as well as General Charles de Gaulle of France, met and signed the Declaration of St James's Palace, which was the first of six treaties signed that established the United Nations and composed the Charter of the United Nations.

=== Proclamation Gallery ===
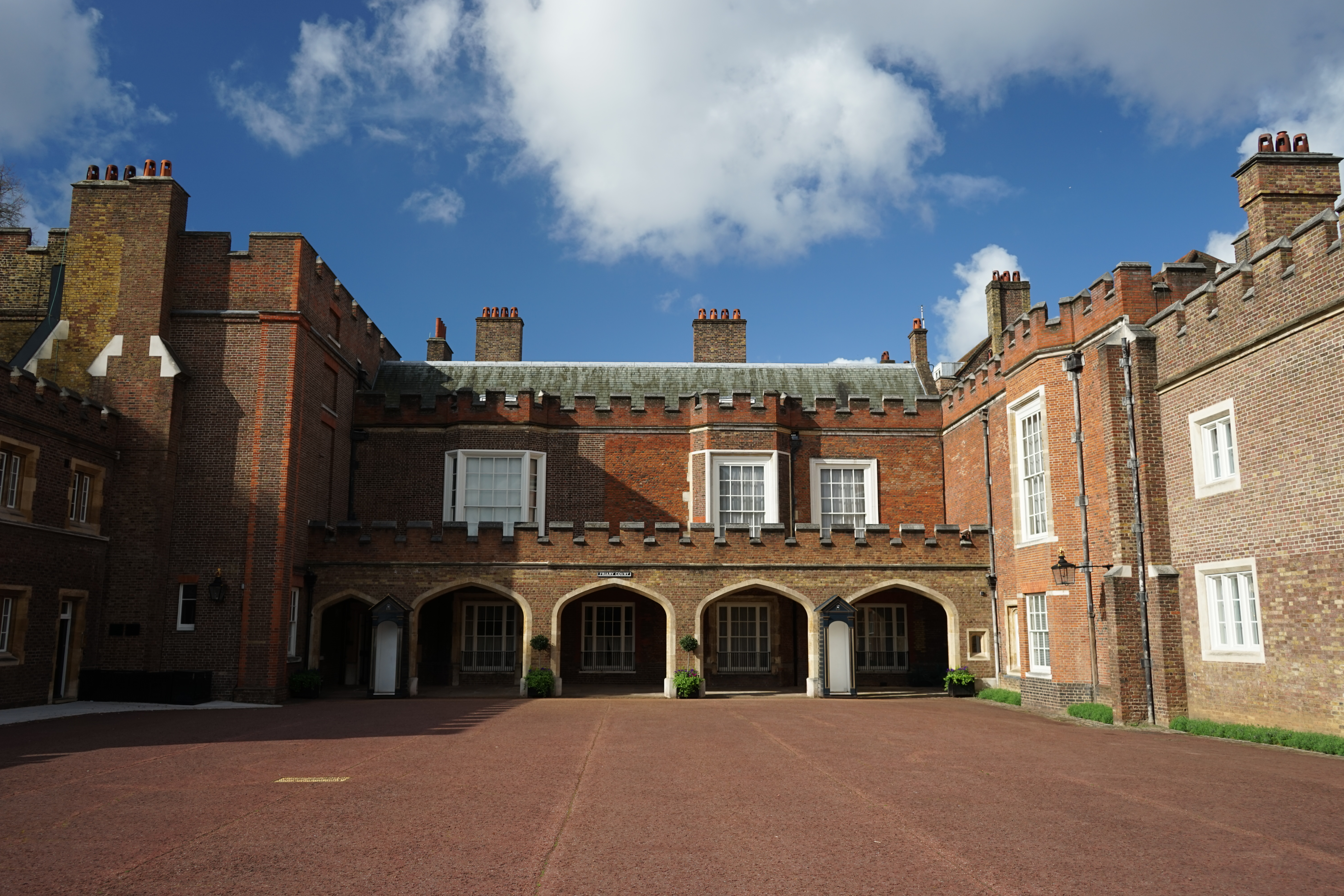
The Proclamation Gallery overlooking Friary Court at St James's Palace, London, where the proclamation of a new monarch is traditionally first read

The Proclamation Gallery is a part of St James's Palace, and it is used after the death of a reigning monarch. The Accession Council meets to declare the new monarch. Once the monarch has made a sacred oath to the council, the Garter King of Arms steps onto the Proclamation Gallery, which overlooks Friary Court, to proclaim the new monarch. Such an event last occurred on 10 September 2022 at the proclamation of King Charles III. To allow the Garter King of Arms and the trumpeters access to the balcony, workers removed the centre window the prior day and installed a temporary door.

== Today ==
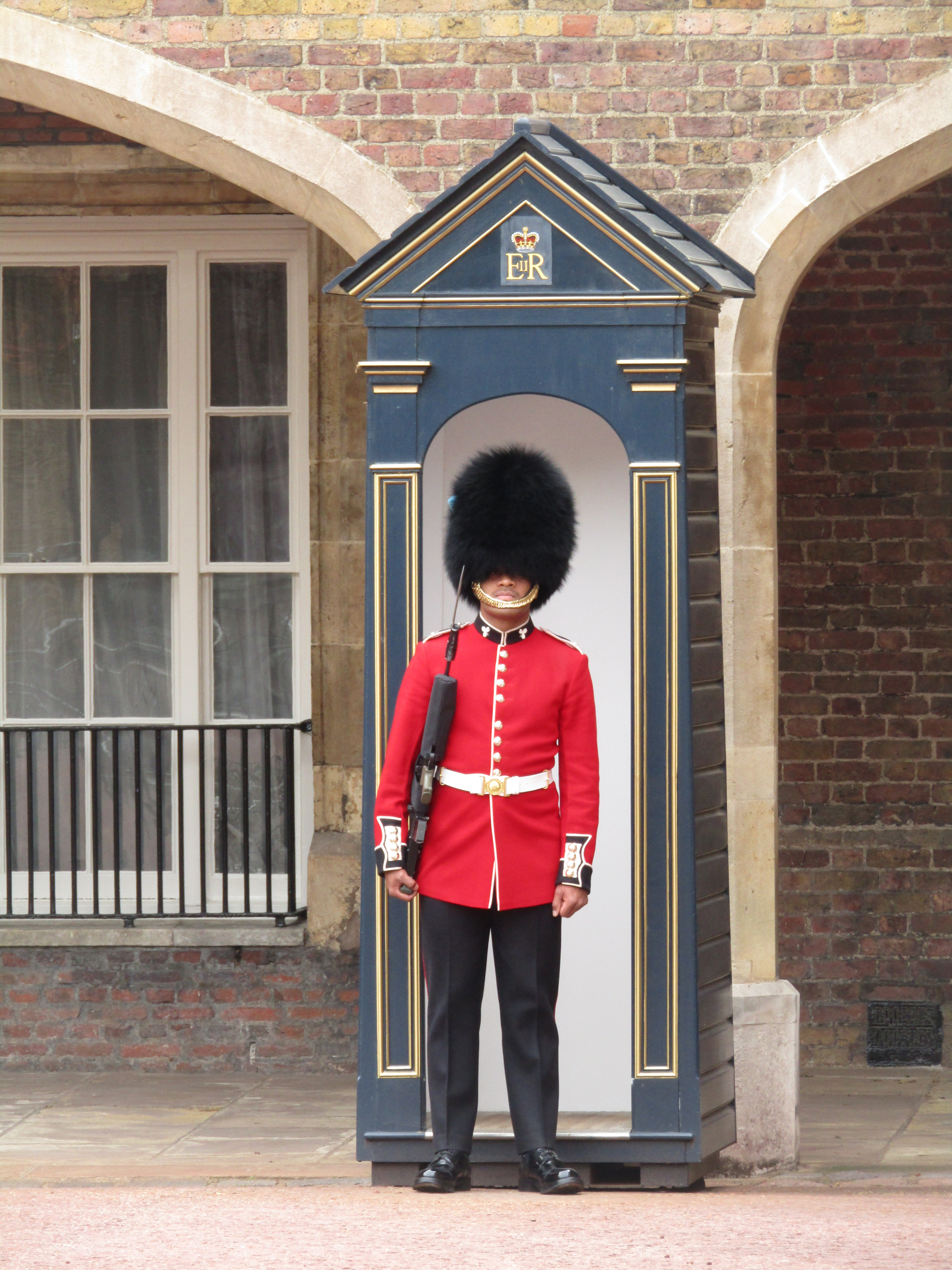
A sentry on duty at St James's Palace

St James's Palace is still a working palace, and the Royal Court is still formally based there. It is also the London residence of Princess Anne, Princess Beatrice, and Princess Alexandra. The palace is used to host official receptions, such as those of visiting heads of state, and charities of which members of the royal family are patrons. It forms part of a sprawling complex of buildings housing Court offices and officials' apartments. The immediate palace complex includes York House, the former home of Charles III and his sons, Princes William and Harry. Lancaster House, located next door across Stable Yard Road, is used by HM Government for official receptions, and the attached Clarence House, the former home of the Queen Mother, is the residence of King Charles III and Queen Camilla. The palace also served as the official residence of Princess Eugenie until April 2018.

The nearby Queen's Chapel, built by Inigo Jones, although since the 19th century across Marlborough Road, is still considered part of the Palace. While the Queen's Chapel is open to the public at selected times, the Chapel Royal in the palace is not accessible to the public. They both remain active places of worship.

The offices of the Royal Collection Department, the Marshal of the Diplomatic Corps, the Central Chancery of the Orders of Knighthood, the Chapel Royal, the Gentlemen at Arms, the Yeomen of the Guard and the King's Watermen are all housed at St James's Palace. Since the beginning of the 2000s, the Royal Philatelic Collection has been housed at St James's Palace, after spending the entire 20th century at Buckingham Palace.

On 1 June 2007, the palace, Clarence House and other buildings within its curtilage (other than public pavement on Marlborough Road) were designated as a protected site for the purposes of Section 128 of the Serious Organised Crime and Police Act 2005, making it a specific criminal offence for a person to trespass into the site. Until 2014, sentries were posted outside the palace's entrance on Pall Mall, which is located on the public street. However, following the terrorist attack on the Canadian Parliament, and the murder of a British soldier, the Pall Mall sentries were moved to Friary Court inside the palace's walls as a result of the potential threat of terrorist attacks.

St James's Palace is a Grade I listed building. Part of the former palace stables, now known as Apartment 5, St James's Palace and used as a grace and favour residence, has a separate Grade I listing.

== Additional reading ==
- Wolf Burchard, 'St James's Palace: George II and Queen Caroline's Principal London Residence', The Court Historian (2011), pp. 177–203.
- Nikolaus Pevsner, The Buildings of England: London 6: Westminster (2003), pp 594–601
