= Constitution Amendment (Pledge of Loyalty) Act 2006 =

New South Wales legislation

Constitutional Amendment (Pledge of Loyalty) Act 2006

Parliament of New South Wales
- Long title: An Act to amend the Constitution Act 1902 to require Members of Parliament and Ministers to take a pledge of loyalty to Australia and to the people of New South Wales instead of swearing allegiance to the Queen, and to revise the oaths taken by Executive Councillors.
- Citation: Constitution Amendment (Pledge of Loyalty) Act 2006 (NSW)
- Territorial extent: New South Wales
- Passed by: Legislative Assembly
- Passed: 7 April 2005
- Enacted: 7 April 2005
- Passed by: Legislative Council
- Passed: 7 March 2006
- Enacted: 7 March 2006
- Assented to by: Governor Marie Bashir
- Assented to: 3 April 2006
- Commenced: 3 April 2006
- Repealed: 3 December 2006

Legislative history

First chamber: Legislative Assembly
- Bill title: Constitution Amendment (Pledge of Loyalty) Bill 2004
- Introduced by: Paul Lynch
- Introduced: 4 May 2004
- First reading: 6 May 2004
- Second reading: 7 April 2005
- Third reading: 7 April 2005

Second chamber: Legislative Council
- Member(s) in charge: Peter Primrose
- First reading: 7 April 2005
- Second reading: 7 March 2006
- Third reading: 7 March 2006
- Status: Repealed

The Constitution Amendment (Pledge of Loyalty) Act 2006 No 6, was an Act that amended the Constitution Act 1902 to require members of the New South Wales Parliament and Ministers to take a pledge of loyalty to Australia and to the people of New South Wales instead of swearing allegiance to Queen Elizabeth II, her heirs and successors, and to revise the oaths taken by Executive Councillors. The act was assented to by the Governor on 3 April 2006.

== Purpose ==
In 2006 the NSW parliament, the oldest of the Australian States, passed an act to remove requirements for members of their Legislative Council, Legislative Assembly and Executive Council to pledge allegiance to the Queen, her heirs, and successors. The oath was replaced with an oath of loyalty to Australia and to the people of New South Wales.

== Text of the legislation ==
=== Legislative Council or Legislative Assembly ===
- (1) A Member of the Legislative Council or the Legislative Assembly is not permitted to sit or vote in the House to which the Member has been elected until the Member has taken the pledge of loyalty before the Governor or other person authorised by the Governor for that purpose.
- (2) The pledge of loyalty is to be in the following form:
  - Under God, I pledge my loyalty to Australia and to the people of New South Wales.
- (3) A Member may omit the words "Under God" when taking the pledge of loyalty.
- (4) A Member is not required, despite any other Act or law, to swear allegiance to Her Majesty Queen Elizabeth II or her heirs and successors before sitting or voting in the Legislative Council or the Legislative Assembly.
- (5) This section applies only to Members elected after the commencement of the Constitution Amendment (Pledge of Loyalty) Act 2006.

=== Executive Council ===
- (1) Before assuming office, a person appointed as a member of the Executive Council is to take:
  - (a) the pledge of loyalty, and
  - (b) the Executive Councillor's oath of office, before the Governor or other person authorised by the Governor for that purpose.
- (2) The pledge of loyalty is to be in the following form:
  - Under God, I pledge my loyalty to Australia and to the people of New South Wales.
- (3) A member of the Executive Council may omit the words "Under God" when taking the pledge of loyalty.
- (4) The Executive Councillor's oath of office is to be in the following form:
  - I, being appointed as a member of the Executive Council of New South Wales, do swear that I will perform the functions and duties of an Executive Councillor faithfully and to the best of my ability and, when required to do so, freely give my counsel and advice to the Governor or officer administering the Government of New South Wales for the time being for the good management of the public affairs of New South Wales, and that I will not directly or indirectly reveal matters debated in the council and committed to my secrecy, but that I will in all things be a true and faithful councillor. So help me God.
- (5) A member of the Executive Council may, instead of taking the Executive Councillor's oath, make an affirmation to the same effect.
- (6) This section applies only to members of the Executive Council appointed after the commencement of the Constitution Amendment (Pledge of Loyalty) Act 2006.

== Restoration of Oaths of Allegiance Act 2012 ==
On 5 June 2012, the Constitution Amendment (Restoration of Oaths of Allegiance) Act 2012 No 33 was assented to and made a further amendment to the Constitution Act 1902, by restoring the option of taking the oath of allegiance to the Queen, her heirs and successors, in addition to the option of taking the pledge of loyalty. The change applies to members of Legislative Council, Legislative Assembly and Executive Council.

== See also ==
- Perth Agreement
- Succession to the Crown Act 2013
- Royal Succession Bills and Acts
- Succession to the Throne Act, 2013
