= Succession to the Crown Bill =

Succession to the Crown Bill may refer to the following pieces of legislation introduced in the United Kingdom:

- Royal Succession Bills and Acts, several historical and modern succession bills and acts, including current legislative procedures of bills in the Lords and Commons.
- Succession to the Crown Bill 2004, a private members bill introduced by Lord Dubs to establish absolute primogeniture, remove the bar on individuals in the line of succession marrying Roman Catholics, and repeal the Royal Marriages Act 1772
- Succession to the Crown Bill 2011, a private members bill introduced under the Ten Minute Rule by Keith Vaz to establish absolute primogeniture
- Succession to the Crown Bill 2012, a government bill introduced on 13 December 2012 to implement the Perth Agreement among Commonwealth Heads of Government to establish absolute primogeniture, remove the bar on individuals in the line of succession marrying Roman Catholics, and amend the Royal Marriages Act 1772
