= Act of Settlement 1701 =

Act of the Parliament of England disqualifying Catholics from succeeding to the crown

Act of Settlement (Note: The citation of this act by this short title was authorised by section 1 of, and the first schedule to, Short Titles Act 1896 (59 & 60 Vict. c. 14), section 1 and first schedule. Due to the repeal of that provision it is now authorised by section 19(2) of the Interpretation Act 1978 (c. 30). The short title of this act is unusual in that it does not contain the year in which it was passed.)
- Act of Parliament
- Parliament of England
- Long title: An Act for the further Limitation of the Crown and better securing the Rights and Liberties of the Subject.
- Citation: 12 & 13 Will. 3. c. 2
- Territorial extent: England and Ireland initially: Kingdom of England (1701–1707); Kingdom of Ireland (1701–1800; extended by the Parliament of England to the Kingdom of Ireland); Kingdom of Great Britain (1707–1800); United Kingdom of Great Britain and Ireland (1801–1922); United Kingdom of Great Britain and Northern Ireland (1922–present); Canada (1867–1931; became a separate law of Canada as a consequence of Order in Council P.C. 3144 and the Succession to the Throne Act 1937); Commonwealth of Australia (1901–42; became a separate law of Australia as a consequence of the Statute of Westminster Adoption Act); New Zealand (1907–47; became a separate law of New Zealand as a consequence of the Statute of Westminster Adoption Act); (Dominion of Newfoundland) Newfoundland (1907–49; Dominion became a province of Canada); Union of South Africa (1910–31; became a separate law of the Union of South Africa as a consequence of the Statute of Westminster); Irish Free State (1922–31; became a separate law of the Irish Free State as a consequence of the Statute of Westminster)

Dates
- Royal assent: 12 June 1701
- Commencement: 6 February 1701 (Note: Start of session.)
Other legislation
Amended by	Various: Royal Succession Act 2013 (New Zealand); Succession to the Crown Act 2013 (United Kingdom); Succession to the Crown Act 2015 (Australia); Succession to the Throne Act 2015 (Barbados); Succession to the Throne Act, 2013 (Canada); British Nationality Act 1981; Statute Law Revision Act 1950; British Nationality Act 1948; Regency Act 1937; HM Declaration of Abdication Act 1936; British Nationality and Status of Aliens Act 1914; Accession Declaration Act 1910; Statute Law Revision and Civil Procedure Act 1881; Short Titles Act 1896; Aliens Act 1844; South Africa Act 1962; Army and Air Force Act 1961; Electoral Administration Act 2006; Constitutional Reform and Governance Act 2010; Army Act 1955; Air Force Act 1955; Aliens' Employment Act 1955; Armed Forces Act 1966; Solicitors Act 1974; Northern Ireland (Elections) Act 1998; Government of Wales Act 1998; Scotland Act 1998; Northern Ireland Act 1998; Courts Act 2003; Armed Forces Act 2006; The European Communities (Employment in the Civil Service) Order 1991; Regency Act 1705, s. 27; Act 1 Geo. 1. St. 2. Sovereign's Power to go Abroad (Restriction Repeated) Act 1715 c. 51 (1715); and others
Relates to	Bill of Rights 1689; Union of England and Scotland Act 1704; Princess Sophia's Precedence Act 1711; Lords Justices Act 1837; Regency Act 1840; Regency Act 1910; Regency Act 1937

Status: Amended

Text of statute as originally enacted

Text of the Act of Settlement (1700) as in force today (including any amendments) within the United Kingdom, from legislation.gov.uk.

The Act of Settlement (12 & 13 Will. 3. c. 2) is an act of the Parliament of England passed in 1701 (Note: The act received royal assent in 1701. However, it is formally dated as 1700 in official use, such as the listing for the act in the Chronological Table of the Statutes, because acts passed before the Acts of Parliament (Commencement) Act 1793 came into force are dated by the year in which the relevant parliamentary session began, which, in this case, was 6 February 1700 (OS) (6 February 1701 NS).) that settled the succession to the English and Irish crowns to Sophia of Hanover in the event that Queen Anne died without issue; it further reaffirmed the exclusion of Catholics and anyone married to a Catholic from the succession, along with the requirement for the monarch to be in communion with the Church of England contained in the Bill of Rights 1689. This had the effect of deposing the remaining descendants of Charles I other than Anne, as Sophia was the next Protestant in the line of succession. Born into the House of Wittelsbach, Sophia was a granddaughter of James VI and I from his most junior surviving line, (Note: Her only younger sibling Gustavus Adolphus of the Palatinate had died as a 9-year-old boy in 1641) with the crowns descending only to her non-Catholic heirs. Sophia predeceased Anne by two months, and her son succeeded to the throne as King George I, starting the Hanoverian dynasty in Great Britain and Ireland.

The Act of Supremacy 1558 (1 Eliz. 1. c. 1) had confirmed the independence of the Church of England from Roman Catholicism under the English monarch. One of the principal factors which contributed to the Glorious Revolution was the perceived assaults made on the Church of England by King James II, a Roman Catholic, who was deposed in favour of his Protestant daughter Mary II and her husband William III. The need for this Act of Settlement was prompted by the death of Prince William, Duke of Gloucester, the son and heir of the future Queen Anne, and by the perceived threat posed by the pretensions to the throne by remaining Roman Catholic members of the House of Stuart.

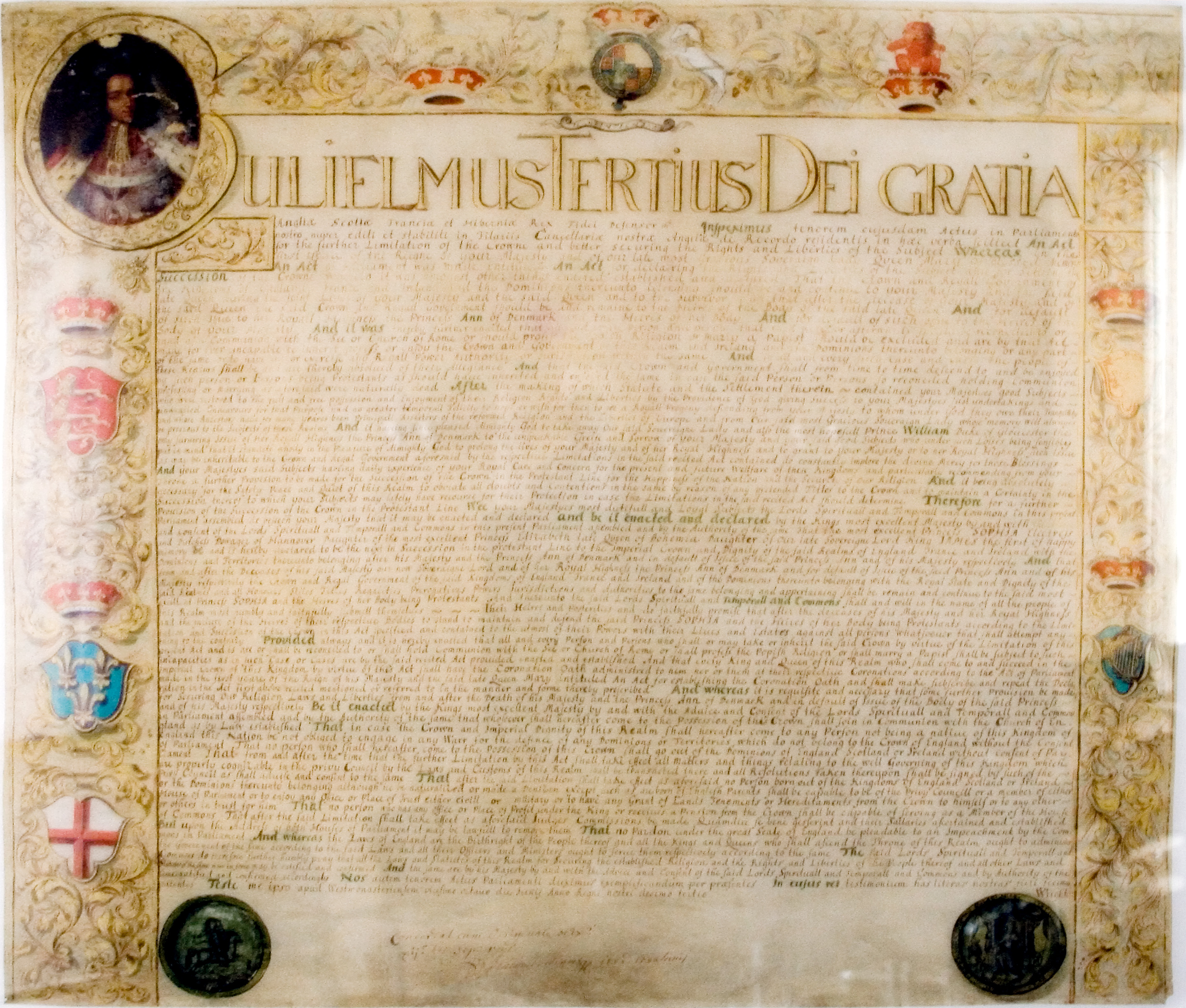
Facsimile of the Act of Settlement sent to Electress Sophia of Hanover

The act played a key role in the formation of the Kingdom of Great Britain as, though England and Scotland had shared a monarch since 1603, they had remained separately governed countries, with the Act catalysing the Union of England and Scotland. However, the Parliament of Scotland was more reluctant to abandon the House of Stuart, members of which had been Scottish monarchs long before they became English. Moreover, the Act also placed limits on both the role of foreigners in the British government and the power of the monarch with respect to the Parliament of England, though some of those provisions have been altered by subsequent legislation. After the American Revolution, portions of the Act of Settlement establishing judicial tenure "for good behavior" as opposed to at the monarch's pleasure later found themselves interwoven into the constitutions of many U.S. states, as well as Article III of the federal constitution in 1787.

Along with the Bill of Rights 1689, the Act of Settlement is constitutionally important and remains today one of the main constitutional laws governing the succession not only to the throne of the United Kingdom, but to those of the other Commonwealth realms, whether by assumption or by patriation. The Act of Settlement cannot be altered in any realm except by that realm's own parliament and, by convention, only with the consent of all the other realms, as it touches on the succession to the shared crown. On 26 March 2015, following the Perth Agreement, legislation amending the Act came into effect across the Commonwealth realms that removed the disqualification arising from marriage to a Roman Catholic and instituted absolute primogeniture.

== Background ==
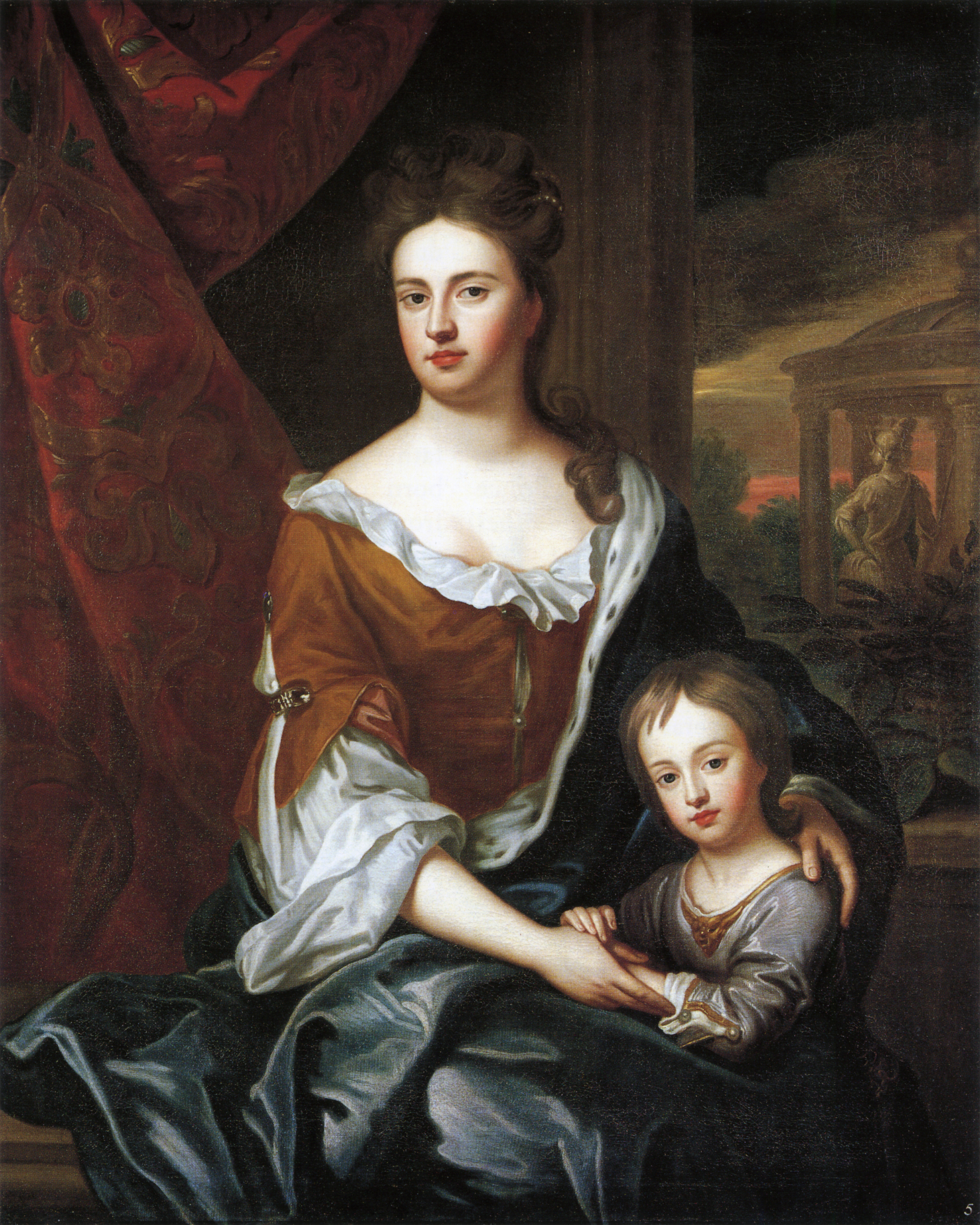
Princess Anne with Prince William, Duke of Gloucester, whose death in 1700 was the predicate for the Act

Following the Glorious Revolution, the line of succession to the English throne was governed by the Bill of Rights 1689, which declared that the flight of James II from England to France during the revolution amounted to an abdication of the throne and that James's daughter Mary II and her husband/cousin, William III (William of Orange, who was also James's nephew), were James's successors. The Bill of Rights also provided that the line of succession would go first through Mary's descendants, then through Mary's sister Anne and her descendants, and finally to the descendants of William III by a possible later marriage should he outlive Mary. During the debate, the House of Lords had attempted to append Sophia and her descendants to the line of succession, but the amendment failed in the Commons.

Mary II died childless in 1694, after which William III did not remarry. In 1700, Prince William, Duke of Gloucester, who was Anne's only child to survive infancy, died of what might have been smallpox at the age of 11. Thus, Anne was left as the only person in line to the throne. The Bill of Rights excluded Catholics from the throne, which ruled out James II and his children (as well as their descendants) sired after he converted to Catholicism in 1668. However, it did not provide for the further succession after Anne. Parliament thus saw the need to settle the succession on Sophia and her descendants, and thereby guarantee the continuity of the Crown in the Protestant line.

With religion and lineage initially decided, the ascendancy of William of Orange in 1689 would also bring his partiality to his Dutch favourites that followed. By 1701, anti-Dutch sentiment was widespread in England and action was considered necessary.

== The act ==
The Act of Settlement provided that the throne would pass to the Electress Sophia of Hanover – a granddaughter of James VI and I and a niece of King Charles I – and her descendants, but it excluded "for ever" "all and every Person and Persons who ... is are or shall be reconciled to or shall hold Communion with the See or Church of Rome or shall profess the Popish Religion or shall marry a Papist". Thus, those who were Roman Catholics, and those who married Roman Catholics, were barred from ascending the throne.

=== Conditional provisions ===
The act contained eight additional provisions that were to only come into effect upon the death of both William and Anne:

Firstly, the monarch "shall join in communion with the Church of England". This was intended to ensure the exclusion of a Roman Catholic monarch. Along with James II's perceived despotism, his religion was the main cause of the Glorious Revolution, and of the previous linked religious and succession problems which had been resolved by the joint monarchy of William III and Mary II.

Second, if a person not native to England comes to the throne, England will not wage war for "any dominions or territories which do not belong to the Crown of England, without the consent of Parliament". This would become relevant when a member of the House of Hanover ascended the British throne, as he would retain the territories of the Electorate of Hanover in what is now Lower Saxony (Germany), then part of the Holy Roman Empire. This provision has been dormant since Queen Victoria ascended the throne, because she did not inherit Hanover under the Salic Laws of the German-speaking states.

Third, no monarch may leave "the dominions of England, Scotland, or Ireland", without the consent of Parliament. This provision was repealed in 1716, at the request of George I who was also the Elector of Hanover and Duke of Brunswick-Lüneburg within the Holy Roman Empire; because of this, and also for personal reasons, he wished to visit Hanover from time to time.

Fourth, all government matters within the jurisdiction of the Privy Council were to be transacted there, and all council resolutions were to be signed by those who advised and consented to them. This was because Parliament wanted to know who was deciding policies, as sometimes councillors' signatures normally attached to resolutions were absent. This provision was repealed early in Queen Anne's reign, as many councillors ceased to offer advice and some stopped attending meetings altogether.

Fifth, no foreigner ("no Person born out of the Kingdoms of England Scotland or Ireland or the Dominions thereunto belonging"), even if naturalised or made a denizen (unless born of English parents), can be a Privy Councillor or a member of either House of Parliament, or hold "any Office or Place of Trust, either Civill [sic] or Military, or to [sic] have any Grant of Lands, Tenements or Hereditaments from the Crown, to himself or to any other or others in Trust for him". Subsequent nationality laws (today primarily the British Nationality Act 1981) made naturalised citizens the equal of those native born, and excluded Commonwealth citizens from the definition of foreigners, and citizens of the Irish Republic from the definition of aliens, but otherwise this provision still applies. It has however been disapplied in particular cases by a number of other statutes.

Sixth, no person who has an office under the monarch, or receives a pension from the Crown, was to be a Member of Parliament. This provision was inserted to avoid unwelcome royal influence over the House of Commons. It remains in force, but with several exceptions; ministers of the Crown were exempted early on before Anne's death in order to continue some degree of royal patronage, but had to stand for a by-election to re-enter the House upon such appointment until 1926. As a side effect, this provision means that members of the Commons seeking to resign from parliament can get around the prohibition on resignation by obtaining a sinecure in the control of the Crown; while several offices have historically been used for this purpose, two are currently in use: appointments generally alternate between the stewardships of the Chiltern Hundreds and of the Manor of Northstead.

Seventh, judges' commissions are valid quamdiu se bene gesserint (during good behaviour) and if they do not behave themselves, they can be removed only by both Houses of Parliament (or in other Commonwealth realms the one House of Parliament, depending on the legislature's structure). This provision was the result of various monarchs influencing judges' decisions, and its purpose was to assure judicial independence. This patent was used prior to 1701 but did not prevent Charles I from removing Sir John Walter as Chief Baron of the Exchequer.

Eighth, that "no Pardon under the Great Seal of England be pleadable to an Impeachment by the Commons in Parliament". This meant in effect that no pardon by the monarch was to save someone from being impeached by the House of Commons.

=== Family tree ===
The British monarchs of the House of Stuart, their relations, and the transition to the Hanovers

James V 1512–1542 r. 1513–1542	Christian III of Denmark; 1503–1559
Mary, Queen of Scots; 1542–1587 r. 1542–1567	Frederick II of Denmark; 1534–1588	Dorothea of Denmark; 1546–1617
James VI and I 1566–1625 r. 1567/1603–1625	Anne of Denmark; 1574–1619	George, Duke of Brunswick-Calenberg; 1582–1641
Henrietta Maria of France; 1609–1669	Charles I 1600–1649 r. 1625–1649	Elizabeth Stuart, Queen of Bohemia; 1596–1662
HANOVER
Charles II; 1630–1685 r. 1660–1685	Mary, Princess Royal and Princess of Orange; 1631–1660	Anne Hyde; 1637–1671	James II and VII; 1633–1701 r. 1685–1688	Mary of Modena; 1658–1718	Sophia of Hanover; 1630–1714	Ernest Augustus, Elector of Hanover; 1629–1698
James Scott, Duke of Monmouth (illegitimate); 1649–1685	William III; 1650–1702 r. 1689–1702	Mary II; 1662–1694 r. 1689–1694	Anne; 1665–1714 r. 1702–1714	James Francis Edward Stuart "the Old Pretender"; 1688–1766	Louisa Maria Stuart; 1692–1712	George I 1660–1727 r. 1714–1727
(no children)	Prince William, Duke of Gloucester; 1689–1700	Charles Edward Stuart "the Young Pretender"; 1720–1788	Henry Benedict Stuart "Cardinal Duke of York"; 1725–1807	George II; 1683–1760 r. 1727–1760

== Opposition ==
The Tory administration that replaced the Whig Junto in 1699 took responsibility for steering the Act through Parliament. As a result, it passed with little opposition, although five peers voted against it in the House of Lords, including the Earl of Huntingdon, his brother-in-law the Earl of Scarsdale and three others. While many shared their opposition to a "foreign" king, the general feeling was summed up as "better a German prince than a French one".

== Legacy ==
For different reasons, various constitutionalists have praised the Act of Settlement: Henry Hallam called the Act "the seal of our constitutional laws" and David Lindsay Keir placed its importance above the Bill of Rights of 1689. Naamani Tarkow wrote: "If one is to make sweeping statements, one may say that, save Magna Carta (more truly, its implications), the Act of Settlement is probably the most significant statute in English history".

=== Union of Scotland with England and Wales ===
The Act of Settlement was, in many ways, the major cause of the union of Scotland with England and Wales to form the Kingdom of Great Britain. The Parliament of Scotland had not been consulted about the Act of Settlement, and, in response, passed the Act of Security 1704, through which Scotland reserved the right to choose its own successor to Queen Anne. Stemming from this, the Parliament of England decided that, to ensure the stability and future prosperity of Great Britain, full union of the two parliaments and nations was essential before Anne's death.

It used a combination of exclusionary legislation (the Alien Act 1705), politics, and bribery to achieve this within three years under the Act of Union 1707. This success was in marked contrast to the four attempts at political union between 1606 and 1689, which all failed owing to a lack of political will in both kingdoms. By virtue of Article II of the Treaty of Union, which defined the succession to the throne of Great Britain, the Act of Settlement became part of Scots law as well.

=== Succession to the Crown ===
In addition to excluding James II, who died a few months after the act received royal assent, and his Roman Catholic children, Prince James (The Old Pretender) and the Princess Royal, the Act also excluded the descendants of Princess Henrietta, the youngest sister of James II. Henrietta's only child with surviving issue was Anne, Queen of Sardinia, a Roman Catholic, from whom descend all Jacobite pretenders after 1807.

With the legitimate descendants of Charles I either childless (in the case of his two grand-daughters the late Queen Mary II and her successor Queen Anne) or Roman Catholic, Parliament's choice was limited to Sophia of Hanover, the Protestant daughter of the late Elizabeth of Bohemia, the only other child of King James I to have survived childhood. Elizabeth had borne nine children who reached adulthood, of whom Sophia was the youngest daughter. However in 1701 Sophia was the senior Protestant one, therefore with a legitimate claim to the English throne; Parliament passed over her Roman Catholic siblings, namely her sister Louise Hollandine of the Palatinate, and their descendants, who included Elizabeth Charlotte, Duchess of Orléans; Louis Otto, Prince of Salm, and his aunts; Anne Henriette, Princess of Condé, and Benedicta Henrietta, Duchess of Brunswick-Lüneburg.

=== Removal from the succession due to Catholicism ===
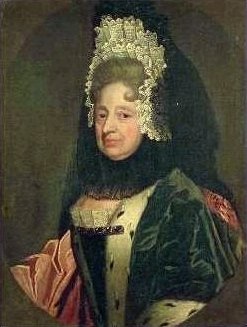
Sophia, Electress of Hanover

Since the act's passing the most senior living member of the royal family to have married a Roman Catholic, and thereby to have been removed from the line of succession, is Prince Michael of Kent, who married Baroness Marie-Christine von Reibnitz in 1978; he was fifteenth in the line of succession at the time. He was restored to the line of succession in 2015 when the Succession to the Crown Act 2013 came into force, and became 34th in line.

The next most senior living descendant of the Electress Sophia who had been ineligible to succeed on this ground is George Windsor, Earl of St Andrews, the elder son of Prince Edward, Duke of Kent, who married the Roman Catholic Sylvana Palma Tomaselli in 1988. His son, Lord Downpatrick, converted to Roman Catholicism in 2003 and is the most senior descendant of Sophia to be barred as a result of his religion. In 2008 his daughter, Lady Marina Windsor, also converted to Catholicism and was removed from the line of succession. More recently, Peter Phillips, the son of Anne, Princess Royal, and eleventh in line to the throne, married Autumn Kelly; Kelly had been brought up as a Roman Catholic, but she converted to Anglicanism prior to the wedding. Had she not done so, Phillips would have forfeited his place in the succession upon their marriage, only to have it restored in 2015.

Excluding those princesses who have married into Roman Catholic royal families, such as Marie of Edinburgh, Victoria Eugenie of Battenberg and Princess Beatrice of Edinburgh, one member of the Royal Family (that is, with the style of Royal Highness) has converted to Roman Catholicism since the passage of the Act: the Duchess of Kent, wife of Prince Edward, Duke of Kent, who converted on 14 January 1994, but her husband did not lose his place in the succession because she was an Anglican at the time of their marriage.

=== Present status ===
As well as being part of the law of the United Kingdom, the Act of Settlement was received into the laws of all the countries and territories over which the British monarch reigned. It remains part of the laws of the 15 Commonwealth realms and the relevant jurisdictions within those realms. In accordance with established convention, the Statute of Westminster 1931 and later laws, the Act of Settlement (along with the other laws governing the succession of the Commonwealth realms) may only be changed with the agreement of all the realms (and, in some federal realms, the constituent members of those federations). The Succession to the Crown Act 2013 changed many provisions of this Act.

== Amendment proposals ==
Challenges have been made against the Act of Settlement, especially its provisions regarding Roman Catholics and preference for males. However, changing the act is a complex process, since the act governs the shared succession of all the Commonwealth realms. The Statute of Westminster 1931 acknowledges by established convention that any changes to the rules of succession may be made only with the agreement of all of the states involved, with concurrent amendments to be made by each state's parliament or parliaments. Further, as the current monarch's eldest child and, in turn, his eldest child, are Anglican males, any change to the succession laws would have no immediate implications. Consequently, there was little public concern with the issues and debate had been confined largely to academic circles until the November 2010 announcement that Prince William was to marry. This raised the question of what would happen if he were to produce first a daughter and then a son.

The Times reported on 6 November 1995 that Prince Charles had said on that day to Tony Blair and Paddy Ashdown that "Catholics should be able to ascend to the British throne". Ashdown claimed the Prince said: "I really can't think why we can't have Catholics on the throne". In 1998, during debate on a Succession to the Crown Bill, Junior Home Office Minister Lord Williams of Mostyn informed the House of Lords that the Queen had "no objection to the Government's view that in determining the line of succession to the throne, daughters and sons should be treated in the same way."

=== Australia ===
In October 2011 the Australian federal government was reported to have reached an agreement with all of the states on potential changes to their laws in the wake of amendments to the Act of Settlement. The practice of the Australian states—for example, New South Wales and Victoria—has been, when legislating to repeal some imperial statutes so far as they still applied in Australia, to provide that imperial statutes concerning the royal succession remain in force.

The legal process required at the federal level remains, theoretically, unclear. The Australian constitution, as was noted during the crisis of 1936, contains no power for the federal parliament to legislate with respect to the monarchy. Everything thus turns upon the status and meaning of clause 2 in the Commonwealth of Australia Constitution Act 1900, which provides: "The provisions of this Act referring to the Queen shall extend to Her Majesty's heirs and successors in the sovereignty of the United Kingdom."

Anne Twomey reviews three possible interpretations of the clause.

- First: it "mandates that whoever is the sovereign of the United Kingdom is also, by virtue of this external fact, sovereign of Australia"; accordingly, changes to British succession laws would have no effect on Australian law, but if the British amendment changed the sovereign, then the new sovereign of the United Kingdom would automatically become the new sovereign of Australia.
- Second, it is "merely an interpretative provision", operating to ensure that references to "the Queen" in the Constitution are references to whoever may at the time be the incumbent of the "sovereignty of the United Kingdom" as determined with regard to Australia, following the Australia Act 1986, by Australian law.
- Or, third, it incorporates the United Kingdom rules of succession into the Commonwealth of Australia Constitution Act, which itself can now be altered only by Australia, according to the Australia Act 1986; in that way, the British rules of succession have been patriated to Australia and, with regard to Australia, are subject to amendment or repeal solely by Australian law.

However, Twomey expresses confidence that, if the High Court of Australia were to be faced with the problems of covering clause 2, it would find some way to conclude that, with regard to Australia, the clause is subject solely to Australian law. Canadian scholar Richard Toporoski theorised in 1998 that "if, let us say, an alteration were to be made in the United Kingdom to the Act of Settlement 1701, providing for the succession of the Crown... [i]t is my opinion that the domestic constitutional law of Australia or Papua New Guinea, for example, would provide for the succession in those countries of the same person who became Sovereign of the United Kingdom."

In practice, when legislating for the Perth Agreement (see below), the Australian governments took the approach of the states requesting, and referring power to, the federal government to enact the legislation on behalf of the states (under paragraph 51(xxxviii) of the Australian Constitution) and the Commonwealth of Australia.

=== Canada ===
In Canada, where the Act of Settlement (French: Acte d'établissement) is now a part of Canadian constitutional law, Tony O'Donohue, a Canadian civic politician, took issue with the provisions that exclude Roman Catholics from the throne, and which make the monarch of Canada the Supreme Governor of the Church of England, requiring him or her to be an Anglican. This, he claimed, discriminated against non-Anglicans, including Catholics, who are the largest faith group in Canada. In 2002, O'Donohue launched a court action that argued the Act of Settlement violated the Canadian Charter of Rights and Freedoms, but, the case was dismissed by the court. It found that, as the Act of Settlement is part of the Canadian constitution, the Charter of Rights and Freedoms, as another part of the same constitution, does not have supremacy over it. Also, the court noted that, while Canada has the power to amend the line of succession to the Canadian throne, the Statute of Westminster stipulates that the agreement of the governments of the fifteen other Commonwealth realms that share the Crown would first have to be sought if Canada wished to continue its relationship with these countries. An appeal of the decision was dismissed on 16 March 2005. Some commentators state that, as a result of this, any single provincial legislature could hinder any attempts to change this Act, and by extension, to the line of succession for the shared crown of all 16 Commonwealth realms. Others contend that that is not the case, and changes to the succession instituted by an Act of the Parliament of Canada "[in accord] with the convention of symmetry that preserves the personal unity of the British and Dominion Crowns".

With the announcement in 2007 of the engagement of Peter Phillips to Autumn Kelly, a Roman Catholic and a Canadian, discussion about the Act of Settlement was revived. Norman Spector called in The Globe and Mail for Prime Minister Stephen Harper to address the issue of the Act's bar on Catholics, saying Phillips' marriage to Kelly would be the first time the provisions of the Act would bear directly on Canada—Phillips would be barred from acceding to the Canadian throne because he married a Roman Catholic Canadian. (In fact, Lord St Andrews had already lost his place in the line of succession when he married the Roman Catholic Canadian Sylvana Palma Tomaselli in 1988. But St Andrews' place in the line of succession was significantly lower than Phillips'.) Criticism of the Act of Settlement due to the Phillips–Kelly marriage was muted when Autumn Kelly converted to Anglicanism shortly before her marriage, thus preserving her husband's place in the line of succession.

=== United Kingdom ===
From time to time there has been debate over repealing the clause that prevents Roman Catholics, or those who marry one, from ascending to the British throne. Proponents of repeal argue that the clause is a bigoted anachronism; Cardinal Winning, who was leader of the Roman Catholic Church in Scotland, called the act an "insult" to Catholics. Cardinal Murphy-O'Connor, the leader of the Roman Catholic Church in England, pointed out that Prince William (later the Duke of Cambridge) "can marry by law a Hindu, a Buddhist, anyone, but not a Roman Catholic." Opponents of repeal, such as Enoch Powell and Adrian Hilton, believe that it would lead to the disestablishment of the Church of England as the state religion if a Roman Catholic were to come to the throne. They also note that the monarch must swear to defend the faith and be a member of the Anglican Communion, but that a Roman Catholic monarch would, like all Roman Catholics, owe allegiance to the Pope. This would, according to opponents of repeal, amount to a loss of sovereignty for the Anglican Church.

When in December 1978 there was media speculation that Prince Charles might marry a Roman Catholic, Powell defended the provision that excludes Roman Catholics from ascending the throne, stating his objection was not rooted in religious bigotry but in political considerations. He said a Roman Catholic monarch would mean the acceptance of a source of authority external to the realm and "in the literal sense, foreign to the Crown-in-Parliament ... Between Roman Catholicism and royal supremacy there is, as Saint Thomas More concluded, no reconciliation." Powell concluded that a Roman Catholic crown would be the destruction of the Church of England because "it would contradict the essential character of that church."

He continued:

When Thomas Hobbes wrote that "the Papacy is no other than the ghost of the deceased Roman Empire sitting crowned upon the grave thereof", he was promulgating an enormously important truth. Authority in the Roman Church is the exertion of that imperium from which England in the 16th century finally and decisively declared its national independence as the alter imperium, the "other empire", of which Henry VIII declared "This realm of England is an empire" ... It would signal the beginning of the end of the British monarchy. It would portend the eventual surrender of everything that has made us, and keeps us still, a nation.

The Scottish Parliament unanimously passed a motion in 1999 calling for the complete removal of any discrimination linked to the monarchy and the repeal of the Act of Settlement. The following year, The Guardian challenged the succession law in court, claiming that it violated the European Convention on Human Rights, which provides,

The enjoyment of the rights and freedoms set forth in this Convention shall be secured without discrimination on any ground such as sex, race, colour, language, religion, political or other opinion, national or social origin, association with a national minority, property, birth, or other status.

As the Convention nowhere lists the right to succeed to the Crown as a human right, the challenge was rejected. The Guardian subsequently launched a campaign to repeal the Act, which by the end of May 2002 received signatures from 72 MPs, 35 peers, the Archbishop of York David Hope and several non-Anglican religious leaders.

Adrian Hilton, writing in The Spectator in 2003, defended the Act of Settlement as not "irrational prejudice or blind bigotry", but claimed that it was passed because "the nation had learnt that when a Roman Catholic monarch is upon the throne, religious and civil liberty is lost." He points to the Pope's claiming universal jurisdiction, and Hilton argues that "it would be intolerable to have, as the sovereign of a Protestant and free country, one who owes any allegiance to the head of any other state" and contends that, if such situation came about, "we will have undone centuries of common law." He said that because the Roman Catholic Church does not recognise the Church of England as an apostolic church, a Roman Catholic monarch who abided by their faith's doctrine would be obliged to view Anglican and Church of Scotland archbishops, bishops, and clergy as part of the laity and therefore "lacking the ordained authority to preach and celebrate the sacraments." (Hilton noted that the Church of Scotland's Presbyterian polity does not include bishops or archbishops.) Hilton said a Roman Catholic monarch would be unable to be crowned by the Archbishop of Canterbury and notes that other European states have similar religious provisions for their monarchs: Denmark, Norway, and Sweden, whose constitutions compel their monarchs to be Lutherans; the Netherlands, which has a constitution requiring its monarchs be members of the Protestant House of Orange; and Belgium, which has a constitution that provides for the succession to be through Roman Catholic houses.

In December 2004, a private member's bill—the Succession to the Crown Bill—was introduced in the House of Lords. The government, headed by Tony Blair, blocked all attempts to revise the succession laws, claiming it would raise too many constitutional issues and it was unnecessary at the time. In the British general election the following year, Michael Howard promised to work towards having the prohibition removed if the Conservative Party gained a majority of seats in the House of Commons, but the election was won by Blair's Labour Party. Four years later, plans drawn up by Chris Bryant were revealed that would end the exclusion of Catholics from the throne and end the doctrine of male-preference primogeniture in favour of absolute primogeniture, which governs succession solely on birth order and not on sex. The issue was raised again in January 2009, when a private member's bill to amend the Act of Succession was introduced in parliament.

=== Across the realms ===
In early 2011 Keith Vaz, a Labour Member of Parliament, introduced to the House of Commons at Westminster a private member's bill which proposed that the Act of Settlement be amended to remove the provisions relating to Roman Catholicism and change the primogeniture governing the line of succession to the British throne from male-preference to absolute cognatic. Vaz sought support for his project from the Canadian Cabinet and Prime Minister Stephen Harper, but the Office of the Prime Minister of Canada responded that the issue was "not a priority for the government or for Canadians without further elaboration on the merits or drawbacks of the proposed reforms". Stephenson King, Prime Minister of Saint Lucia, said he supported the idea and it was reported that the government of New Zealand did, as well. The Monarchist League of Canada said at the time to the media that it "supports amending the Act of Settlement in order to modernize the succession rules."

Later the same year, the Deputy Prime Minister of the United Kingdom, Nick Clegg, announced that the government was considering a change in the law. At approximately the same time, it was reported that British Prime Minister David Cameron had written to each of the prime ministers of the other fifteen Commonwealth realms, asking for their support in changing the succession to absolute primogeniture and notifying them he would raise his proposals at that year's Commonwealth Heads of Government Meeting (CHOGM) in Perth, Australia. Cameron reportedly also proposed removing the restriction on successors being or marrying Roman Catholics; however, potential Roman Catholic successors would be required to convert to Anglicanism prior to acceding to the throne. In reaction to the letter and media coverage, Harper stated that, this time, he was "supportive" of what he saw as "reasonable modernizations".

At the 2011 Commonwealth Heads of Government Meeting on 28 October 2011, the prime ministers of the other Commonwealth realms agreed to support Cameron's proposed changes to the Act. The bill put before the Parliament of the United Kingdom would act as a model for the legislation required to be passed in at least some of the other realms, and any changes would only first take effect if the Duke of Cambridge were to have a daughter before a son.

The British group Republic asserted that succession reform would not make the monarchy any less discriminatory. As it welcomed the gender equality reforms, the British newspaper The Guardian criticized the lack of a proposal to remove the ban on Catholics sitting on the throne, as did Alex Salmond, First Minister of Scotland, who pointed out that "It is deeply disappointing that the reform [of the Act of Settlement of 1701] has stopped short of removing the unjustifiable barrier on a Catholic becoming monarch." On the subject, Cameron asserted: "Let me be clear, the monarch must be in communion with the Church of England because he or she is the head of that Church."

The disqualification arising from marriage to a Roman Catholic was removed by the Succession to the Crown Act 2013.

== Subsequent developments ==
In section 3 from the words " That after the said limitation shall take effect as aforesaid, judges commissions " where those words secondly occur to the words " it may be lawful to remove them " were repealed for Northern Ireland by section 1(1) of, and the first schedule to, the Statute Law Revision Act 1950 (14 Geo. 6. c. 6), which came into force on 23 May 1950.

== See also ==
- Jacobitism
- List of British monarchs
- List of Canadian monarchs
- List of New Zealand monarchs
- List of Australian monarchs
- Royal Succession Bills and Acts
- Succession to the British throne
- Alternative successions of the English and British crown

== Bibliography ==
- Somerset, Anne (2012). Queen Anne; the Politics of Passion. Harper. ISBN 978-0007203765.
- Naamani Tarkow, I. (December 1943). "The Significance of the Act of Settlement in the Evolution of English Democracy". Political Science Quarterly. 58 (4): 537–561. doi:10.2307/2144947. JSTOR 2144947.
- Stevens, Robert (2002). The English Judges. Oxford and Portland, Oregon: Hart Publishing. pp. 1–13. ISBN 1-84113-495-3.
- Twomey, Anne (2011). "Changing the Rules of Succession to the Throne". Sydney Law School Legal Studies Research Paper. 11 (71). University of Sydney, Faculty of Law. SSRN 1943287.
