= Perth Agreement =

2011 reform to British and Commonwealth succession laws

The Perth Agreement was made in Australia in 2011 by the prime ministers of what were then the sixteen states known as Commonwealth realms, all recognising Elizabeth II as their head of state. The document agreed that the governments of the realms would amend their laws concerning the succession to their shared throne and related matters. The changes, in summary, comprised:

- Replacing male-preference primogeniture (under which males take precedence over females in the royal succession) with absolute primogeniture (which does not distinguish sex as a succession criterion), for those born after 28 October 2011;
- Ending disqualification of any person who had married a Catholic;
- Establishing that only the six people closest to the throne require the monarch's permission to marry.

The ban on non-Protestants becoming monarch and the requirement for them to be in communion with the Church of England was not altered.

The Agreement was signed in October 2011 in Perth, Australia, which hosted the biennial Commonwealth Heads of Government Meeting (CHOGM). The institutional and constitutional principles of Commonwealth realms are shared equally as enacted in the Statute of Westminster 1931, which made the process of implementing the agreement lengthy and complex.

By December 2012, all the realm governments had agreed to enact it. New Zealand chaired a working group to determine the process. The Commonwealth realms – at the time including the United Kingdom, Canada, Australia, New Zealand, Jamaica, Barbados, the Bahamas, Grenada, Papua New Guinea, the Solomon Islands, Tuvalu, Saint Lucia, Saint Vincent and the Grenadines, Belize, Antigua and Barbuda, and Saint Kitts and Nevis – are independent of each other, while sharing one person as monarch in a constitutionally equal fashion. (Barbados has since become a republic.) The working group later affirmed that, across all these realms, appropriate laws were passed and came into effect, and then Deputy Prime Minister of the United Kingdom, Nick Clegg, reiterated this on 26 March 2015. Canada's law was challenged in court but has been upheld.

On the day the changes came into effect in March 2015, the first of the persons affected by the headline provision were the children of Lady Davina Windsor, the elder daughter of Prince Richard, Duke of Gloucester and Birgitte, Duchess of Gloucester; the succession positions of Lady Davina's son Tāne (born 2012) and daughter Senna (born 2010) were reversed, Tāne becoming 29th and Senna becoming 28th in line.

== Background ==
Succession to the throne in each of the Commonwealth realms is governed both by common law and statute. Under common law, the Crown was transmitted by male-preference primogeniture, under which succession passed first to the monarch's or nearest dynast's legitimate sons (and to their legitimate issue) in order of birth, and subsequently to their daughters and their legitimate issue, again in order of birth, so that sons always inherit before their sisters, elder children inherit before younger, and descendants inherit before collateral relatives.

Succession is also governed by the Acts of Union 1707, which restates the provisions of the Act of Settlement 1701, and the Bill of Rights 1689. These laws originally restricted the succession to legitimate descendants of Sophia, Electress of Hanover (the mother of George I), and debar those who are Catholics or who have married Catholics. The descendants of those who are debarred for being or marrying Catholics, however, may still be eligible to succeed. By a convention made explicit in the preamble to the Statute of Westminster 1931, the line of succession cannot be altered in any realm without the assent of the parliaments of the other 15 realms.

Challenges had been made against the Act of Settlement, especially its provisions regarding Catholics and preference for males. In Canada, where the Act of Settlement is part of Canadian constitutional law, Tony O'Donohue, a former Toronto city councillor, took issue with the provisions that exclude Catholics from the throne In 2002, O'Donohue launched a court action that argued the Act of Settlement violates the Canadian Charter of Rights and Freedoms, but the case was dismissed by the court.

In the United Kingdom, from time to time there had been debate over repealing the clause that prevents "Papists" (Catholics) or those who marry one from ascending to the British throne. The Scottish Parliament unanimously passed a motion in 1999 calling for the complete removal of any discrimination linked to the monarchy and the repeal of the Act of Settlement. A private member's bill—the Succession to the Crown Bill—was introduced in the House of Lords in December 2004. The government, headed by Tony Blair, however, blocked all attempts to revise the succession laws, claiming it would raise too many constitutional issues and it was unnecessary at the time. The issue was raised again in January 2009, when a private member's bill to amend the Act of Succession was introduced in parliament. British Labour Member of Parliament Keith Vaz introduced to the House of Commons at Westminster, in early 2011, a private member's bill, which proposed that the Act of Settlement be amended to remove the provisions relating to Catholicism and change primogeniture governing the line of succession to the British throne from male-preference to absolute.

== Proposals in 2011 ==
=== Line of succession ===
In 2011, the deputy prime minister of the United Kingdom, Nick Clegg, announced that the British government was considering a change in the law. At about the same time, it was reported that Prime Minister David Cameron had written to the prime ministers of each of the other 15 Commonwealth realms, asking for their support in changing the succession to absolute primogeniture, and notifying them he would raise his proposals at that year's Commonwealth Heads of Government Meeting (CHOGM) in Perth, Western Australia. While discussions took place during the summit, it was an agenda side accord, as most Commonwealth member states do not have a monarchical form of government - the across-the-board function of Head of the Commonwealth is to convene together nations and celebrate plans, projects, agreements and initiatives between all its members.

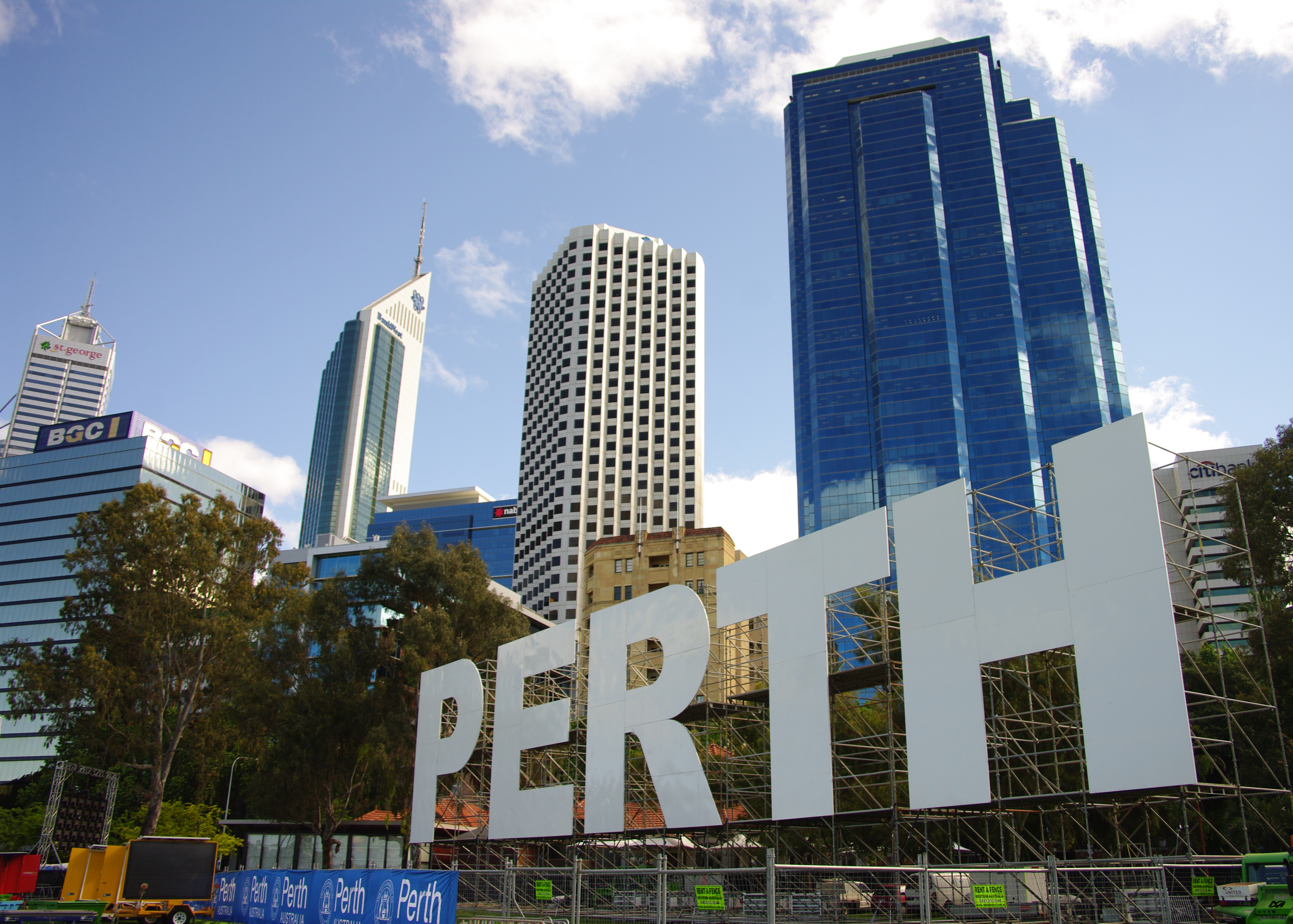
Signage for events related to the Commonwealth Heads of Government Meeting in Perth, Western Australia

At CHOGM on 28 October 2011, the prime ministers of the other Commonwealth realms agreed to support the proposed changes. The proposed changes were to replace male preference primogeniture with absolute primogeniture for all persons in the line of succession born after 28 October 2011, end the disqualification of those who married Catholics, and limit the requirement for those in line to the throne to acquire permission of the sovereign to marry. The prohibition on Catholics becoming monarch would remain. The bill put before the Parliament of the United Kingdom would act as a model for the legislation required to be passed in at least some of the other realms. Elizabeth II was understood to support the changes.

Cameron stated: "The idea that a younger son should become monarch instead of an elder daughter simply because he is a man, or that a future monarch can marry someone of any faith except a Catholic—this way of thinking is at odds with the modern countries that we have become." On the question of continued requirements that the sovereign be a Protestant, Cameron added, "Let me be clear, the monarch must be in communion with the Church of England because he or she is the head of that Church."

=== Royal marriage ===
Along with the changes in the succession law, Cameron proposed that the necessity for royal consent to marriages in the royal family should be limited to the first six people in line to the throne. During the reign of Queen Elizabeth II (under the Royal Marriages Act 1772), almost every descendant of King George II needed the Queen's permission to marry, which by 2011 was thousands of people. While the Royal Marriages Act 1772 was in force, marrying without permission made the marriage void. Under the proposed new law, any already formalised marriage that was deemed invalid under the 1772 Act would be retroactively legalised; descendants of such a marriage would however remain excluded from the line of succession to the throne, to ensure that the validity of the descent of the Crown from King George II down to the present day could not be affected by the changes. These changes were approved by the other Commonwealth leaders.

=== Commentary ===
Cameron's proposals were supported by the prime minister of Australia, Julia Gillard, who said she was "very enthusiastic about it. You would expect the first Australian woman prime minister to be very enthusiastic about a change which equals equality for women in a new area." Canadian prime minister Stephen Harper described himself "supportive" of the reforms as "obvious modernizations". The Monarchist League of Canada also expressed favour for the plan, as did Monarchy New Zealand. A poll carried out by Forum Research in February 2013 found that 73% of Canadians polled "agreed with the change, which would permit a first-born female to become queen even if she had brothers."

Scottish first minister Alex Salmond was more critical, saying: "It is deeply disappointing that the reform has stopped short of removing the unjustifiable barrier on a Catholic becoming monarch." While welcoming the gender equality reforms, The Guardian also criticised the failure to remove the ban on Catholics sitting on the throne as "fanning a religious hostility the rest of Europe was already growing beyond." A representative of the British campaigning group Republic said monarchical succession is inherently biased and "To suggest that this has anything to do with equality is utterly absurd," an opinion echoed by Citizens for a Canadian Republic.

Robert Hazell and Bob Morris pointed out that "the [other] realms were free to alter their constitutions without reference to the UK, but the UK could not do so on this occasion without seeking the realms' consent; the realms were relatively freer to alter their constitutions than was the UK itself" and that this inversion of the constitutional situation under imperialism was surprising to some. However, as a corollary, they pointed to Peter Boyce's earlier assertion in The Queen's Other Realms: The Crown and Its Legacy in Australia, Canada and New Zealand that the fact that the change in the succession was initiated by the United Kingdom government was a reminder to the other Commonwealth realms that "their crown is derivative, if not subordinate" to the crown of the United Kingdom.

== Legislative processes ==
The Cabinet Secretary of New Zealand chaired a working group to discuss the best way of accomplishing the reforms in all the Commonwealth realms. The realms agreed that the United Kingdom would be the first to draft legislation, but that it would not be introduced without the agreement of the other realms and would not be commenced until the appropriate domestic arrangements were in place in the other realms.

On 2 December 2012, the British government received final agreement in writing from the governments of the other 15 Commonwealth realms regarding all three elements of the reform. On 4 December 2012, the day after the Duchess of Cambridge's pregnancy was announced, Clegg announced this final agreement, adding that the other realm governments had confirmed that they would be "able to take the necessary measures in their own countries."

While some realms deferred to the British legislation, a number of the other realms passed their own laws effecting the changes in succession.

=== Australia ===
The English Bill of Rights 1689 and Act of Settlement 1701 are, and the Royal Marriages Act 1772 was, incorporated into Australian law, and the Act of Settlement is part of the laws of the Australian states and territories, and therefore not only Australia but also its states had to change their laws. At a meeting of the Council of Australian Governments (COAG) in mid-December 2012, the then prime minister, Julia Gillard, and the premiers of five states agreed each state legislature would pass a law permitting the federal parliament to alter the line of succession for the Commonwealth and all the states. However, Queensland Premier Campbell Newman disagreed, citing Section 7 of the Australia Act 1986 and concluding from it that each state is sovereign and each should therefore pass its own legislation affecting the succession laws in its jurisdiction. Accordingly, the Queensland state government introduced its own Succession to the Crown Bill in the Legislative Assembly of Queensland on 13 February 2013. The federal government stated that if Queensland were to proceed, it would override the state's legislation in favour of national legislation. Following an agreement at a COAG meeting in April 2013, Queensland on 2 May amended its bill to add permission for the Commonwealth to act and the bill passed the same day.

In November 2014, during a debate on the Succession to the Crown Bill in Western Australia, when the then Premier Colin Barnett was asked why Western Australia was taking so long to proceed with the necessary legislation, he replied: "I concede that it has taken a while, but there has been no particular reason for that. Western Australia had an election, and I guess that slowed things down a little bit, and in a practical sense, given that the immediacy had gone out of the matter and given that the next three people in line to the monarchy are males, it did not arise." In February 2015 the Attorney-General, Michael Mischin, acknowledged "it is significantly overdue but that is just one of the facts of life". Western Australia finally passed its legislation on 3 March 2015. The Australian parliament passed the Succession to the Crown Act on 19 March 2015 and royal assent was granted on 24 March 2015. The change to the succession law in the United Kingdom finally came into effect on 26 March 2015.

The Northern Territory government introduced a bill to request the federal parliament to change the law relating to royal succession in similar terms. On second reading it was explained that the Northern Territory's request or consent to the federal parliament enactment was not constitutionally necessary but that the government of the Northern Territory considered it desirable that arrangements in the Northern Territory would mirror those between the Australian Commonwealth and its states.

=== Canada ===
The Act of Settlement 1701, the Bill of Rights 1689, and His Majesty's Declaration of Abdication Act 1936 are part of the laws of Canada.

The Canadian government's Succession to the Throne Act, 2013, with the long title An Act to assent to alterations in the law touching the Succession to the Throne, 2013, was tabled in the House of Commons of Canada as Bill C-53 on 31 January 2013 and passed by that body on 4 February. It was then approved by the Senate on 26 March 2013 and received royal assent on the following day. It came into force on 26 March 2015.

The act gives assent to Succession to the Crown Bill 2013 that had been laid before the United Kingdom parliament (later, after amendment, to be given royal assent there on 25 April 2013 as the Succession to the Crown Act 2013). The position taken by the federal Cabinet was that Canada has no royal succession laws, the country's monarch being automatically whoever is monarch of the United Kingdom, and the Canadian parliament need only assent to the changes made to the laws of succession in the United Kingdom by that realm's parliament, which can be achieved by ordinary legislation, without the approval of the provinces. There was disagreement over this process, mainly on whether the rules of succession involved the office of the Queen, thus requiring a constitutional amendment under Section 41(a) of the Constitution Act, 1982; whether, by the principle of either received law, by statute law, or both, the Bill of Rights 1689, the Act of Settlement, and the conventions related to royal succession were a part of the Canadian constitution; and whether the Canadian law assented to the Succession to the Crown Bill 2012 as had been presented to the United Kingdom parliament or as amended by that body and passed into law.

==== Judicial review ====
There was some speculation in the press before the birth of Prince George of Cambridge about Canada having a different line of succession to the other realms if the Canadian law were eventually found to be unconstitutional.

An application was made to the Ontario Superior Court of Justice seeking to find the Succession to the Throne Act, 2013, unconstitutional due to allegedly contravening both section 2 of the Canada Act 1982 and section 15 of the Charter of Rights and Freedoms. The charter challenge was dismissed as non-justiciable in August 2013. In August 2014, the Court of Appeal for Ontario upheld the lower court decision on the ground that succession rules are not subject to the charter of rights and that the applicant had no standing to bring the challenge as he has no connection with the royal family.

The validity of the Canadian parliament's legislation came under judicial review in the Quebec Superior Court over, among other matters, its alleged failure to "follow the amending procedure" set out in section 41 of the Constitution Act, 1982. The attorney-general of Quebec joined as an intervener in support of the challenge. The court hearing began on 1 June 2015. On 16 February 2016, the court ruled Canada "did not have to change its laws nor its Constitution for the British royal succession rules to be amended and effective". The ruling was appealed by the plaintiffs and was heard by the Quebec Court of Appeal in February 2018. The court released its decision upholding the lower court judgement on 28 October 2019. In December 2019, the appellants filed an application with the Supreme Court of Canada seeking leave to appeal the Quebec Court of Appeal's decision. In April 2020, the Supreme Court declined to grant leave to appeal, bringing the matter to an end.

=== New Zealand ===
The Bill of Rights 1688 and Act of Settlement 1701 are, and The Royal Marriages Act 1772 was, part of the laws of New Zealand.

The Royal Succession Bill was introduced to the Parliament of New Zealand by Justice Minister Judith Collins on 18 February 2013 and received royal assent on 17 December 2013. The act removed the Royal Marriages Act 1772 as a law of New Zealand and amended the Bill of Rights 1688 and Act of Settlement 1701, as well as the Imperial Laws Application Act 1988.

=== United Kingdom ===
On 4 December 2012, the British deputy prime minister Nick Clegg announced that the government would introduce a bill to parliament as soon as possible. The bill was introduced to parliament on 13 December 2012 and passed the House of Commons on 28 January 2013. The House of Lords Constitution Committee opposed the government's plans to fast-track the bill, which led to the government's decision to observe normal legislative time limits in the House of Lords. The act received royal assent on 25 April 2013, passing into law, but its provisions altering the law of succession would not come into force until a time to be formally appointed by the Lord President of the Council (another office held by Clegg). When publishing the proposed legislation the government had announced that it was expecting to bring the provisions into force at the same time as the other realms would be bringing into force any changes to their legislation or other changes necessary for them to implement the Perth Agreement.

=== Caribbean realms ===
According to the Lord Wallace of Tankerness, who sponsored the British government's Succession to the Crown Bill in the House of Lords, the governments of Jamaica and Belize had outlined that neither country would require domestic legislation to give effect to changes to the lines of succession to their thrones, as those lines were left by Belize's and Jamaica's constitutions to law of the United Kingdom. Wallace said on 13 March 2013 that the British government expected that the parliaments of Jamaica and Belize would not be consulted further by their governments.

Of Antigua and Barbuda, Barbados, the Bahamas, Grenada, Saint Lucia, Saint Vincent and the Grenadines, and Saint Kitts and Nevis, it was also said by Lord Wallace of Tankerness: "We believe that it would be open to the other Caribbean realms to take a similar view [as Jamaica and Belize], but it is, of course, for them to decide how best to give the changes effect." The parliament of Barbados passed the Succession to the Throne Act, 2013, which signified the legislature's acquiescence to the British Succession to the Crown Bill 2013.

=== Other Pacific realms ===
On 13 March 2013, Lord Wallace of Tankerness said that the countries of Papua New Guinea, Tuvalu, and the Solomon Islands would not require amendments to their constitutions as the wording of each explicitly state that the heirs and successors to the monarch in each realm are the same as those to the monarch of the United Kingdom. Papua New Guinea's and the Solomon Islands' constitutions both state that the references to the Queen "extend to Her Majesty's heirs and successors in the sovereignty of the United Kingdom of Great Britain and Northern Ireland", while Tuvalu's constitution states that "[t]he provisions of this Constitution referring to the Sovereign extend, in accordance with section 13 (references to the Sovereign of Tuvalu) of Schedule 1, to the Heirs and Successors of the Sovereign according to law" and a reference to the sovereign of Tuvalu "shall be read as including a reference to (a) the Sovereign of the United Kingdom; or (b) any person exercising the whole or the relevant part of the sovereignty of the United Kingdom, as the case requires, in accordance with the law in force in England."

=== Changes effected ===
The prime ministers' commitment to bring forward measures for the changes to be effective simultaneously was accomplished on 26 March 2015 by orders commencing the legislation passed in seven of the realms: Australia, Barbados, Canada, New Zealand, St Kitts and Nevis, St Vincent and the Grenadines, and the United Kingdom. The remaining realms (Antigua and Barbuda, Bahamas, Belize, Grenada, Jamaica, Papua New Guinea, St Lucia, Solomon Islands, and Tuvalu) concluded that legislation was not necessary. However, in Canada the legislation was challenged in court (see Judicial review above) and the matter remained pending until April 2020.

== Timetable ==
Realm	Parliamentary progress	Royal assent
Antigua and Barbuda	Realm's government asserted that domestic legislation was not required to implement the changes.	
Australia	Succession to the Crown Act 2015, passed 19 March 2015.	24 March 2015
New South Wales	Succession to the Crown (Request) Act 2013, passed 25 June 2013.	1 July 2013
Queensland	Succession to the Crown Act 2013, passed 2 May 2013, altering the succession and requesting that the Parliament of Australia do the same.	14 May 2013
South Australia	Succession to the Crown (Request) Act 2014, passed on 17 June 2014.	26 June 2014
Tasmania	Succession to the Crown (Request) Act 2013, passed 29 August 2013.	12 September 2013
(Victoria (state)) Victoria	Succession to the Crown (Request) Act 2013, passed on 17 October 2013.	22 October 2013
Western Australia	Succession to the Crown Act 2015, passed on 24 February 2015, altering the succession and requesting that the Parliament of Australia do the same.	3 March 2015
The Bahamas	Realm's government asserted that domestic legislation was not required to implement the changes.	
Barbados	Succession to the Throne Bill passed in the House of Assembly on 15 November 2013. Passed by the Senate on 20 November 2013.	21st, November 2013
Belize	Realm's government asserted that domestic legislation was not required to implement the changes.	
Canada	Succession to the Throne Act, 2013, passed 26 March 2013. Challenged in court in Ontario and Quebec; matter came to an end in April 2020 after several rulings against the plaintiffs, when Supreme Court of Canada denied leave to appeal the Quebec Court of Appeal's decision.	27 March 2013
Grenada	Realm's government asserted that domestic legislation was not required to implement the changes.	
Jamaica	Realm's government asserted that domestic legislation was not required to implement the changes.	
New Zealand	Royal Succession Act 2013 (Bill 99-1), passed 10 December 2013.	17 December 2013
Papua New Guinea	Realm's government asserted that domestic legislation was not required to implement the changes.	
Saint Kitts and Nevis	Succession to the Crown Bill, passed 8 July 2013.	Yes
Saint Lucia	Realm's government asserted that domestic legislation was not required to implement the changes.	
Saint Vincent and the Grenadines	Succession To The Crown Act 2013, passed 3 July 2013	4 July 2013
Solomon Islands	Realm's government asserted that domestic legislation was not required to implement the changes.	
Tuvalu	Realm's government asserted that domestic legislation was not required to implement the changes.	
United Kingdom	Succession to the Crown Act 2013, passed 22 April 2013.	25 April 2013

== See also ==
- Royal Succession Bills and Acts
