= Charter of the Commonwealth =

2012 charter stating the values of the Commonwealth of Nations

The Charter of the Commonwealth is a charter setting out the values of the Commonwealth of Nations as well as the commitment of its 56 member states to equal rights, democracy, and so on. It was proposed at the 2011 CHOGM in Perth, Australia, adopted on 19 December 2012 and officially signed by Queen Elizabeth II at Marlborough House, London, on the Commonwealth Day on 11 March 2013.

A total of sixteen core beliefs are drawn up in the charter, namely, democracy, human rights, international peace and security, tolerance, respect and understanding, freedom of expression, separation of powers, rule of law, good governance, sustainable development, protecting the environment, access to health, education, food and shelter, gender equality, importance of young people in the Commonwealth, recognition of the needs of the small states, recognition of the needs of the vulnerable states, and lastly, the role of civil society.
