= O'Donohue v Canada =

Legal challenge

- Court: Ontario Superior Court of Justice
- Decided: June 26, 2003
- Defendants: Her Majesty the Queen in right of Canada, Her Majesty the Queen in right of Ontario
- Plaintiff: Tony O'Donohue

O'Donohue v Canada was a legal challenge to the exclusion of Roman Catholics from the throne of Canada. The applicant sought a declaratory judgment that certain provisions of the Act of Settlement 1701 violate the equality-rights section of the Canadian Charter of Rights and Freedoms. In 2003 the Ontario Superior Court of Justice dismissed the case, finding the matter non-justiciable. In 2005 that decision was upheld on appeal.

The application was brought by Tony O'Donohue, a civil engineer, former Toronto City Councillor, a founding member of Republic Now, and, at the time, a member of Citizens for a Canadian Republic, after over two decades of pursuing reform of the succession by constitutional amendment.

At the time of the legal challenge, Canada's head of state was Elizabeth II, Queen of Canada, a legally distinct position from the Queen of the United Kingdom, though embodied in the same person. As a sovereign nation, Canada is free to alter its own laws, but its constitution includes the 1931 Statute of Westminster, which set out the convention that all of the Commonwealth realms must have symmetrical lines of succession to the throne, to maintain the unity of the Crown. Thus the constitutional law that predominantly governs the line of succession to the throne, the 1701 Act of Settlement, must remain identical to the same law in the other realms, including the United Kingdom. The Act of Settlement, in turn, forbids Catholics from becoming King or Queen of Canada.

O'Donohue argued that this law was discriminatory, and attempted to have it repealed. As a sovereign country, Canada, it was argued, should be free to change any laws regarding who becomes the country's head of state. The Court File (NO.: 01-CV-217147CM) stated:

The applicant. Tony O'Donohue, has brought the present application for a declaration that certain provisions of the Act of Settlement, 1710 [sic], are of no force or effect as they discriminate against Roman Catholics in violation of the equality provisions of the Canadian Charter of Rights and Freedoms. Pursuant to the order of Mr. Justice Spiegel dated May 29, 2002. only the issues of standing and justiciability are to be dealt with at this point. Should I grant the applicant standing and find justiciability the matter will proceed to be heard on the merits; if not, the application will be struck.

== Judgment ==
On June 26, 2003 the Ontario Superior Court of Justice ruled in favour of the respondents—who were named as Her Majesty the Queen in right of Canada, Her Majesty the Queen in right of Ontario. The judgement was subsequently upheld by the Court of Appeal for Ontario on March 16, 2005. It read as follows:

[36] "The impugned positions of the Act of Settlement are an integral part of the rules of succession that govern the selection of the monarch of Great Britain. By virtue of our constitutional structure whereby Canada is united under the Crown of Great Britain, the same rules of succession must apply for the selection of the King or Queen of Canada and the King or Queen of Great Britain. As stated by Prime Minister St. Laurent to the House of Commons during the debate on the bill altering the royal title:

"Her Majesty is now Queen of Canada but she is the Queen of Canada because she is Queen of the United Kingdom ... It is not a separate office ... it is the sovereign who is recognized as the sovereign of the United Kingdom who is our Sovereign" Hansard. February 3, 1953, page 1566."

[37] "These rules of succession, and the requirement that they be the same as those of Great Britain, are necessary to the proper functioning of our constitutional monarchy and, therefore, the rules are not subject to Charter scrutiny."

[38] "In the present case the court is being asked to apply the Charter not to rule on the validity of acts or decisions of the Crown, one of the branches of our government, but rather to disrupt the core of how the monarchy functions, namely the rules by which succession is determined. To do this would make the constitutional principle of Union under the British Crown together with other Commonwealth countries unworkable, would defeat a manifest intention expressed in the preamble of our Constitution, and would have the courts overstep their role in our democratic structure."

[39] In conclusion, the lis raised in the present application is not justiciable and there is no serious issue to be tried. Public interest standing should not be granted. Given my ruling on these issues I need not deal with the other considerations that apply to the granting of public interest standing. The application is dismissed."

== See also ==
- List of Canadian lower court cases
