= Tony O'Donohue =

Canadian politician (1933–2022)

Toronto City Councillor for Parkdale (Ward 3/4)
- In office 1980–1994
- Preceded by: Art Eggleton
- Succeeded by: Mario Silva

Toronto City Councillor for Parkdale (Ward 2)
- In office 1974–1978
- Preceded by: Archie Chisholm
- Succeeded by: Tony Ruprecht

Toronto City Councillor for Trinity-Bellwoods (Ward 4/5)
- In office 1966–1972
- Preceded by: Joe Piccininni
- Succeeded by: Art Eggleton

Personal details
- Born: March 22, 1933 The Burren, County Clare, Ireland
- Died: February 20, 2022 (aged 88)
- Spouse: Aldona O'Donohue
- Occupation: Professional engineer

Anthony Edward O'Donohue (March 22, 1933 – February 20, 2022) was a municipal politician in Toronto, Ontario, Canada.

== Early life ==
Born in The Burren, County Clare, Ireland, O'Donohue graduated as a civil engineer from University College, Galway in 1954. He moved to Toronto in 1956 to pursue his profession as a municipal engineer designing urban services such as roads, water supply, sewage treatment, storm water run-off and waste management.

Inspired by Prime Minister Lester B. Pearson's initiative for a new flag for Canada, O'Donohue joined the Young Liberals in the early 1960s and made many trips to Ottawa with other Young Liberals to support the new flag proposal. As one of the party's first advocates for environmental causes, he encouraged the Young Liberals to become active in environmental issues. His Liberal Party national convention papers on water supply and sewage treatment received national attention.

== City Council ==
He was elected as a Toronto City Council alderman in the 1966 municipal election. As an engineer, he focused on the need for a clearer understanding of the environment and, as a reformer, encouraged a new approach to local politics. He ran for Toronto mayor in 1972, losing to David Crombie, and again in 1978 to John Sewell. His 1978 defeat to the left-wing Sewell was seen as a result of vote splitting between O'Donohue and David Smith, a Liberal.

Tony O'Donohue was the true pioneer of environmental issues in municipal politics in Canada. He made it a key issue many years before the public considered it important. Canadians owe him a true debt of gratitude.

— Paul V. Godfrey, Former Chairman, Municipality of Metropolitan Toronto

O'Donohue and colleague Art Eggleton had agreed that only one of them should run against Sewell for mayor in 1980. They were to conduct a public opinion poll to determine which of them had the better chance of toppling the incumbent Mayor. However, according to O'Donohue's memoirs, Eggleton broke the pact and unilaterally declared himself a mayoralty candidate forcing O'Donohue to stay out of the race in order not to split the vote.

O'Donohue was returned to City Council following a by-election after the death of City Councillor George Ben in 1980. He spent the next 14 years working to address the many energy and environmental problems facing urban areas.

In April 1989, O'Donohue moved a by-law at City Council to ban the manufacture, sale, distribution and use of ozone depleting substances. It was the first such legislation anywhere and became a model for other cities. As a result, he was invited to make a presentation on the Toronto by-law at the Beckman Institute of the National Academies of Science and Engineering, in Irvine, California. While there, he consulted world-renowned chemist and later Nobel laureate Frank Sherwood Rowland on how to help prevent the dumping of ozone depleting substances into the atmosphere.

In 1992, he presented a motion to City Council to adopt a by-law prohibiting anyone from lying, sleeping or blocking city sidewalks. He argued that the city paid millions of dollars to make sufficient beds available for the homeless and there was no need for anyone to lie or sleep on the sidewalks. The motion lost and sleeping on the sidewalks has remained part of the landscape in downtown Toronto streets.

In the 1994 Toronto municipal election, he was defeated in Ward 3 by 28-year-old Mario Silva. The result was very close and subject to several recounts before the Ontario Court of Appeal ruled that Silva had won by 15 votes.

== After politics ==
Since leaving politics, O'Donohue operated his own company until 2004, Environmental Probe Ltd., which helped developers fulfil the requirements of environmental assessments and laws.

O'Donohue's son, Daniel, works for the city of Toronto as an evaluator of expropriated land.

== Republicanism ==
An active supporter of replacing the British monarch with a Canadian head of state, he was a member of Citizens for a Canadian Republic, before founding Republic Now and joining its executive board. O'Donohue made news in 2002 as a result of his legal challenge to the Act of Settlement barring Roman Catholics from the throne of Canada. He filed an application to the Ontario Superior Court, O'Donohue v. Her Majesty The Queen, calling on the court to strike down the discriminatory sections of the act as being in violation of the Canadian Charter of Rights and Freedoms. His case was dismissed in 2003 and his appeal was subsequently denied.

In the present case the court is being asked to apply the Charter not to rule on the validity of acts or decisions of the Crown, one of the branches of our government, but rather to disrupt the core of how the monarchy functions... To do this would make the constitutional principle of Union under the British Crown together with other Commonwealth countries unworkable, would defeat a manifest intention expressed in the preamble of our Constitution, and would have the courts overstep their role in our democratic structure... In conclusion, the lis raised in the present application is not justiciable and there is no serious issue to be tried. Public interest standing should not be granted. Given my ruling on these issues I need not deal with the other considerations that apply to the granting of public interest standing. The application is dismissed."

— Ontario Superior Court of Justice

== Toronto Atmospheric Fund ==
Following the Changing Atmosphere Conference in July, 1988, O’Donohue embarked a plan to make Toronto a leading world city in urban environmental issues. He convinced City Council to apply to the province for special legislation to set up the Toronto Atmospheric Fund (TAF). In December 1992, approval was given.

As a member of the City Executive Committee, O’Donohue convinced City Council that $23 million – 20% of the moneys received by the City from the sale of its Jail Farm – should be given to TAF and he was appointed chairman.

== See also ==
- Monarchy in Canada
- Canadian republicanism

== Works ==
- Front Row Centre (2000) Abbeyfield Publishers. ISBN 1-894584-03-1
- The Tale of a City - Re-Engineering the Urban Environment (2005) Dundurn Press. ISBN 1-55002-556-2
