= Royal succession bills and acts =

Proposed legislation to determine the legal line of succession

Royal Succession bills and acts are laws or pieces of proposed legislation to determine the legal line of succession to the Monarchy of the United Kingdom.

A Succession to the Crown Bill is a proposed piece of legislation in the United Kingdom, presented as a Private Members Bill or government bill, in either the House of Commons or House of Lords, which aims to alter the laws of succession to the UK Monarchy.

The Crown is a corporation sole that represents the legal embodiment of executive, legislative, or judicial governance. It evolved as a separation of the literal crown and property of the nation state from the person and personal property of the monarch. In this context it should not be confused with any physical crown.

A bill is a proposed law under consideration by a legislature. A bill is not law until passed by the legislature and, in most cases, approved by the executive, Privy Council and monarch by royal assent. Once a bill is enacted into law it is called an "act" or "statute".

== Background to succession laws ==
Numerous Bills and Acts of succession were used to determine heirs and potential heirs to the throne, during the reign of the incumbent monarch, and especially before, during and after the changeovers between the Tudors, Stuarts, Hanoverians, and Saxe-Coburg and Gotha to the present Windsors, all of which necessitated changes and amendments to prior succession legislation to accommodate circumstances of the day. Historically and presently, legislation to amend laws of succession generally argue for amendments to several historic acts, adjudged relevant to succession issues of the day. The Bill of Rights 1688 and the Coronation Oath Act 1688, the Act of Settlement 1700, the Union with Scotland Act 1706, the Sophia Naturalization Act 1705 and Princess Sophia's Precedence Act 1711, the Royal Marriages Act 1772, the Union with Ireland Act 1800, the Accession Declaration Act 1910 and the Regency Act 1937. The 1937 Regency Act came into legislative existence as a consequence of the abdication of King Edward VIII, as such passing succession to his brother Albert Duke of York (King George VI) in 1937, who was succeeded by his daughter Queen Elizabeth II in 1952.

== Legislative procedures of bills ==
A representation of the legislative procedure.

Pre-legislative scrutiny: Joint committee of both houses review bill and vote on amendments that government can accept or reject. Reports are influential in later stages as rejected committee recommendations are revived to be voted on.

First Reading: No vote occurs. Bill is presented, printed, and in private members' bills, a Second Reading date is set.

Second Reading: A debate on the general principles of the bill is followed by a vote.

Committee Stage: A committee considers each clause of the bill, and may make amendments.

Report Stage: An opportunity to amend the bill. The House consider clauses to which amendments have been tabled.

Third Reading: A debate on final text as amended. In the Lords, further amendments may be tabled at this stage.

Passage: The bill is then sent to the other House which may amend it.

First Reading: Same procedures

Second Reading: Same procedures

Committee Stage: Same procedures

Report Stage: Same procedures

Third Reading: Same procedures

Passage: The bill is then returned to the original House.

Pre-legislative Scrutiny to consider all amendments.

The bill is then processed for royal assent, if accepted, the bill becomes an Act.

Making new law Types of bill Bill procedure First reading Second reading Commons committee stage Lords committee stage Report stage Third reading Passage through the other House Royal assent Delegated legislation

== Modern bills and acts of succession ==
=== Elizabeth II ===
The Succession to the Crown Bill 2004 was a British Private Member's Bill aimed at reforming the manner of succession to the British monarchy published in the House of Lords by Labour peer Lord Dubs on 9 December 2004, and withdrawn by him on 14 January 2005, after the Government said that it would block the Bill. The most immediate effect of the Bill passing and becoming law would have been the moving of Princess Anne from her then position of ninth on the line of succession to the British throne to fourth, displacing Prince Andrew, Duke of York. The Bill drew on the recommendations of the Fabian Society's Commission on the Future of the Monarchy, which reported in 2003.

The Succession to the Crown Bill 2011 was introduced to the House of Commons on 18 January 2011 by Labour MP Keith Vaz under the Ten Minute Rule, and was intended to "remove any distinction between the sexes in determining the succession of the throne" by replacing the current system of male primogeniture in succeeding to the throne of the United Kingdom with absolute cognatic primogeniture. It was due to have received its Second Reading on 9 September, however, the second reading did not occur on that date, and was instead rescheduled for 25 November 2011. On 28 October 2011, it was announced by the heads of government of the 16 Commonwealth realms which share Elizabeth II as head of state that such a change in the law will soon be effected in all 16 independent nations, including the United Kingdom. Prime Minister David Cameron said that an Act of Parliament will amend the Act of Settlement 1701, the Royal Marriages Act 1772 and the Bill of Rights 1689 to establish absolute cognatic primogeniture for the descendants of Charles, Prince of Wales. The announcement in December 2012 that the Duchess of Cambridge was expecting her first child led to the publication of a new, government sponsored Succession to the Crown Bill.

The Succession to the Crown Act 2013 is a piece of legislation in the United Kingdom which altered the laws of succession to the British throne. It was published on 13 December 2012 and received royal assent on 25 April 2013. Known as the Perth Agreement, on 28 October 2011, at a Commonwealth Heads of Government Meeting held in Perth, Western Australia, heads of government of 16 Commonwealth realms, which shared Queen Elizabeth II as head of state, announced that they would introduce legislation to end the primacy of male children over female in the succession to the Crown. The Succession to the Crown Bill gave effect in the United Kingdom to the agreement between heads of government.

The argument for changing the law on succession could be stated simply: The law as it stood was considered to discriminate against women and Catholics. The Government has said that it opposes discrimination in all forms, including against Catholics. However, numerous attempts to alter the succession to remove such clauses through Private Member's bills had not been successful, and the Government thus brought forward its own legislation on the matter. Consequently, to change the law, the government sought and received consent of the fifteen Commonwealth countries that had the Queen as their head of state, under the preamble to the Statute of Westminster 1931. Amending old legislation fundamental to the British constitution raised further questions about the nature of the established church and the Union between England and Scotland.

Bill title and summary of bill	Proposer	Premiership	Originating house	Progress
Private Members' bills
Succession to the Crown Bill 1981-82; To amend the law with respect to the succession to the Crown.	Michael English MP (Labour)	Thatcher (Conservative)	Commons	
Constitutional Reform Bill 1990-91; To amend the law relating to the succession, rights and responsibilities of the Crown.	Simon Hughes MP (Liberal Democrats)	Thatcher (Conservative)	Commons	First Reading: 3-07-1991
Succession to the Crown Bill 1996-97; To remove any distinction between sexes in determining the succession to the Crown.	Lord Archer (Conservative)	Major (Conservative)	Lords	First Reading: 18-02-1997
Succession to the Crown Bill 1997-98; To remove any distinction between sexes in determining the succession to the Crown.	Lord Archer (Conservative)	Blair (Labour)	Lords	Withdrawn
Treason Felony, Act of Settlement and Parliamentary Oath Bill 2001-02; To provide that persons in communion with the Roman Catholic church are able to succeed to the Crown.	Kevin McNamara MP (Labour)	Blair (Labour)	Commons	First Reading: 19-12-2001
Succession to the Crown Bill 2004-05; To make provision about succession to the Crown and about Royal marriages.	Lord Dubs (Labour)	Blair (Labour)	Lords	Withdrawn
Succession to the Crown (No. 2) Bill 2004-05; To make provision about succession to the Crown and about Royal marriages.	Ann Taylor MP (Labour)	Blair (Labour)	Commons	First Reading: 19-12-2001
Succession to the Crown and Retirement of the Sovereign Bill 2004-05; To provide for Sovereigns to be chosen by House of Commons from the family of the preceding Sovereign; to provide that all such Sovereigns shall cease to be Sovereign at the age of 75.	Jonathan Sayeed MP (Conservative)	Blair (Labour)	Commons	Negatived
Royal Marriages (Freedom of Religion) Bill 2005; To allow any member of the Royal Family to marry a person of any religion or none.	Edward Leigh MP (Conservative)	Blair (Labour)	Commons	First Reading: 19-12-2001
Catholics (Prevention of Discrimination) Bill 2006-07; To remove remaining legislative discrimination against Catholics.	John Gummer MP (Conservative)	Blair (Labour)	Commons	First Reading: 19-12-2001
Royal Marriages and Succession to the Crown (Prevention of Discrimination) Bill 2008-09; To remove primogeniture from the line of succession and to enable the Monarch to marry a Catholic.	Evan Harris MP (Liberal Democrats)	Brown (Labour)	Commons	Adjourned
Succession to the Crown Bill 2010-11; To amend the Act of Settlement 1700 to remove distinction between sexes in determining succession to the Crown.	Keith Vaz MP (Labour)	Cameron (Coalition)	Commons	Adjourned
Government bill
Succession to the Crown Act 2013; To make provision about succession to the Crown and about Royal marriages.	Nick Clegg MP (Liberal Democrats)	Cameron (Coalition)	Commons	Royal assent on 25-04-2013

== Historical bills and acts of succession ==
=== Henry VIII ===
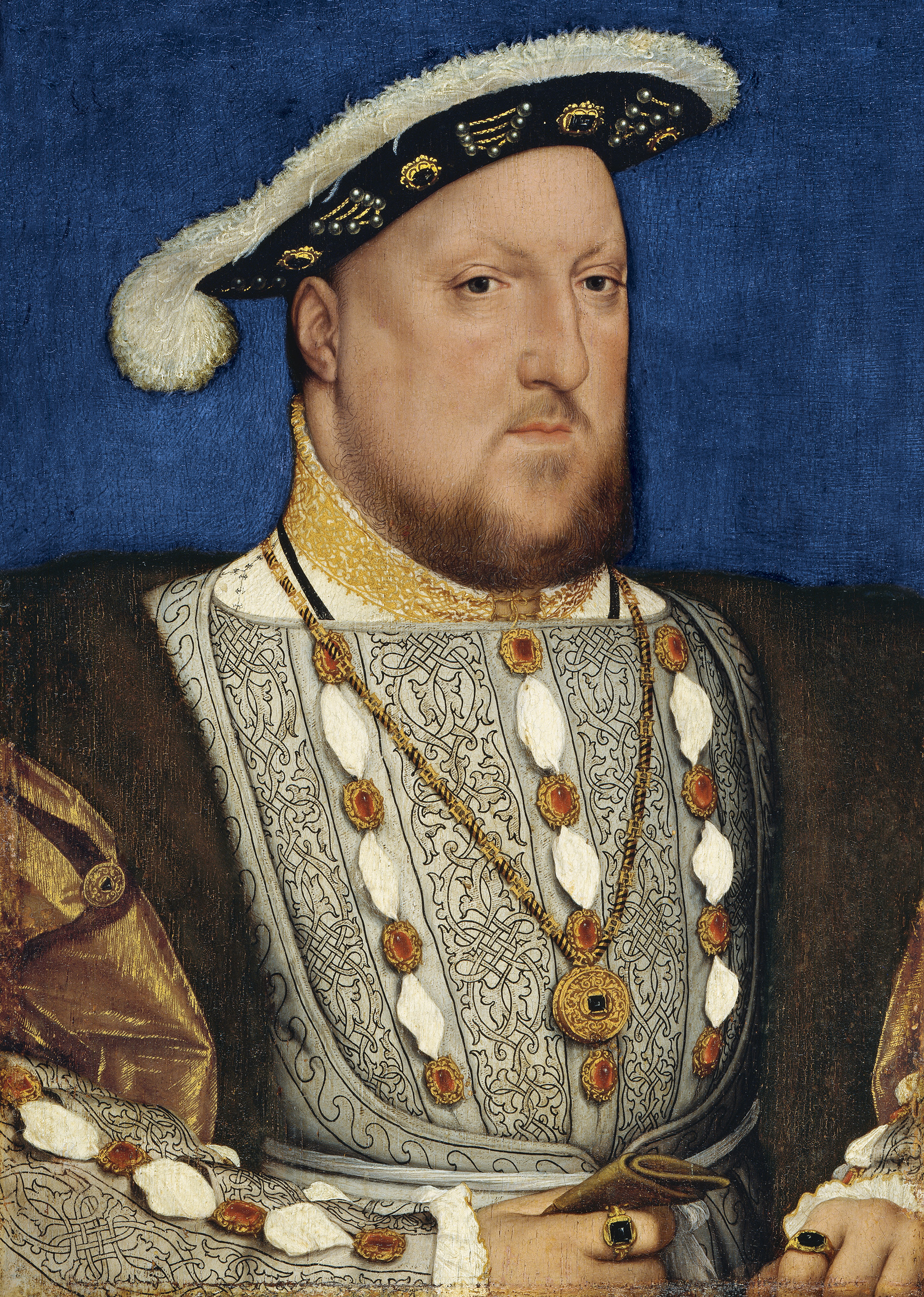
Henry VIII

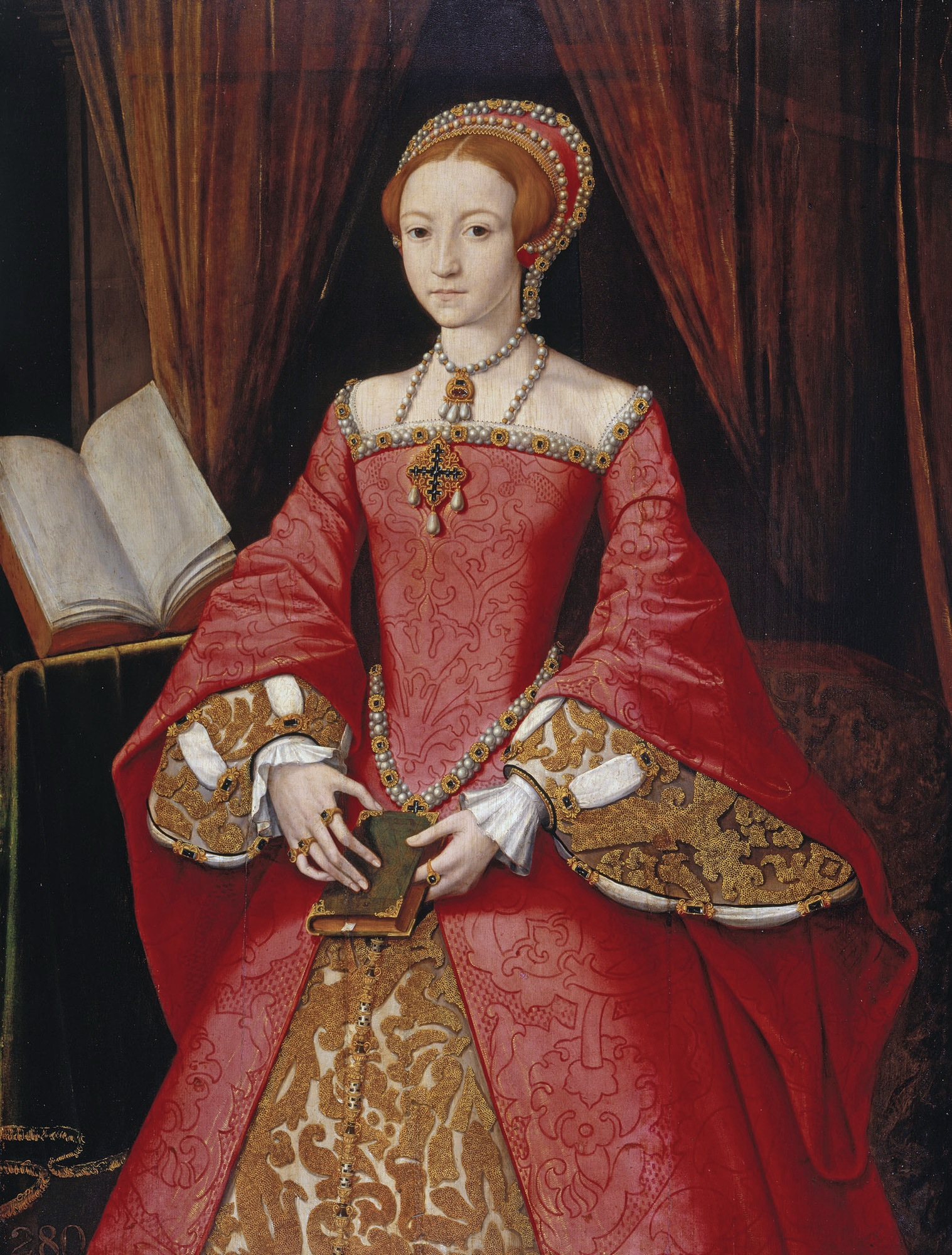
Elizabeth I

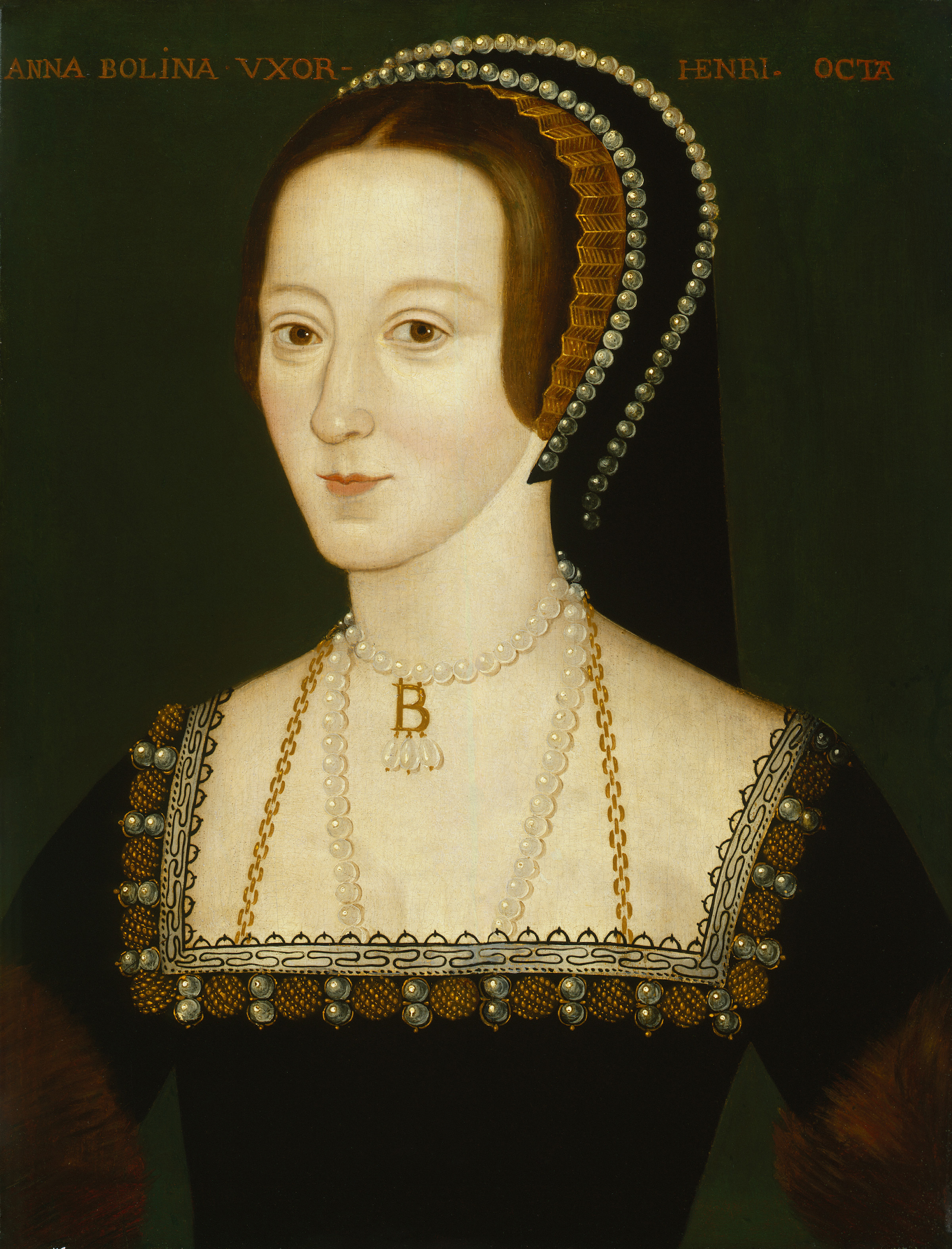
Anne Boleyn

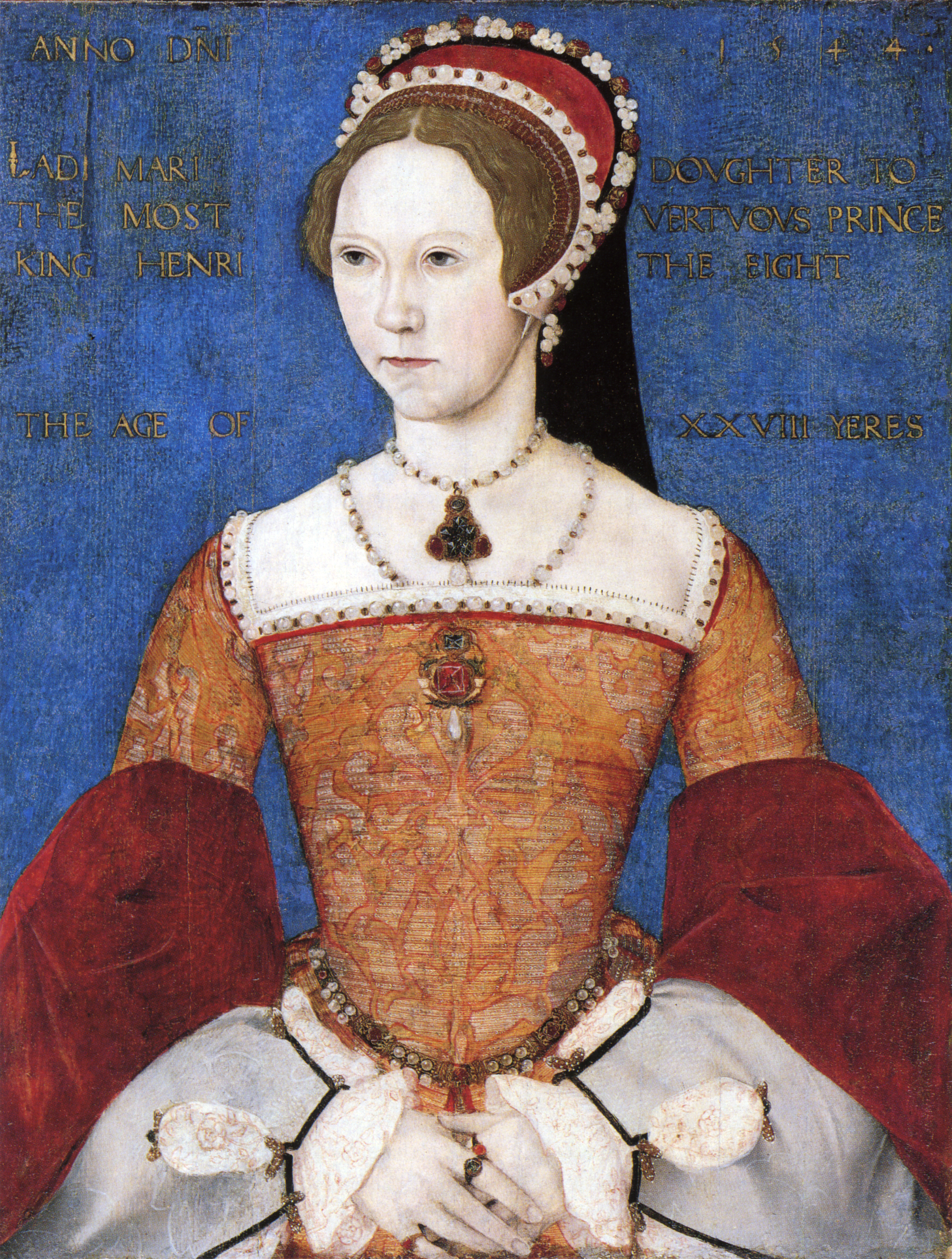
Mary I

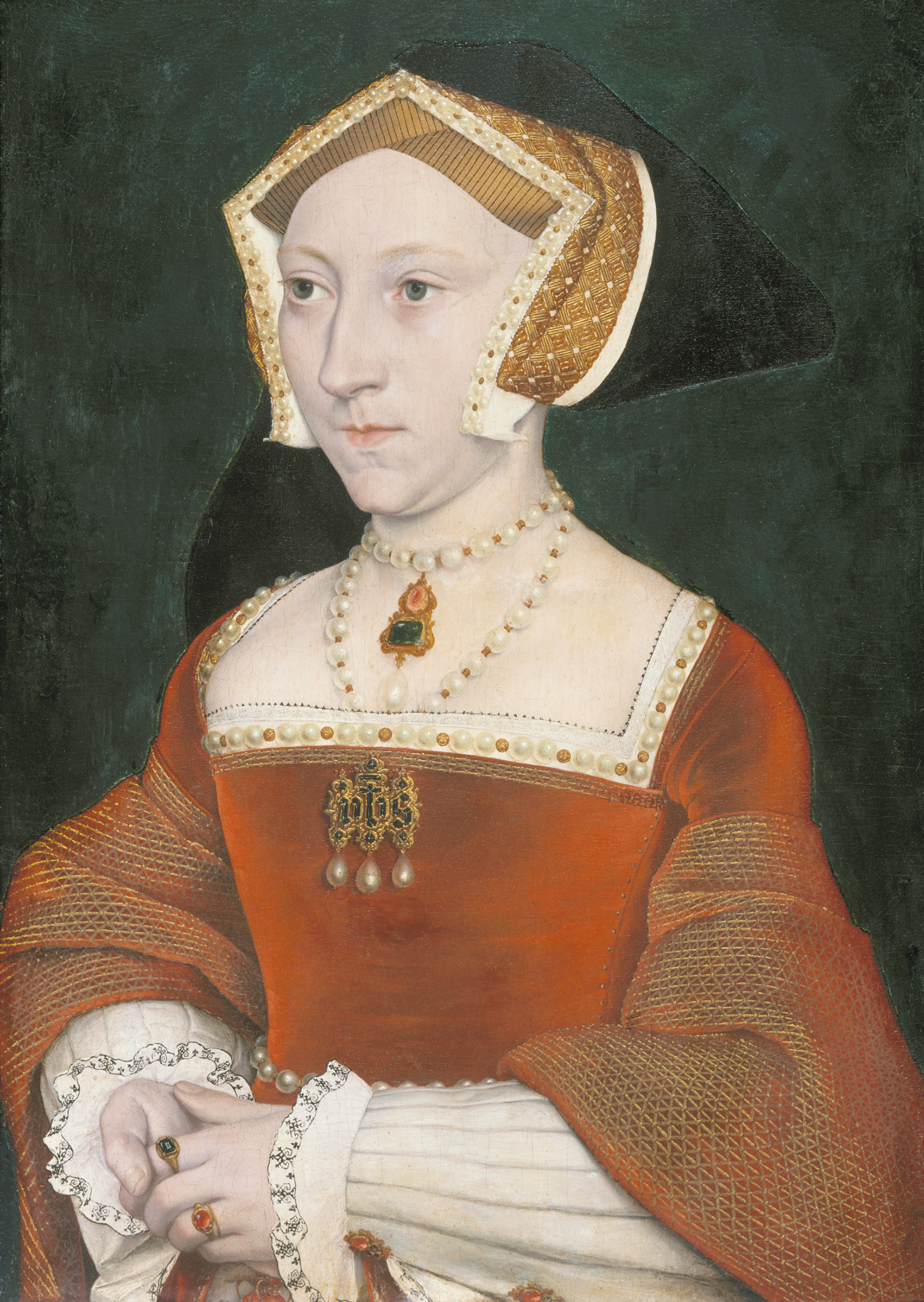
Jane Seymour

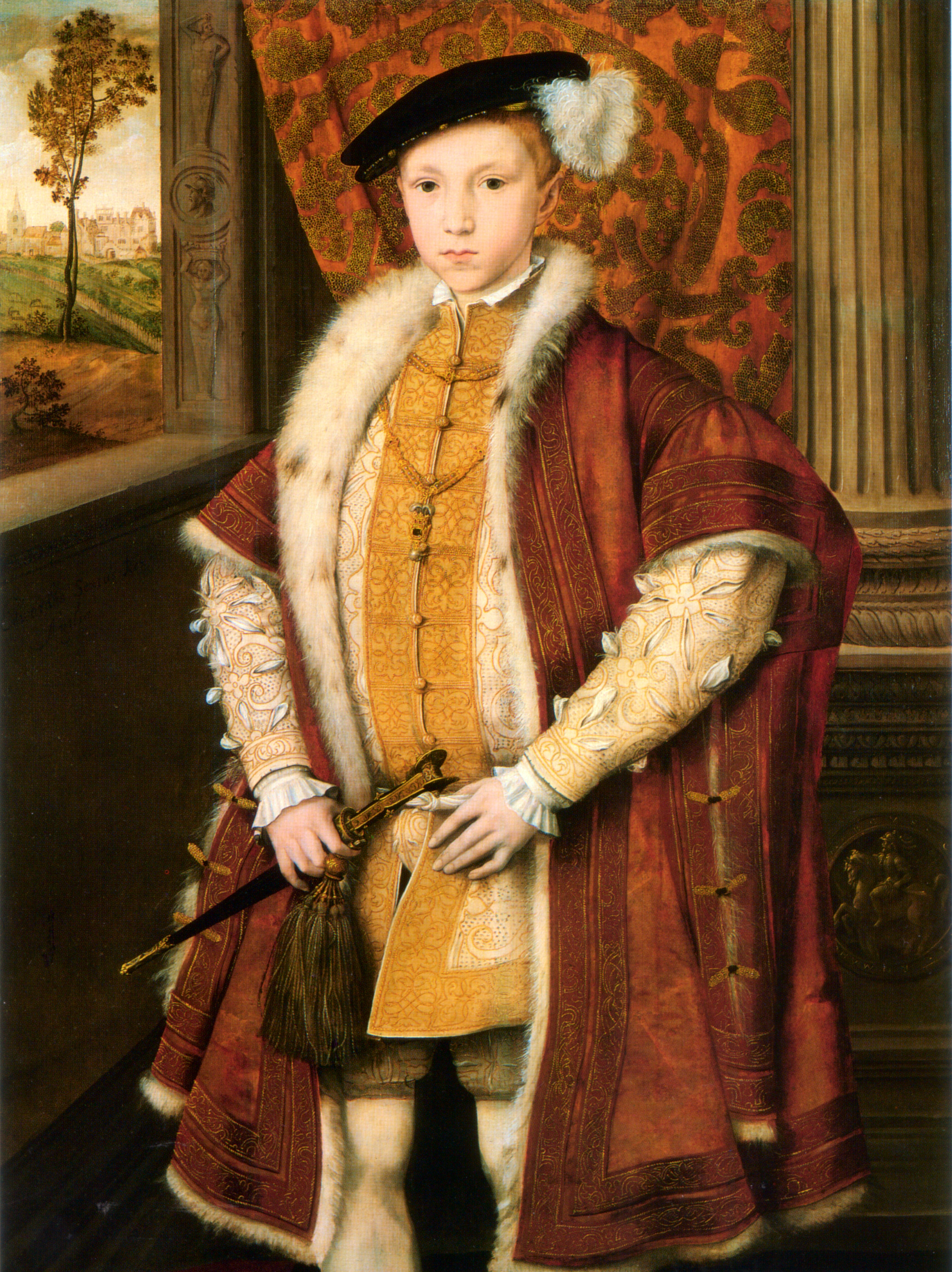
Edward VI

The First, Second and Third Succession Acts were created to determine successors of Henry VIII, in consequence of his several wives. These circumstances evoked more legislation. In response to his excommunication; that Henry's imperial crown had been diminished by "the unreasonable and uncharitable usurpations and exactions" of the Pope, the Act of Supremacy in 1534 declared that the King was "the only Supreme Head in Earth of the Church of England" and the Treasons Act 1534 made it high treason, punishable by death, to refuse to acknowledge the King as such.

On 23 March 1534, Parliament passed the First Succession Act, to vest the succession of the English Crown in the children of King Henry VIII and Anne Boleyn. This effectively set Princess Elizabeth (later Elizabeth I) first in line for the throne, declaring Princess Mary (later Mary I) a bastard. It was also proclaimed that if commanded, subjects were to swear an oath to recognizing this Act as well as the King's supremacy. People who refused to take the oath, including Sir Thomas More, were charged with treason.

The Second Succession Act of Henry VIII's reign was passed in June 1536, removing both Mary and Elizabeth from the line of the succession. This act followed the execution of Anne Boleyn, and superseded the First Succession Act. This new act now declared Elizabeth to be a bastard also. As a result, Henry was left without any legitimate child to inherit the throne until his son Prince Edward was born in October 1537.

In July 1543, Parliament passed the Third Succession Act. This act overrode the first Succession Act of 1534, and the second Succession Act of 1536. This third act, which gained royal assent at the close of Parliament in February 1544, established the new line of succession from his marriage to Jane Seymour as; Prince Edward (later Edward VI), then any children he were to have; then a son Henry VIII might have with Katherine Parr; that potential son's possible children; then children from marriages after Queen Katherine, if any; then Mary; Mary's children, if any; then Elizabeth.

=== William and Mary ===
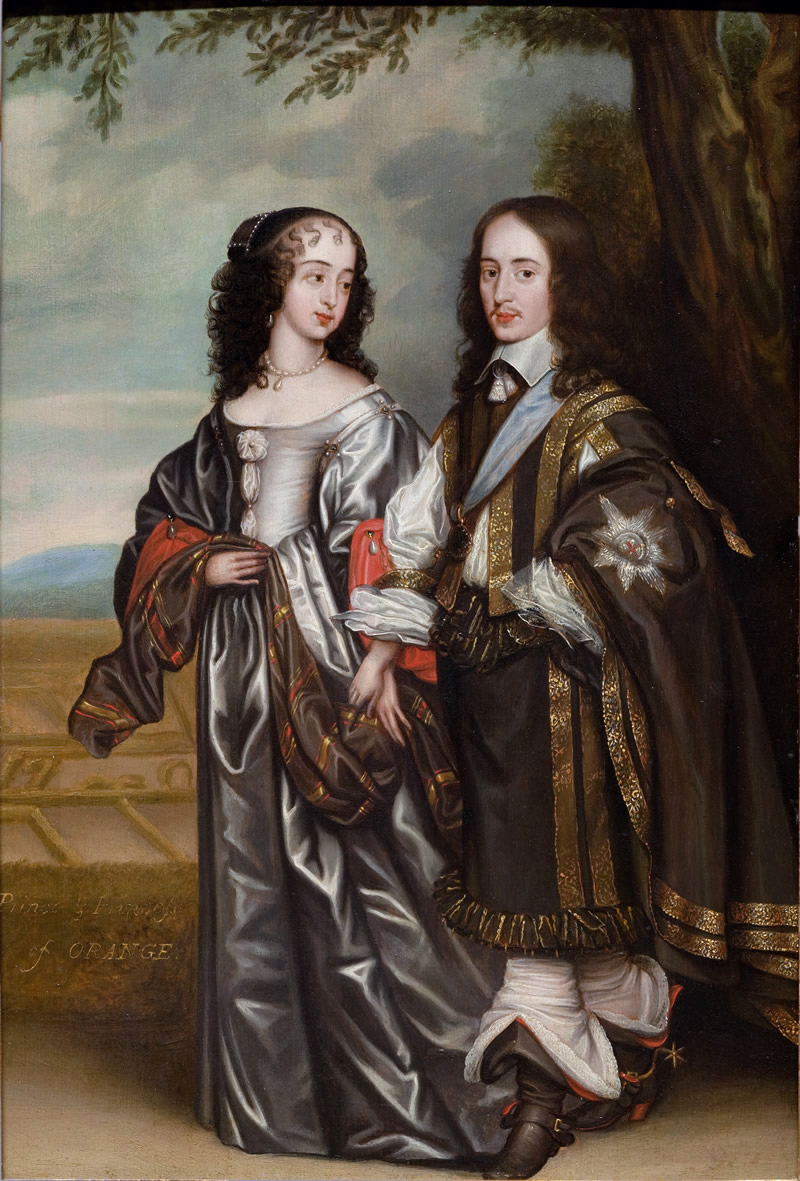
Mary II and William III

Historical precedence of prior succession acts usually determines later succession issues. There are several events in the history of royal successions showing why succession acts were necessary at the time of their creation. The Bill of Rights 1688 came about as a consequence of the circumstances after the Restoration of the Monarchy in 1660, and the successions of William III and Mary II, who became regents in return for accepting this Bill of Rights, and a new Coronation Oath Act 1688 (1 Will. & Mar. c. 6), from the Convention Parliament.

The Bill of Rights limited royal power and established the supremacy of Parliament. This rights bill also established the frequency of parliaments, freedom of speech in parliament, debates or proceedings not to be questioned out of parliament. This Bill also especially established that; "without parliamentary consent the king could not"; suspend or create laws, raise taxes by prerogative, or raise a standing army in peace time.

The Oath Act reiterated precedent that "By the Law and Ancient Usage of this Realm" monarchs of England took a solemn coronation oath to maintain the statute laws and customs of the country and of its inhabitants. This established a new coronation oath to be taken by future monarchs. This oath was different from the traditional coronation oath which recognized laws as being the grant of the King, whereas the Act's new oath sought the King to rule according to the law agreed in parliament.

=== Edward VIII ===
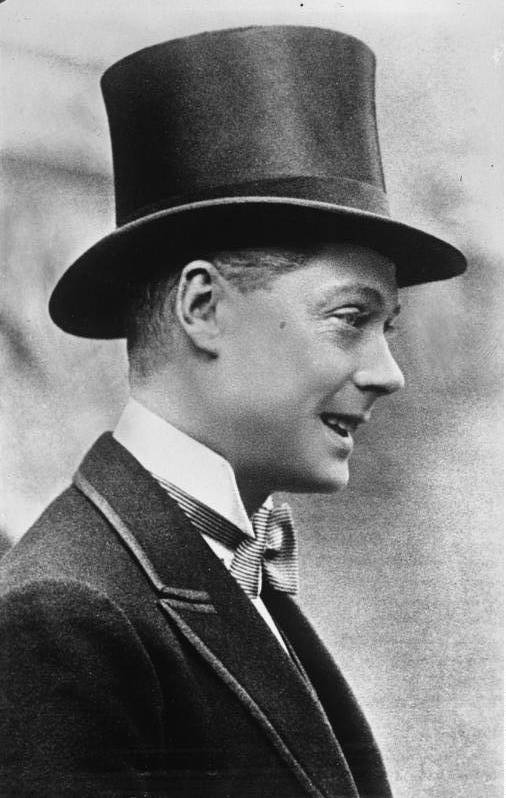
King Edward VIII

His Majesty's Declaration of Abdication Act 1936 (1 Edw. 8. & 1 Geo. 6. c. 3), was the Act of the British Parliament that recognized and ratified the abdication of King Edward VIII from the throne of the United Kingdom and the dominions of the British Commonwealth, and passed succession to his brother Prince Albert, Duke of York (who became King George VI). The Act also excluded any possible future descendants of Edward from the line of succession. Edward abdicated in order to marry his lover, Wallis Simpson, after facing opposition from the governments of the United Kingdom and the British dominions. Although Edward VIII had signed a declaration of abdication the previous day (10 December 1936), he was still King until he gave royal assent to this Act, which occurred on 11 December. The Act was passed through the Houses of Parliament in one day, with no amendments.

== See also ==
- Act Respecting the Oath to the Succession (Succession to the Crown Act 1534)
- Alternative successions of the English crown
- Church of England measures, which have the same force and effect of Acts of Parliament.
- Line of succession to the British throne
- Halsbury's Laws of England – encyclopaedic treatise on the laws of England and Wales
- Halsbury's Statutes – standard work of authority on statute law in England and Wales
- First Succession Act (Succession to the Crown Act 1533)
- Second Succession Act (Succession to the Crown: Marriage Act 1536)
- Third Succession Act (Succession to the Crown Act 1543)
