= 2011 Commonwealth Heads of Government Meeting =

22nd Commonwealth Heads of Government Meeting

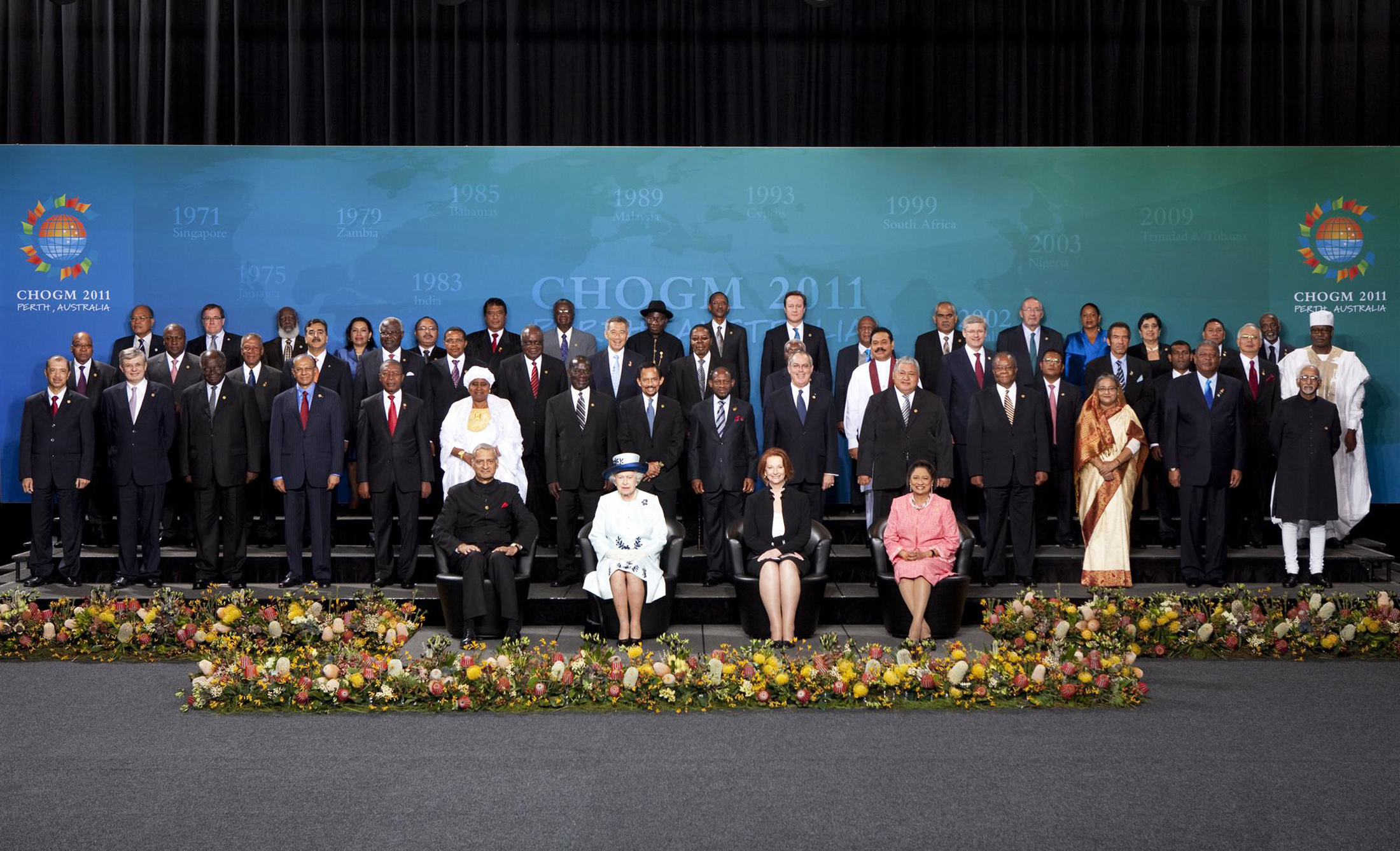
- Host country: Australia
- Dates: 28–30 October 2011
- Cities: Perth
- Venues: Kings Park
- Heads of State or Government: 36
- Chair: Julia Gillard (Prime Minister)
- Follows: 2009
- Precedes: 2013

Key points
- Changes to the succession to the throne Charter of the Commonwealth; Diamond Jubilee of Queen Elizabeth II; Human rights Future of the Commonwealth

The 2011 Commonwealth Heads of Government Meeting, commonly known as CHOGM 2011, was the 22nd Meeting of the Heads of Government of the Commonwealth of Nations. Held in Perth, Western Australia, between 28 and 30 October 2011 and hosted by Prime Minister Julia Gillard.

== Venue ==
Perth, Western Australia, hosted the conference, the first time the city hosted the event and the first time the event had been held in Australia since the 2002 meeting at Coolum, Queensland. Kings Park served as the leaders' retreat.

=== Security ===
A heavy security presence was placed in Perth with parts of the city being declared "security areas" as delegated with newly enumerated authority to clamp down on protests. In the Perth Central Business District, where the Queen was due to open the summit, nearly every street corner had a police presence. F/A-18 Hornet fighter jets of the Royal Australian Air Force also patrolled the skies.

== Opening session ==
The Head of the Commonwealth, Queen Elizabeth II, incorporated the CHOGM Official Opening into her official visit to Australia, accompanied by her husband, Prince Philip, Duke of Edinburgh. The tour lasted from 19 to 29 October and included visits to Canberra, Australian Capital Territory; Brisbane, Queensland; Melbourne, Victoria; and Perth. In attendance at the ceremony were the Queen, Prime Minister Julia Gillard, the incoming Commonwealth Chair-in-Office, Kamla Persad-Bissessar, the Prime Minister of Trinidad and Tobago and outgoing Commonwealth Chair-in-Office, the Commonwealth Secretary-General Kamalesh Sharma and a number of heads of government or heads of state from the 53 Commonwealth states.

British Prime Minister David Cameron arrived late for the summit as he was attending a European Union summit on financial bailouts.

Guy Sebastian headlined the Official Opening in Perth, performing "Agents of Change," a song he wrote especially for the event.

== Discussions ==
David Cameron announced his proposals to reform the rules governing the royal succession. Also discussed were topics on how the Commonwealth should celebrate the Diamond Jubilee of Queen Elizabeth II.

The summit considered a report by an Eminent Persons Group panel, appointed at the last CHOGM. The panel suggested the Commonwealth's relevance was lost and was further decaying due to the lack of a mechanism to censure member countries when they violated human rights or democratic norms. The panel also made 106 "urgent" recommendations including the adoption of a Charter of the Commonwealth, the creation of a new commissioner on the rule of law, democracy and human rights to track persistent human rights abuses and allegations of political repression by Commonwealth member states, recommendations for the repeal of laws against homosexuality in 41 Commonwealth states and a ban on "forced marriage."

=== Outcome ===
The other Commonwealth realm prime ministers agreed to British Prime Minister David Cameron's proposal that the rules for the royal succession be reformed. The reforms need to be approved by parliaments of all 16 realms. New Zealand was chosen to chair a working group to consider the best way of accomplishing this reform in all the countries concerned.

The summit failed to reach an agreement to endorse or even publish the Eminent Persons Group report; the United Kingdom, Australia and Canada urged the publication of the report but were opposed by India, Nigeria, Sri Lanka, South Africa and Namibia. The EPG had been commissioned at the 2009 CHOGM to make proposals for modernisation and reforms. The failure to release the report, or accept its recommendations for reforms in the area of human rights, democracy and the rule of law was decried as a "disgrace" by former British Foreign Secretary Sir Malcolm Rifkind, a member of the EPG, who told a press conference: "The Commonwealth faces a very significant problem. It's not a problem of hostility or antagonism, it's more of a problem of indifference. Its purpose is being questioned, its relevance is being questioned and part of that is because its commitment to enforce the values for which it stands is becoming ambiguous in the eyes of many member states. The Commonwealth is not a private club of the governments or the secretariat. It belongs to the people of the Commonwealth."

Abdullah Ahmad Badawi, former prime minister of Malaysia and chair of the EPG, warned "this CHOGM is expected to deliver meaningful reforms of the Commonwealth. If this CHOGM does not deliver such reforms, it is our duty to sound the caution to you that this CHOGM will be remembered not as the triumph it should be, but as a failure."

On the summit's final day it was agreed to develop a charter of values for the Commonwealth as "one clear, powerful statement" without any agreement about enforcement. Two-thirds of the EPG's 106 recommendations were referred to study groups, an act described by one EPG member as having them "kicked into the long grass." There was, however, still no agreement to create the recommended position of human rights commissioner, instead a ministerial management group was empowered with enforcement. The summit chair, Australian Prime Minister Julia Gillard, hailed the decision to develop the charter of values and adopt new rules for the ministerial management body as "major decisions" and "significant reforms." The Charter of the Commonwealth was subsequently adopted on 19 December 2012 and was officially signed by Queen Elizabeth II at Marlborough House, London, on the Commonwealth Day on 11 March 2013.

== Controversies ==
Indian Prime Minister Manmohan Singh skipped the summit in protest against Australia's refusal to sell India uranium as it had not signed the Nuclear Nonproliferation Treaty. Instead, the ceremonial vice-president, Hamid Ansari, led the Indian delegation. When reports suggested that the Commonwealth Secretariat had refused to grant Ansari head of government status and attendant protocol honours, Foreign Secretary Ranjan Mathai said that: "In our system, the vice president holds a position of great importance. He is second in the warrant of precedence." India also claimed that Singh's calendar was full, but the Commonwealth was not being snubbed as it was still relevant. Australia later denied that Singh's pull out from the summit was over its refusal to sell uranium.

Canadian Prime Minister Stephen Harper walked out of the summit during its last day when Sri Lankan President Mahinda Rajapaksa was invited to speak. He also had threatened to boycott the 2013 CHOGM summit, scheduled to be held in Sri Lanka, if allegations of human rights abuses against the country's Tamil minority were not investigated.

In response to a suggestion by the British Prime Minister David Cameron that the United Kingdom would cut off aid to any country that failed to recognise LGBT rights, President of Ghana John Atta Mills pledged to never support or initiate any attempt to legalise homosexuality in his country and decried attempts by one country to dictate the societal norms of another state.

== Participating leaders ==
Country	Representative	Position	Photograph
Commonwealth	Elizabeth II	Head of the Commonwealth	
Commonwealth	Kamalesh Sharma	Secretary-General	
Antigua and Barbuda	Baldwin Spencer	Prime Minister	
Australia	Julia Gillard (Chair-in-Office)	Prime Minister	
Bahamas	Brent Symonette	Deputy Prime Minister	
Bangladesh	Sheikh Hasina	Prime Minister	
Barbados	Freundel Stuart	Prime Minister	
Belize	Wilfred Elrington	Foreign Minister	
Botswana	Ian Khama	President	
Brunei	Hassanal Bolkiah	Sultan	
Cameroon	Philémon Yang	Prime Minister	
Canada	Stephen Harper	Prime Minister	
Cyprus	Erato Kozakou-Marcoullis	Foreign Minister	
Gambia	Isatou Njie-Saidy	Vice-President	
Ghana	John Mahama	President	
Grenada	Tillman Thomas	Prime Minister	
Guyana	Carolyn Rodrigues	Foreign Minister	
India	Mohammad Hamid Ansari	Vice-President	
Kenya	Mwai Kibaki	President	
Kiribati	Taomati Iuta	Acting Foreign Minister	
Lesotho	Pakalitha Mosisili	Prime Minister	
Malawi	Bingu wa Mutharika	President	
Malaysia	Najib Razak	Prime Minister	
Maldives	Mohamed Nasheed	President	
Malta	Tonio Borg	Deputy Prime Minister	
Mauritius	Navin Ramgoolam	Prime Minister	
Mozambique	Armando Guebuza	President	
Namibia	Hifikepunye Pohamba	President	
Nauru	Marcus Stephen	President	
New Zealand	Murray McCully	Foreign Minister	
Nigeria	Goodluck Jonathan	President	
Pakistan	Yousaf Raza Gillani	Prime Minister	
Papua New Guinea	Peter O'Neill	Prime Minister	
Rwanda	Paul Kagame	President	
Saint Kitts and Nevis	Denzil Douglas	Prime Minister	
Saint Lucia	June Soomer	Special Envoy	
Saint Vincent and the Grenadines	Cenio Lewis	High Commissioner to the United Kingdom	
Samoa	Tuilaepa Aiono Sailele Malielegaoi	Prime Minister	
Seychelles	James Michel	President	
Sierra Leone	Ernest Bai Koroma	President	
Singapore	Lee Hsien Loong	Prime Minister	
Solomon Islands	Peter Shannel Agovaka	Foreign Minister	
South Africa	Jacob Zuma	President	
Sri Lanka	Mahinda Rajapaksa	President	
Swaziland	Barnabas Sibusiso Dlamini	Prime Minister	
Tanzania	Jakaya Kikwete	President	
Tonga	Sialeʻataongo Tuʻivakanō	Prime Minister	
Trinidad and Tobago	Kamla Persad-Bissessar	Prime Minister	
Tuvalu	Willy Telavi	Prime Minister	
Uganda	Edward Ssekandi	Vice-President	
United Kingdom	David Cameron	Prime Minister	
Vanuatu	Sato Kilman	Prime Minister	
Zambia	Guy Scott	Vice-President	
