= Royal Succession Act 2013 =

Act of Parliament in New Zealand

Parliament of New Zealand
- Enacted by: Parliament of New Zealand
- Royal assent: 17 December 2013
- Commenced: 26 March 2015

Legislative history
- Bill title: Bill 99-1
- Introduced by: Judith Collins, Minister of Justice
- Introduced: 18 February 2013

Amends
- Act of Settlement 1701

Related legislation
- Succession to the Crown Act 2013 (United Kingdom); Succession to the Throne Act, 2013 (Canada); Succession to the Crown Act 2015 (Australia)

Keywords
- Perth Agreement
- Status: In force

The Royal Succession Act is an act of the New Zealand Parliament to alter the laws of succession to the New Zealand throne.

Compared to the Canadian Succession to the Throne Act, 2013, which merely assented to the British Succession to the Crown Act 2013, this legislation effectively re-legislated the effects of the British act.

== Background ==
On 28 October 2011, at the Commonwealth Heads of Government Meeting held in Perth, Western Australia, the heads of government of the 16 Commonwealth realms, which shared Elizabeth II as head of state, announced that they would introduce legislation in all 16 countries to end the primacy of males over females and the disqualification of persons married to Catholic spouses in the succession to the Crown. In a letter to the other realms' heads of government, prior to the Perth Agreement, British Prime Minister David Cameron additionally proposed to limit the requirement to obtain the monarch's permission to marry to the first six people in line to the throne.

== Debate ==
Monarchy New Zealand welcomed the Bill, stating "The much-needed changes to the royal succession will remove gender discrimination by allowing women equal right to the throne."

The Republican Movement of Aotearoa New Zealand described the changes as "too little, too late" and was critical of the continuation of the rule preventing Catholics being monarch.

== Clauses ==
The bill's provisions are to implement in New Zealand law changes to the succession agreed to at the 2011 Commonwealth Heads of Government Meeting. Specifically it:

- provides for the succession of the Crown to be determined without regard to the sex of those born after 29 October 2011
- abolishes the exclusion from the throne of those who marry Roman Catholics
- repeals the Royal Marriages Act and substitutes a requirement that the first six individuals in line to the throne obtain the consent of the Sovereign to marry
- validates certain marriages that occurred in violation of the Royal Marriages Act.

To implement those provisions, the bill provides for amending the Bill of Rights 1689, the Act of Settlement 1701 and the Imperial Laws Application Act 1988 in so far as they apply in New Zealand.

== Bill stages ==
The Bill was introduced into Parliament on 18 February 2013, by Minister of Justice Judith Collins, and it passed its first reading on 2 July 2013, with 104 votes in favour and 15 abstentions. It was then referred to the Justice and Electoral Committee, which reported on 31 October 2013. Its second and third readings were on 10 December 2013. Royal assent was given on 17 December. The Act was brought into force on 26 March 2015, in concert with Her Majesty's other realms.
