= Succession to the Crown Act 2015 =

Act of the Parliament of Australia, currently registered as C2015A00023

Parliament of Australia
- Long title: An Act to change the law relating to royal succession and royal marriages, and for related purposes
- Citation: No. 23 of 2015
- Territorial extent: States and territories of Australia
- Enacted by: Australian House of Representatives
- Enacted: 17 March 2015
- Enacted by: Australian Senate
- Enacted: 19 March 2015
- Royal assent: 24 March 2015
- Commenced: 26 March 2015

Legislative history

Initiating chamber: Australian House of Representatives
- Bill title: Succession to the Crown Bill 2015
- Introduced by: Christian Porter
- First reading: 5 March 2015
- Second reading: 17 March 2015
- Third reading: 17 March 2015

Revising chamber: Australian Senate
- Bill title: Succession to the Crown Bill 2015
- Member(s) in charge: Michaelia Cash
- First reading: 18 March 2015
- Second reading: 19 March 2015
- Third reading: 19 March 2015

Amends
- Act of Settlement 1701

Related legislation
- Statute of Westminster Adoption Act 1942; Australia Act 1986
- Status: Current legislation

The Succession to the Crown Act 2015 (Cth) is an Act of the Parliament of the Commonwealth of Australia, which was enacted at the request of all six Australian states as required by the Australian Constitution. This Australian act, and corresponding acts by the State parliaments, were the final part of the Perth Agreement's legislative program agreed by the prime ministers of the Commonwealth realms to modernise the succession to the crowns of the sixteen Commonwealth realms, while continuing to have in common the same monarch and royal line of succession, as was the case at the time of the Statute of Westminster 1931.

As the Statute of Westminster ended the ability of the Parliament of the United Kingdom to legislate on behalf of the Commonwealth of Australia, and the Australia Acts eliminated the remaining possibilities for the UK to legislate with effect to the Australian states, Australia had the most challenging legal environment of the Commonwealth realms, as each of the six state governments and the federal government has a separate direct relationship with the monarch.

It was brought into effect simultaneously with the similar laws enacted by the other Commonwealth realms after the Governor-General proclaimed the law to commence at "the beginning of 26 March 2015 by United Kingdom time".

== Background ==
Prior to the Act, the succession to the throne of Australia, like all Commonwealth realms, was controlled by a system of male-preference primogeniture, under which succession passed first to the monarch's or nearest dynast's legitimate sons (and to their legitimate issue) in order of birth, and subsequently to their daughters and their legitimate issue, again in order of birth, so that sons always inherit before their sisters, elder children inherit before younger, and descendants inherit before collateral relatives.

Succession is governed by the Acts of Union 1707, which restates the provisions of the Act of Settlement 1701, and the Bill of Rights 1689. These laws originally restricted the succession to legitimate descendants of Sophia, Electress of Hanover (the mother of George I), and bar those who are Roman Catholics or who have married Roman Catholics. The descendants of those who are debarred for being or marrying Roman Catholics, however, may still be eligible to succeed. By convention iterated in the preamble to the Statute of Westminster 1931, the line of succession cannot be altered in any realm without the assent of the parliaments of the other 15 realms, leading to the adoption of the Perth Agreement at the 22nd Commonwealth Heads of Government Meeting in October 2011.

=== State legislation ===
The Council of Australian Governments agreed that the best way to meet Australia's obligations under the Perth Agreement was to use section 51(xxxviii) of the Constitution of Australia to allow the Commonwealth Parliament to alter the Treason Act 1351, Bill of Rights 1689, Act of Settlement 1701, Acts of Union 1707, Acts of Union 1800, and to repeal the Royal Marriages Act 1772, in as far as they are a part of the law of the Commonwealth of Australia, the Australian states, and Territories of Australia.

The States were careful to include provision that the complex interrelationship between the Sovereign, the Commonwealth and the states was not affected by the Act, as unlike the Canadian provinces, Australian states have relationships with the Crown which are independent of the Commonwealth. For example, a Canadian lieutenant governor is appointed by the Governor General of Canada on the advice of the prime minister and subject to their authority, whereas the governors of the Australian states are appointed by the Sovereign on the direct advice of the premier of the state in question, and are not subject to the authority of the Governor-General.

By convention, the State Governors are issued a dormant commission to assume the position of Administrator of the Commonwealth should the Governor-General die, resign or be absent from Australia when they are appointed Governor. This commission can be revoked by the King on the advice of the Commonwealth Prime Minister, as occurred when Sir Colin Hannah, Governor of Queensland, had his dormant commission revoked for making partisan political comments shortly before the 1975 constitutional crisis.

State	Name of Requesting Act	Royal Assent granted
Queensland	Succession to the Crown Act 2013 (QLD)	14 May 2013
New South Wales	Succession to the Crown (Request) Act 2013 (NSW)	1 July 2013
Tasmania	Succession to the Crown (Request) Act 2013 (TAS)	12 September 2013
Victoria	Succession to the Crown (Request) Act 2013 (VIC)	22 October 2013
South Australia	Succession to the Crown (Request) Act 2014 (SA)	26 June 2014
Western Australia	Succession to the Crown Act 2015 (WA)	3 March 2015

The Parliament of the Northern Territory also passed its own legislation, the Succession to the Crown (Request) (National Uniform Legislation) Act 2013 (NT) however, this was not constitutionally required, as the Commonwealth Parliament retains the right to legislate for the Northern Territory. The Northern Territory legislation received royal assent from the Administrator on 8 November 2013.

Unlike the states, the relationship between Australia's self-governing territories and the sovereign is mediated by the Federal Government, similar to the situation in Canada.

== The Act ==
=== Gender ===
Males born after 28 October 2011 no longer precede their elder sisters in the line of succession. The first in the line of succession to be affected by this on the date the changes came into effect were the children of Lady Davina Lewis, her son Tāne (born 2012) and her daughter Senna (born 2010), who were reversed in the order of succession, becoming 29th and 28th in line respectively.

=== Marriage to Roman Catholics ===
Marrying a Roman Catholic no longer disqualifies a person from succeeding to the Crown. The explanation published when the bill was introduced mentioned that those who had lost their places in the line of succession by marrying a Roman Catholic would regain their places, but that those "with a realistic prospect of succeeding to the Throne" would not be affected. The first in the line of succession to be affected by this change on the date the changes came into effect was George Windsor, Earl of St Andrews, who had married a Catholic in 1988, and was restored to the line of succession in 34th place, after the Duke of Kent. The provision of the Act of Settlement requiring the monarch to be a Protestant continues.

=== Sovereign's consent to royal marriages ===
The Royal Marriages Act 1772 was repealed. This law required the consent of the Sovereign for any descendant of King George II to marry; hundreds of years after the death of George II, the number of people to whom the act applied was quite large, and almost none of them had any realistic chance of succeeding to the Crown.

For example, the male-line descendants of Ernest Augustus, King of Hanover, the fifth son of King George III, lost their crown in 1866 and their British titles in 1919, but are male-line descendants of George II. As such, they continued to be required to seek permission for their marriages from the British monarch, so that their marriages would be legal in the United Kingdom, where the family had a large amount of property.

Since the Succession to the Crown Act came into force, only the first six persons in line to the throne require the sovereign's approval to marry. Marriage without the sovereign's consent would disqualify the person and the person's descendants from the marriage from succeeding to the Crown. However, the marriage would still be legally valid.

Marriages legally void under the Royal Marriages Act 1772 will be treated as never having been void, except for purposes relating to the succession to the Crown, provided all the following conditions are met:

1. Neither party to the marriage was one of the six persons next in the line of succession to the Crown at the time of the marriage.
2. No consent was sought under section 1 of that Act, or notice given under section 2 of that act, in respect of the marriage.
3. In all the circumstances it was reasonable for the person concerned not to have been aware at the time of the marriage that the Act applied to it.
4. No person acted before the coming into force of the 2015 Act on the basis that the marriage was void.

=== Consequential amendments ===
Other changes to Australia's law were making "subject to provisions of" the Australian act the provisions that involve the Crown in the Acts of Union 1707, between England and Scotland, and in the Acts of Union 1800, between Great Britain and Ireland. Also, several sections in the Bill of Rights 1689 and the Act of Settlement 1701 involving marriages with "papists" (Catholics) were repealed, and any references to provisions relating to "the succession to, or possession of, the Crown" were made to include, by reference, the provisions of the Australian act.

However, the sections that ban Catholic succession were not repealed. Catholics are still officially termed as being "naturally dead and deemed to be dead" in terms of succession. This discrimination was first legislated in the Bill of Rights 1689.

As the monarch's eldest son will no longer automatically be heir apparent, the Treason Act 1351 was also amended, so that encompassing the death of the monarch's eldest son and heir is now extended to murdering the heir of whatever gender. Another amendment to the Treason Act is that, whereas it had been treason to "violate" the monarch's eldest son's wife, it is now only treason if the eldest son is also the heir to the throne.

== See also ==
- Canada: Succession to the Throne Act, 2013
- New Zealand: Royal Succession Act 2013
- United Kingdom: Succession to the Crown Act 2013
