= University of Western Ontario Faculty of Law =

Law school in London, Ontario, Canada

- Motto: Veritas et utilitas (Latin)
- Motto in English: "Truth and usefulness"
- Type: Public law school
- Established: 1959; 67 years ago
- Affiliations: University of Western Ontario
- Dean: Mohamed F. Khimji
- Students: 534
- Location: London, Ontario, Canada; 43°00′23″N 81°16′34″W
- Website: law.uwo.ca

The University of Western Ontario Faculty of Law, branded as Western Law since 2011, is the law school of Western University in London, Ontario, Canada. Founded in 1959, its first dean was former Supreme Court of Canada justice, the Honourable Ivan Rand, who saw the school as developing "in the minds of its students the habit of thinking in terms of the dynamic tradition, in the broadest sense, of our law." The current dean of Law is Mohamed F. Khimji, who began his tenure in July 2025.

== Facilities ==
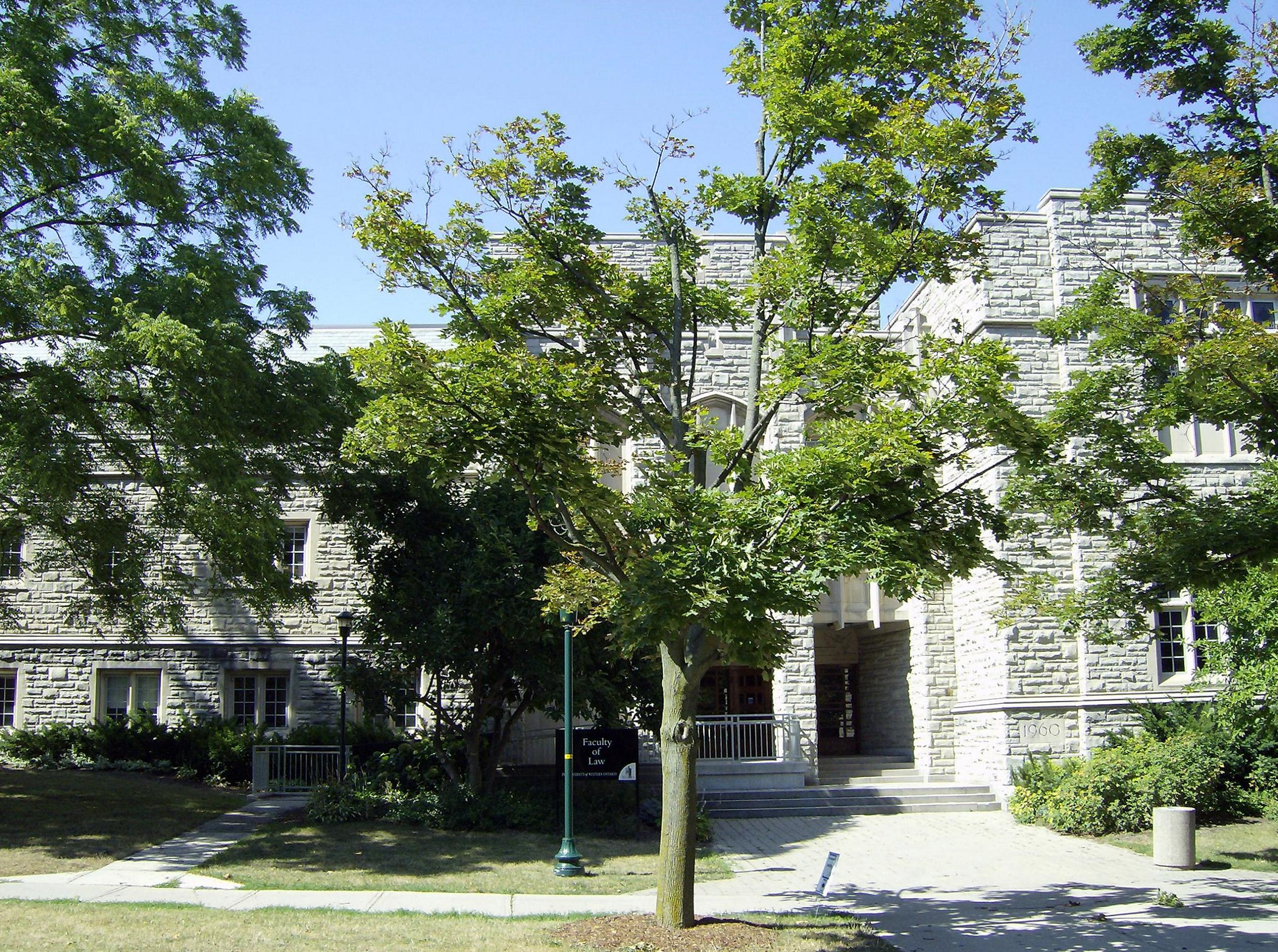
Exterior of Western Law School

The law school is situated in the southwest portion of Western's main campus and is housed in the Josephine Spencer Niblett building. While the school finds itself in the middle of the university's large campus, the law school is completely self-contained, offering students two lounges, a café, moot court room and library. The John and Dotsa Bitove Family Law Library, located on the second floor of the law school, is the central information resource for students and faculty members of the faculty. The collection currently includes approximately 193,000 volumes and 45,000 microforms. Primary materials include a comprehensive collection of Canadian legislation and law reports, the principal British and American legal sources, and a growing collection of European and other international materials. The library also has an excellent collection of legal treatises and periodical literature.

== Admissions and academics ==
University rankings

World rankings

Canadian rankings

For the 2022 academic year, there were 2,549 applicants for the 189 first-year spaces. The mean/median cumulative average for successful applicants was 3.8 and the mean/median LSAT score was 164.

The school also has exchange programs with law schools around the world. Upper year students have the opportunity to study abroad for one semester for credit to their Western J.D.

Glass panes in the Moot Court Room

The faculty offers two masters-level degrees: the Master of Laws (LL.M.) and the Master of Studies in Law (M.S.L.). The Ph.D. program began in September 2013.

Western Law, in conjunction with other faculties on campus also offers joint degree programs, including combined business and law degrees, combined law and engineering degrees and combined law and Ph.D. degrees.

The 2009–10 academic year marked Western Law's 50th anniversary.

== Centres and clinics ==
The law school houses a number of student-staffed legal centres and clinics, which provide services to different segments of the community, while providing law students with practical legal experience.

=== Pro Bono Students Canada ===
Pro Bono Students Canada is a national program that started a branch at the University of Western Ontario, Faculty of Law in the 1998–99 academic year. The function of the program is to match law student volunteers with community agencies with a need for legal services but with insufficient resources to compensate legal counsel. Agencies typically involved in Pro Bono Students Canada include public interest and non-profit organizations, tribunals, legal clinics and lawyers working pro bono on a particular case. Law student volunteers complete legal research or other law-related projects for member organizations over the course of the academic year under the supervision of a lawyer mentor. The Western program is one of the largest national chapters.

=== Community Legal Services ===
Community Legal Services (CLS) provides free legal advice and representation to members of the community, and to Fanshawe College and Western students. CLS is funded by Legal Aid Ontario, Fanshawe Student's Council, the University Students Council, and the Faculty of Law.

Over 100 students work at CLS over the course of the academic year under the supervision of three experienced lawyers. Students carry their own files, and gain valuable experience in client correspondence, legal research and drafting of pleadings. Students also have the opportunity to appear at court on behalf of CLS' clients, arguing motions, appearing in criminal court and conducting Small Claims Court trials. Further, students that take upper-year advanced litigation practice courses, also work at CLS for academic credit. John Eberhard Q.C. was a third-year law student when he persuaded the dean and faculty members to allow him to create and coordinate Western's (UWO) first “Student Defenders System”, the precursor of CLS.

=== Dispute Resolution Centre ===
The Dispute Resolution Centre (DRC) is a not-for-profit organization that provides mediation services to residents of London and Middlesex County who wish to resolve their disputes quickly, efficiently and inexpensively.

Operated by Western Law students under the supervision the Faculty at the University of Western Ontario, the DRC can help develop solutions to conflict in an organized and informal way. The DRC mediates disputes in varied types of conflicts, such as landlord/tenant, consumer/merchant, interpersonal/relationship, private contract and separation disputes.

=== Sport Solution ===
The Sport Solution is a joint project of Athletes CAN and the Dispute Resolution Centre at Western Law. The program is nationally available and provides assistance in resolving sport-related problems and offers support throughout the dispute resolution process.

=== Business Law Clinic ===
The Western Business Law Clinic provides small or start-up businesses with legal representation on transaction matters including business structure, finance, intellectual property protection, product liability, employment law, government regulations, contracts, taxation, guarantees and personal liability and environmental issues.

=== Western Intellectual Property & Innovation Legal Clinic (WIPILC) ===
Students at this clinic have client-facing opportunities and are exposed to a wide range of intellectual property related legal matters. WIPILC provides pro-bono legal information to start-ups, entrepreneurs, small businesses, artists, authors, researchers and inventors.

== Publications ==
The school publishes two law journals: the faculty-edited Canadian Journal of Law and Jurisprudence, published by Cambridge University Press; and the student-edited University of Western Ontario Law Journal. The school also has a student newspaper, Amicus Curiae.

== Student life ==
Hockey game between the students of the Law and Medical faculties at UWO in support of Camp Trillium for child cancer care in March 2010

The law school is home to many student-run clubs, including a student newspaper called Amicus Curiae and various interest-based clubs. Governed by the Student Legal Society (SLS), clubs are separated into either Class A Organizations or Class B Organizations.

Approximately every other Wednesday during the academic year, the SLS organizes social outings for law students at large bars or night clubs. Known as "Dennings", they are named after Alfred Denning, the judge from England's Court of Appeal. A few hours before each Denning, the Mature Students Club hosts "Puisne Dennings" at a nearby pub geared towards more conversation and discourse.

The law building houses a student lounge in the basement level. A cafe operates in the part of the law building known as "Chambers". Law students also have access to all the amenities of the larger university campus.

Western Law students participate in many intramural sports, competing with other faculty and residence based teams on campus. Students also participate in the yearly "Law Games" against teams from other law schools across Canada. Western organized the 2007 edition of these games.

== Notable faculty ==
- Erika Chamberlain
- Randal Graham
- Michael Lynk (born 1952)
- Richard McLaren (born 1945)

== Notable alumni ==
- Joseph Arvay (1949–2020), lawyer
- David Shoemaker, CEO of the Canadian Olympic Committee
- Laurel Broten (born ca. 1967), former politician
- Adam Chambers, politician
- Jeff Dennis (born 1958), entrepreneur
- David Doherty, retired justice of the Ontario Court of Appeal
- Christine Elliott (born 1955), lawyer and former politician
- Murray Elston (born 1949), former politician
- John Fitzgerald (born 1968), lawyer and former soccer player
- Eddie Francis (born 1974), businessperson and former politician
- Michael Geist, academic
- Dianne Haskett (born 1955), politician
- Roberta Jamieson, lawyer and First Nations activist
- Ian Kerr (1965–2019), academic
- Richard Marceau (born 1970), former politician
- John Matheson (1917–2013), politician and judge
- Peter Partington (born 1939), former politician
- Steve Peers, academic
- Jim Peterson (1941–2024), politician
- Reva Seth, lawyer and journalist
- Filomena Tassi, politician
- Bob Wood (born 1949), former politician
- Stephen Woodworth (born 1954), politician

== See also ==
- List of law schools in Canada
