= Patrick Monahan (disambiguation) =

Pat Monahan (born 1969) is an American singer and lead singer of Train.

Patrick Monahan may also refer to:

- Patrick Monahan (comedian) (born 1976), Irish-Iranian comedian
- Patrick J. Monahan (born 1954), Canadian academic

== See also ==
- P. H. Moynihan (Patrick Henry Moynihan, 1869–1946), U.S. Representative from Illinois
- Daniel Patrick Moynihan (1927–2003), known as Pat, U.S. Senator from New York
- Patricia Monaghan (1946–2012), American poet
- Pat Monaghan, British ornithologist
