= Fasken =

International law firm

Fasken Martineau DuMoulin LLP
- No. of offices: 9 (Vancouver, Surrey, Calgary, Toronto, Ottawa, Montreal, Quebec City, London, Johannesburg)
- No. of lawyers: 925
- Major practice areas: General practice
- Key people: Peter Feldberg (Managing Partner)
- Date founded: 1999–2000 (merger)
- Company type: Limited liability partnership
- Website: www.fasken.com

Fasken Martineau DuMoulin LLP (doing business as Fasken) is an international business law firm with approximately 925 lawyers and offices in Vancouver, Surrey, Calgary, Toronto, Ottawa, Montreal, Quebec City, London and Johannesburg. The firm traces its origins to a predecessor firm that was originally founded in 1863. On 29 November 2017, the firm announced that it was changing its brand name from Fasken Martineau to Fasken.

== History ==
Fasken is the result of a merger between three predecessor firms – Fasken Campbell Godfrey, Martineau Walker, and Russell & DuMoulin. Fasken Campbell Godfrey in Toronto was formed from the 1989 merger of two long-standing Toronto firms, Fasken & Calvin (which began as Beatty and Chadwick, founded in 1863 by William Henry Beatty and Edward Marion Chadwick) and Campbell Godfrey & Lewtas (which began as Howland & Arnoldi in the 1880s). Martineau Walker in Montreal dates from 1907, while Russell & DuMoulin in Vancouver dates from 1882.

In late 1999, Toronto-based Fasken Campbell Godfrey and Quebec-based Martineau Walker (of Montreal and Quebec City) joined together, forming Fasken Martineau. In February 2000, Vancouver-based Russell & DuMoulin joined the group to create Fasken Martineau DuMoulin LLP.

== Notable members and alumni ==
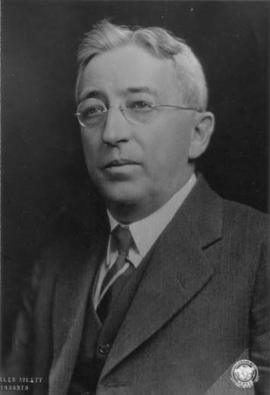
Alexander Fasken, c. 1935

- Joel Lightbound, Canadian member of Parliament
- Mark Andrews, University boat race winner
- Jeff Dennis, Toronto entrepreneur
- Guy Giorno, former political operative
- Claude R. Thomson
