= Succession to the Crown Act 2013 =

British act of Parliament

Succession to the Crown Act 2013 (Note: Section 5(4).)
- Act of Parliament
- Parliament of the United Kingdom
- Long title: An Act to make succession to the Crown not depend on gender; to make provision about Royal Marriages; and for connected purposes.
- Citation: 2013 c. 20
- Introduced by: Nick Clegg, Deputy Prime Minister of the United Kingdom (Commons); Lord Wallace, Advocate General for Scotland (Lords)

Dates
- Royal assent: 25 April 2013
- Commencement: 25 April 2013 (section 5); 26 March 2015 (rest of act); (Note: Section 5(1)–(3). The Succession to the Crown Act 2013 (Commencement) Order 2015 (SI 2015/894).)
Other legislation
Amends	Treason Act 1351; Bill of Rights 1689; Act of Settlement 1701; Regency Act 1937
Repeals/revokes	Royal Marriages Act 1772

Status: Current legislation

History of passage through Parliament

Text of statute as originally enacted

Revised text of statute as amended

The Succession to the Crown Act 2013 (c. 20) is an act of the Parliament of the United Kingdom that altered the laws of succession to the British throne in accordance with the 2011 Perth Agreement. The act replaced male-preference primogeniture with absolute primogeniture for those in the line of succession born after 28 October 2011, which means the eldest child, regardless of gender, precedes any siblings. The act also repealed the Royal Marriages Act 1772 (12 Geo. 3. c. 11), ending disqualification of a person who married a Roman Catholic from succession, and removed the requirement for those outside the first six persons in line to the throne to seek the Sovereign's approval to marry. It came into force on 26 March 2015, at the same time as the other Commonwealth realms implemented the Perth Agreement in their own laws.

== Background ==
Under the Act of Settlement 1701 (12 & 13 Will. 3. c. 2), the throne of the Kingdom of England was settled on the Electress Sophia of Hanover and the "heirs of her body", this phrase being understood under English common law to imply male-preference primogeniture, meaning that brothers would precede sisters in the line of succession irrespective of order of birth. This Act also prevented a "papist" (Roman Catholic) from inheriting the English throne and removed those who had married Roman Catholics from the line of succession.

The treaties that created the Kingdom of Great Britain in 1707 and the United Kingdom of Great Britain and Ireland in 1801 specifically applied these provisions to the new British throne. Article II of the Acts of Union 1707 stated that the "Succession of the Monarchy" is settled by the Act of Settlement 1701 and that the ban of "Papists" from inheriting the throne was to continue according to that Act. Article 2 of Acts of Union 1801 again maintained that the succession rules in place in the new United Kingdom of Great Britain and Ireland should be "continued limited and settled in the same manner".

Since the acts of Union 1707, male preference primogeniture has operated twice to displace a female by a younger brother: when Princess Augusta's younger brother became King George III on the death of their grandfather King George II (1760); and when Princess Victoria's younger brother became King Edward VII on the death of their mother Queen Victoria (1901).

Princess Anne is the younger sister of King Charles III. Her place in the line of succession is not affected by the provisions of the act relating to male preference in that she remains head of the line following those headed by her younger brothers. Their lines continue to precede hers under male preference because all four siblings were born before 28 October 2011.

=== Agreement in principle (2011) and final consent (2012) ===
In December 2011 the Statement of Friday 28 October 2011 issued at Perth, Australia was published in a House of Commons committee report. It stated that the prime ministers of the sixteen Commonwealth nations "of whom Her Majesty the Queen is Head of State" had "agreed in principle to work together towards a common approach to amending the rules on the succession to their respective Crowns", and that they would wish "unanimously to advise The Queen of their views and seek her agreement." The statement continued:

All countries wish to see change in two areas. First, they wish to end the system of male preference primogeniture under which a younger son can displace an elder daughter in the line of succession. Second, they wish to remove the legal provision that anyone who marries a Roman Catholic shall be ineligible to succeed to the Crown. There are no other restrictions in the rules about the religion of the spouse of a person in the line of succession and the Prime Ministers felt that this unique barrier could no longer be justified. The Prime Ministers have agreed that they will each work within their respective administrations to bring forward the necessary measures to enable all the realms to give effect to these changes simultaneously.

In a letter to the other realms' heads of government, prior to the Perth Agreement, British Prime Minister David Cameron had additionally proposed to limit the requirement to obtain the monarch's permission to marry to the first six people in line to the throne.

On 4 December 2012, Deputy Prime Minister Nick Clegg announced:

[T]he Government has received final consent from all the Commonwealth realms to press ahead with a landmark bill to end the centuries-old discrimination against women in line to the British throne at the soonest possible opportunity. This confirmation means that the Government will seek to introduce the Succession to the Crown Bill in the House of Commons at the earliest opportunity allowed by the parliamentary timetable.

=== Progress in Parliament ===
The bill was published on 13 December 2012, and after passing both Houses of Parliament it received royal assent on 25 April 2013, immediately before the prorogation of Parliament that day.

The purpose of the Succession to the Crown Act is to give effect in the United Kingdom to the Perth agreement. The British government announced that the act's provisions were not intended to come into force before the appropriate domestic arrangements were in place in the other Commonwealth realms.

== Provisions ==
=== Gender ===
Males born after 28 October 2011 no longer precede their elder sisters in the line of succession. There has not yet been a monarch's succession affected by the new rule. The first people in the line of succession to be affected by the changes on the date they came into force were the children of Lady Davina Lewis, her son Tāne (born 2012) and her daughter Senna (born 2010), who were reversed in the order of succession, becoming 29th and 28th in line respectively. The current first affected successor in line is Princess Charlotte of Wales, who would otherwise be preceded by Prince Louis of Wales.

Princess Anne, however, would succeed after her younger brothers because she was born before the commencement of the Succession Act. As a result, her brothers, their children and grandchildren precede her in the line of succession.

When the act came into force in May 2013, the Duchess of Cambridge was expecting her first child, and its provisions would have had significant effect had the child been a girl, with media commentary focusing on the potential for the birth to make history. In the event it was a boy (as it was, Prince George of Wales) the act would have no practical effect. However, it has since taken on significance for his younger siblings. Princess Charlotte of Wales was from her birth on 2 May 2015 fourth in line to the throne, after Prince George and ahead of Prince Harry, just as she would have been had the act not been passed. However, due to the provisions of the act, she has retained her place in the succession ahead of her younger brother Prince Louis of Wales, who was born on 23 April 2018.

=== Marriage to Roman Catholics ===
Marrying a Roman Catholic no longer disqualifies a person from succeeding to the Crown. The explanation published when the bill was introduced mentioned that those who had lost their places in the line of succession by marrying a Roman Catholic would regain their places, but that no one "with a realistic prospect of succeeding to the Throne" would be affected. The highest-ranked person to be affected by this change was George Windsor, Earl of St Andrews, who had married a Roman Catholic in 1988 and was restored to the line of succession in 34th place, after his father Prince Edward, Duke of Kent. The provision of the Act of Settlement prohibiting the monarch themself being a Roman Catholic continues.

=== Consent to marriages ===
The Royal Marriages Act 1772 is repealed. Instead, only the first six persons in line to the throne require the Sovereign's approval to marry. For these six, marriage without the Sovereign's consent would disqualify the person and the person's descendants from succeeding to the Crown. However, the marriage would still be legally valid.

Marriages legally void under the Royal Marriages Act 1772 will be treated as never having been void, except for purposes relating to the succession to the Crown, provided all the following conditions are met:

1. Neither party to the marriage was one of the six persons next in the line of succession to the Crown at the time of the marriage.
2. No consent was sought under section 1 of that Act, or notice given under section 2 of that Act, (Note: That is, this section does not apply to marriages for which prior consent was asked but not given.) in respect of the marriage.
3. In all the circumstances it was reasonable for the person concerned not to have been aware at the time of the marriage that the act applied to it.
4. No person acted before the coming into force of the 2013 Act on the basis that the marriage was void. (Note: That is, the section does not re-establish a marriage as valid if somebody already litigated on the grounds that the marriage was void.)

=== Consequential amendments ===
Provisions in the Acts of Union 1707, between England and Scotland, and in the Acts of Union 1800, between Great Britain and Ireland, that involve the Crown are "subject to provisions of" the act. Several sections in the Bill of Rights 1689 (Note: "And whereas it hath [been] found by Experience that it is inconsistent with the Safety ... of this ... [Kingdom] to be governed by a Popish Prince or by any King or Queene marrying a Papist ..." (emphasis added)) (Note: "That all and every person and persons that is ... or shall profess the popish religion, or shall marry a Papist, shall be excluded and be for ever [uncapable] to inherit ... the Crowne ... of this Realme ... and the said Crowne ... shall ... descend to ... Protestants as should have inherited ... the same in case the said person or persons soe reconciled ... or Marrying as aforesaid ... were naturally dead" (emphasis added)) and the Act of Settlement 1701 (Note: "[E]very Person ... should professe the Popish Religion or marry a Papist should be excluded ... to inherit ... the Crown ... of this Realm" (emphasis added)) (Note: [I]n case the said Person or Persons ... or marrying as aforesaid were naturally dead." (emphasis added)) (Note: "That all and every Person and Persons who shall or may take or inherit the said Crown ... and is are ... or shall profess the Popish Religion or shall marry a Papist shall be subject to such Incapacities" (emphasis added)) involving marriages with "papists" (Catholics) were repealed. Any references to provisions relating to "the succession to, or possession of, the Crown" also include, by reference, the provisions of this act.

However, the sections that ban Catholic succession were not repealed. Catholics are still officially termed as being "naturally dead and deemed to be dead" in terms of succession. This distinction was first legislated in the Bill of Rights 1689. Jacob Rees-Mogg (Con) also confirmed "the act of Settlement deems somebody who has been a Catholic for a minute to be 'dead' in terms of the succession, and it passes over them 'as if they were dead'. It is an absolute. If at any moment in their whole life they were in communion with Rome, they are excluded from the throne, deemed to be dead." Mark Durkan (SDLP) made a comparison of this with McCarthyism, "In effect, it is the McCarthyite question: 'Are you now or have you ever been a Catholic?'". He then went on with a summary of the proviso saying, "For anybody who has ever been a Catholic in any shape or form, that is it, they are out; they count as dead for these purposes." The ban continues. A person who has never been a Catholic but who is not Protestant is permitted to succeed if they convert to a Protestant communion, since a Protestant monarch is required by the Acts of Union 1707.

As the monarch's eldest son will no longer automatically be heir apparent, the Treason Act 1351 was also amended, so that encompassing the death of the monarch's eldest son is now extended to murdering the heir apparent, whatever the sex. Another amendment to the Treason Act is that, whereas it had been treason to "violate" the monarch's eldest son's wife, it is now only treason if the eldest son is also the eldest child.

The Regency Act 1937 (1 Edw. 8 & 1 Geo. 6. c. 16) was amended to require the regent to be a person who had not been disqualified from the succession by marrying without the monarch's permission under the 2013 act.

=== Commencement ===
None of the provisions of the act altering the law, including those which will or may affect any direct or collateral line of succession to the British throne, were to come into force until a day appointed for it by a commencement order made by the Lord President of the Council. (Note: Section 5 only involves commencement and the short title and does not include any clause about succession. The person who will actually succeed will continue to be the person who at the time of the next demise of the Crown is the heir apparent or presumptive, and the act does not alter the Accession Council's responsibility to meet for the purposes of the act of Settlement and Acts of Union and to direct a proclamation of accession to be read in public places, as in the case of the proclamation of accession of Elizabeth II.) When publishing the bill the government had announced that it was expecting to bring the provisions into force at the same time as the other realms would be bringing into force any changes to their legislation or other changes necessary for them to implement the Perth Agreement. This was done on 26 March 2015.

== External reference ==
The legislation passed in the realms of Australia, Barbados, and Canada make reference to the United Kingdom legislation in different ways. The Succession to the Crown Act 2015, passed by the parliament of the Commonwealth of Australia, is expressed to be for changing "the law relating to the effect of gender and marriage on royal succession, consistently with changes made to that law in the United Kingdom, so that the Sovereign of Australia is the same person as the Sovereign of the United Kingdom". The Succession to the Throne Act, 2013, passed by the parliament of Canada, refers to the bill (not the act): "The alteration in the law touching the Succession to the Throne set out in the bill laid before the Parliament of the United Kingdom and entitled A Bill to Make succession to the Crown not depend on gender; to make provision about Royal Marriages; and for connected purposes is assented to." The parliament of Barbados' Succession to the Throne Act, 2013, uses similar wording to Canada's law: "The Parliament of Barbados acquiesces to the alteration in the law relating to the Succession to the Throne set out in the Bill laid before the Parliament of the United Kingdom and entitled A Bill to make succession to the Crown not depend on gender; to make provision about Royal Marriages; and for connected purposes."

== Commentary ==
=== Church of England ===
On 21 January 2013, the Church of England published a briefing endorsing the bill's provisions and stating, "The use of fast-tracking procedures [for the bill] is acceptable." The same day, the Telegraph reported that the Church of England had written to MPs to express its official backing for the proposed changes.

=== House of Commons ===
A report on the rules of royal succession was prepared by the Political and Constitutional Reform Select Committee of the House of Commons, chaired by Graham Allen, and was published in December 2011. The report welcomed the proposals, but drew attention to "connected issues that may be raised when the proposals are debated, depending on the scope of the bill, especially the future role of the Crown in the Church of England, and the continued ineligibility of women to succeed to the majority of hereditary peerages, which remains a matter of public interest for as long as it has an impact on gender balance in the House of Lords".

On 9 September 2012, the British government published a response to the report, reiterating that it intended to implement the Perth Agreement but had no plans to change the laws of succession to peerages or the established status of the Church of England.

=== House of Lords ===
On 21 January 2013, the House of Lords Constitution Committee published a report opposing the Government's plan to fast-track the bill, citing the legislation's "constitutional significance" and "possible unintended consequences".

In response, the Government expanded the time allocated for the bill's debate in the House of Commons from one day to two days, and it decided not to fast-track the bill in the House of Lords, where the normal time limits were observed.

== Bill stages ==
The first reading (introduction) of the bill in the House of Commons took place on 13 December 2012. Passage of an Allocation of Time motion, the second reading, and the committee stage (in the form of a Committee of the Whole House) took place on 22 January 2013. The report stage and third reading (passage) took place on 28 January 2013. The only amendment made in the House of Commons was to insert the words "from the marriage" after the word "descendants" in section 3(3), which was passed without debate.

The first reading of the bill in the House of Lords took place on 29 January 2013. The bill passed second reading on 14 February 2013 and was reviewed by committee on 28 February 2013. The report stage was on 13 March 2013. The bill was passed at the third reading on 22 April. No amendments were made to the bill in the House of Lords, and it received Royal Assent on 25 April 2013.

== Consents for marriages under the act ==
Consents for marriages under the act appear in the Privy Council Orders. The first person in the line of succession to receive consent under the new law was Prince Harry.

Date	Applicant	Spouse	Privy Council Orders
14 March 2018	Prince Harry of Wales	Meghan Markle	Privy Council Orders for 14 March 2018

== See also ==
- Monarchy of the United Kingdom
- Succession to the British throne
- Royal Succession Act 2013, New Zealand legislation to implement the Perth Agreement.
- Equality (Titles) Bill, related UK legislation pertaining to the succession of female heirs to hereditary titles and peerages
