= Reva Seth =

- Born: Toronto, Ontario, Canada
- Education: University of British Columbia; Western Law School; Osgoode Hall Law School
- Occupations: Journalist, author, lawyer, consultant
- Spouse: Rana Sarkar (m. 2003)
- Children: 3

Reva Seth is a Canadian journalist, author, lawyer, strategic communications consultant, speaker, coach and entrepreneur.

== Early life and education ==
Reva Seth was born in Toronto to South Asian parents. She attended the University of British Columbia, where she studied international relations, and has an LLB from the University of Western Ontario and a Masters in Law (LLM) from Osgoode Hall Law School.

== Career ==
=== Early career ===
Early in her career, she worked as a lawyer in Toronto. She then worked in strategic and corporate communications in the UK and Canada for 10 years, with clients such as The British Council, Hewlett Packard, HSBC, and Factiva. She founded 7 Step Communications, a virtual PR agency.

=== 2008 book ===
For Seth's first book, First Comes Marriage: Modern Relationship Advice From the Wisdom of Arranged Marriages (2008), she spoke with over 300 women who were in arranged marriages to explore how traditions of arranged marriages can guide modern marriages to happiness. In a 2012 The Atlantic article, she notes that in an arranged marriage, "both people come into the relationship with a sense that this is forever", rather than "constantly asking ourselves: Could I do better? Would someone else make me happier?"

=== Current projects ===
She founded MomShift, a project about women who manage to combine being a mom with career success. She wrote The MomShift: Women Share Their Stories of Career Success After Having Children (2014). In an article about MomShift for the Calgary Herald, Seth notes that "...like so many young mothers in North America today,[she] was brought up to want it all: a happy family and a satisfying career." Her book argues that the "...tension between career and family ...has intensified."

She blogs for the Huffington Post. Most recently, Seth "has been the lead writer for the online project, "The Cities of Migration" which is focused local initiatives that create positive benefits from immigration." Her writing examines "social trends and cultural norms" regarding "shifting pattern of careers." She is on the board of the Trudeau Centre for Peace and Conflict Studies at the Munk School of Global Affairs at the University of Toronto.

She lives in Toronto with her husband and three sons.

== 2014 allegations ==
Seth was one of several individuals who contacted the media in October 2014 with allegations of abuse from former CBC radio host Jian Ghomeshi. Seth was the second woman, after actress Lucy DeCoutere, to identify herself when making abuse allegations against Ghomeshi. Ghomeshi's lawyer has said his client "does not engage in non-consensual role play or sex and any suggestion of the contrary is defamatory." In 2016 Ghomeshi was found not guilty of all allegations.
