= Randal Graham =

Canadian law professor, novelist

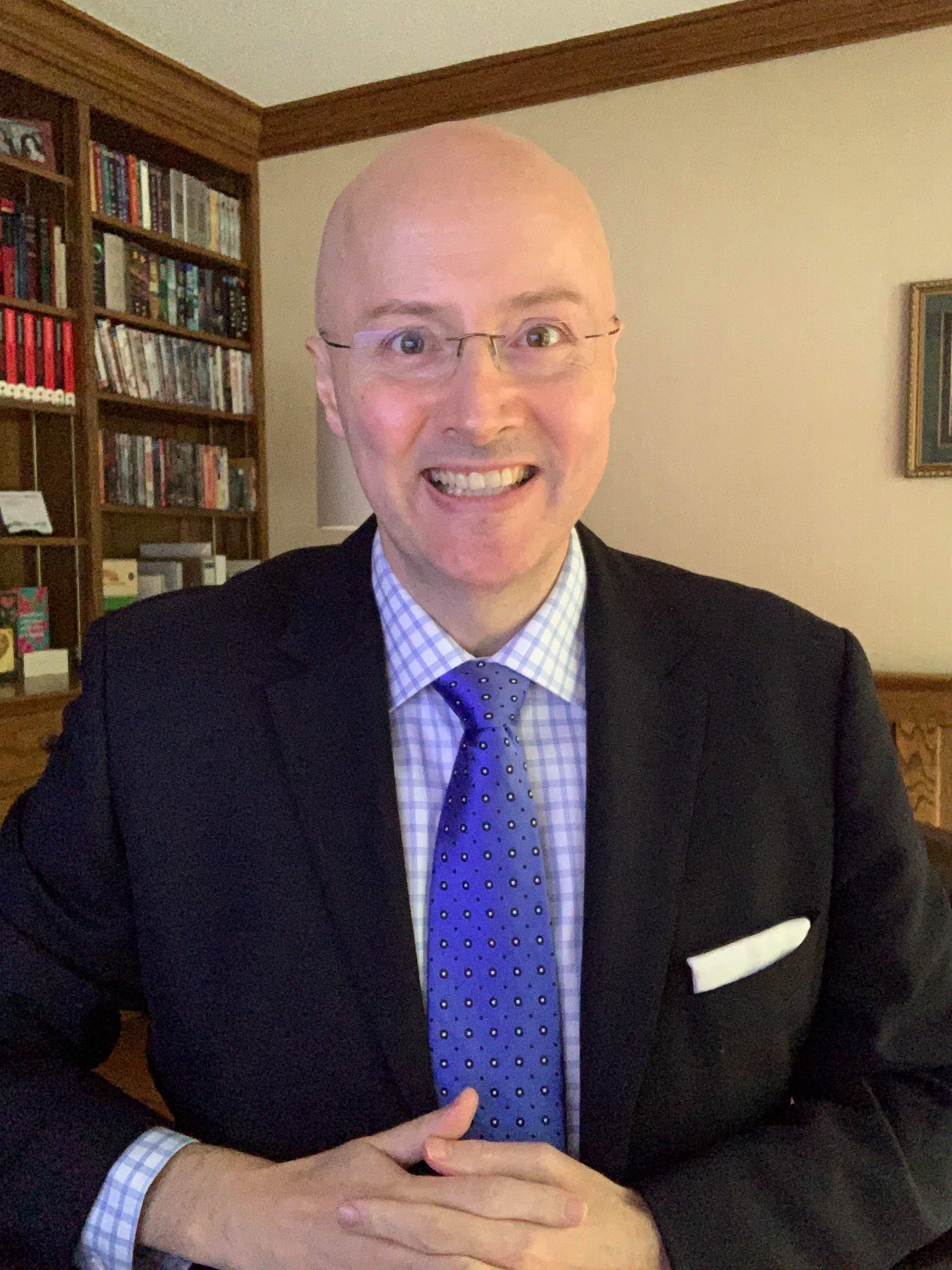
- Randal Graham in 2021.
- Born: Randal N.M. Graham; Peterborough, Ontario, Canada
- Education: Osgoode Hall Law School
- Occupations: Law scholar, lawyer, novelist
- Employer: The University of Western Ontario

Randal Graham is a Canadian law professor, novelist, and the Goodmans LLP Faculty Fellow in legal ethics at the University of Western Ontario Faculty of Law.

== Early life and education ==
Originally from Peterborough, Ontario, Graham earned a Bachelor of Laws from Osgoode Hall Law School at York University, followed by a Doctor of Philosophy from the same institution in 1999. While completing his dissertation, Graham worked under the supervision of Peter Hogg, for whom he had worked as a research assistant throughout his time in the LL.B. program.

== Career ==
From 1996 to 1997, Graham clerked at the Supreme Court of Canada under Mr. Justice John Sopinka after which he practised commercial law at Goodmans LLP. He served as an adjunct professor at Osgoode Hall Law School and an assistant professor at the University of New Brunswick before coming to the University of Western Ontario Faculty of Law in 2002, soon earning tenure and full professorship. In 2005, Graham was named "Faculty Scholar" for the international impact of his research. He has won awards for outstanding teaching, including the Edward G. Pleva Award for Excellence in Teaching, Western University's highest teaching-related honour.

In 2016, Graham testified in front of the Standing Senate Committee on Legal and Constitutional Affairs of the Senate of Canada regarding Bill C-14, An Act to amend the Criminal Code and to make related amendments to other Acts (medical assistance in dying) relating to euthanasia in Canada.

In 2017, Graham published his first novel, Beforelife, followed by its sequel, Afterlife Crisis, in 2020. Raoul Bhaneja narrated the audiobook version of Afterlife Crisis. The third novel of the trilogy, Nether Regions, was released in September 2022.

Beforelife won the Independent Publisher Book Awards Gold Medal for Fantasy Fiction. Both Beforelife and Afterlife Crisis were top ten finalists for the Stephen Leacock Memorial Medal for Humour.

Singer-songwriter, Treasa Levasseur, described Graham's Afterlife Crisis for CBC Radio The Next Chapter (radio program) as ". . . a sprawling, intellectual yet humorous book - like if Life of Brian by Monty Python was 14-and-a-half hours long and was written by a law professor at Western University."

Heather McBriarty of The Miramichi Reader described Graham's Nether Regions as ". . . a hilariously thought-provoking romp of a book in the finest tradition of Neil Gaiman, Douglas Adams, and Terry Pratchett. McBriarty noted, "Graham draws from both today's headlines and ancient myths to create a world like no other, and never hesitates to ask huge philosophical questions in the most outlandish of settings."

== Publications ==
=== Books ===
Legal books

- Graham, Randal (2001). Statutory Interpretation: Theory and Practice. Toronto: Emond. ISBN 9781552390634.
- Graham, Randal (2002). Statutory Interpretation: Cases, Text and Materials. Toronto: Emond. ISBN 9781552390917.
- Graham, Randal (2026). Graham on Statutory Interpretation. Toronto: ECW Press. ISBN 9781770418837.

Fiction

- Graham, Randal (2017). Beforelife. Toronto: ECW Press. ISBN 9781770413177.
- Graham, Randal (2020). Afterlife Crisis. Toronto: ECW Press. ISBN 9781770414709.
- Graham, Randal (2022). Nether Regions. Toronto: ECW Press. ISBN 9781770414716.

=== Selected articles and chapters ===
- Graham, Randal N.M. (2005). "Morality v Markets: An Economic Account of Legal Ethics". Legal Ethics. 8 (1): 87–106. doi:10.1080/1460728X.2005.11424227.
- Graham, Randal N.M. (2005). "In Defence of Ethinomics". Legal Ethics. 8 (1): 160–178. doi:10.1080/1460728X.2005.11424232.
- Graham, Randal N.M. (2006). "Right Theory, Wrong Reasons: Dynamic Interpretation, the Charter and "Fundamental Laws"". Supreme Court Law Review (2d). 34: 169–226. doi:10.60082/2563-8505.1095.
- Graham, Randal N.M. (2009). "What Judges Want: Judicial Self-interest and Statutory Interpretation". Statute Law Review. 30 (1): 38–72. doi:10.1093/slr/hmp002.
- Graham, Randal N.M. (2010). "Evolutionary Analysis: The Impact of Interpretive Theory". Manitoba Law Journal. 34 (1): 143–171. doi:10.29173/mlj775.
- Graham, Randal N.M. (2011). "The Myth of Originalism". Interpretatio non cessat: Essays in Honour of Pierre-André Côté. Éditions Yvon Blais. pp. 261–282. ISBN 9782896354894.

=== Videos ===
- Graham, Randal (8 May 2016). Building Accessibility for People with Disabilities into our Legislation: Avoiding the Creation of Unintended Barriers. Canadian Institute for the Administration of Justice.
- Graham, Randal (8 September 2017). Beforelife CBC Interview. CBC – via YouTube.
- Graham, Randal (13 April 2018). Beforelife CBC Interview. CBC – via YouTube.
- Graham, Randal (20 October 2020). Homecoming 2020 Western Law Ethics Webinar. University of Western Ontario – via YouTube.
- Graham, Randal (8 July 2022). Commencement Speech to Professional Graduates. University of Western Ontario. Event occurs at 34:15 – via Vimeo.
