= Erika Chamberlain =

Canadian legal scholar

Erika A. Chamberlain is a Canadian legal scholar. In 2017, Chamberlain was appointed to a five-year term as Dean of the University of Western Ontario Faculty of Law as a replacement for Iain Scott. Her research focuses on the field of impaired driving law and alcohol-related civil liability.

== Early life and education ==
Chamberlain was born in Canada to two German, working-class immigrants. She graduated from the University of Western Ontario Faculty of Law with her law degree in 2001 and began clerking for the Supreme Court of Canada. During this time, she collaborated with Professor Robert Solomon to compile a comprehensive review of the federal impaired driving legislation for MADD Canada.

== Career ==
After clerking for the Supreme Court of Canada, Chamberlain returned to her alma mater, Western Law, as an assistant professor in 2005. In this role, she co-established Western's Tort Law Research Group with Stephen Pitel and Jason Neyers. The aim of the group was to "provide a forum to stimulate further research and greater collaboration in the field of tort law." Two years later, Chamberlain was appointed Associate Dean (Academic) for a three year term. During her first year as Associate Dean, Chamberlain and Solomon worked with MADD again and released "Drug-Impaired Driving in Canada: Review and Recommendations for MADD Canada." She was also awarded a Western Strategic Support for SSHRC Success Bridge grant "Canada's Unique Conception of Fiduciary Relationships" in 2015.

In 2017, Chamberlain was appointed to a five-year term as Dean of Law to replace Iain Scott. During the COVID-19 pandemic, Chamberlain was appointed to the seven-person advisory board for the Supreme Court of Canada by Prime Minister Justin Trudeau. She also published Misfeasance in a Public Office which she had begun during her time as a law clerk. The book explains the history of the tort of misfeasance in public office and assesses its theoretical justifications and framework.

== Personal life ==
Chamberlain participates in Ironman competitions.
