= Peter Hogg =

New Zealand–Canadian legal scholar (1939–2020)

Peter Hogg CC QC FRSC
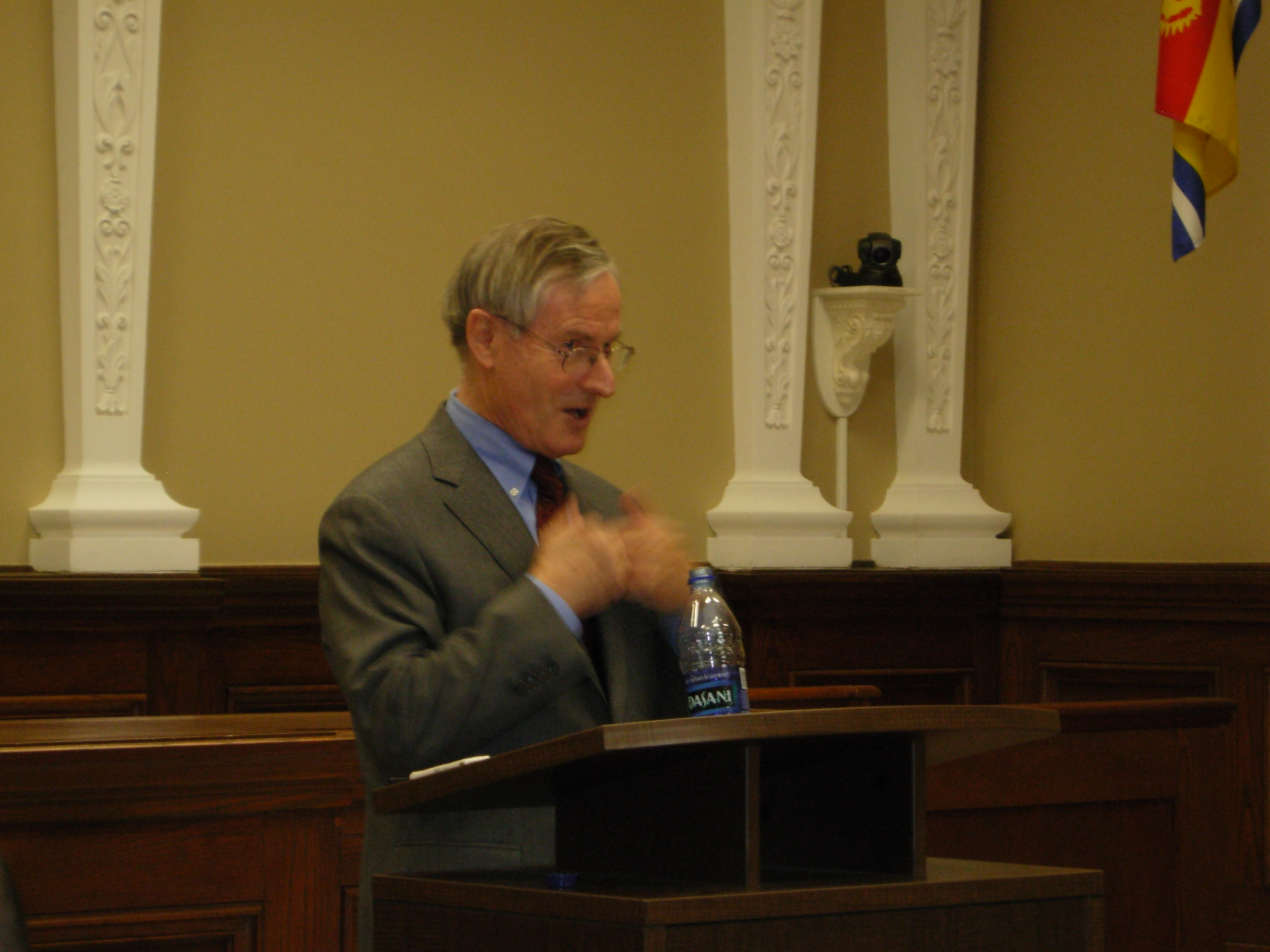
- Hogg speaking at the University of Western Ontario in 2010
- Born: Peter Wardell Hogg; 12 March 1939; Lower Hutt, New Zealand
- Died: 4 February 2020 (aged 80)

Academic background
- Education: Victoria University College; Harvard University; Monash University

Academic work
- Discipline: Law
- Sub-discipline: Constitutional law
- Institutions: Victoria University of Wellington; York University
- Doctoral students: Randal Graham
- Notable works: Constitutional Law of Canada

Peter Wardell Hogg CC QC FRSC (12 March 1939 – 4 February 2020) was a New Zealand–born Canadian legal scholar and lawyer. He was best known as a leading authority on Canadian constitutional law, with the most academic citations in Supreme Court jurisprudence of any living scholar during his lifetime, according to Emmett Macfarlane of the University of Waterloo.

== Early life and education ==
Born in Lower Hutt, New Zealand, on 12 March 1939, Hogg attended Nelson College from 1952 to 1956. He earned his LLB from Victoria University College, a constituent college of the University of New Zealand, in 1962, his LLM from Harvard University in 1963, and his PhD from Monash University in Melbourne, Australia, in 1970.

== Career ==
In 1970, he was appointed Professor of Law at Osgoode Hall Law School in Toronto and was appointed Dean in 1998. In 2003 he accepted a position as scholar in residence at the law firm of Blake, Cassels & Graydon LLP.

Hogg wrote several books, including Constitutional Law of Canada, the single most-cited book in decisions of the Supreme Court of Canada. In 2004, he was lead counsel for the Canadian government in the Supreme Court's same-sex marriage reference. Hogg also advised the committee that studied Marshall Rothstein's nomination to the Supreme Court, saying the creation of the committee was important to Canada's legal history and informing it that it should not ask political questions about abortion and same-sex marriage.

Hogg supported judicial restraint in cases dealing with disputes over Canadian federalism.

Hogg was the academic supervisor of Randal Graham during Graham's PhD studies at Osgoode Hall Law School.

== Death ==
Hogg died on 4 February 2020.

== Honours ==
- 1980 – appointed a Queen's Counsel
- 1988 – named a Fellow of the Royal Society of Canada.
- 1991 – made an Officer of the Order of Canada.
- 1996 – awarded Law Society Medal by the Law Society of Upper Canada.
- 2003 – promoted to Companion of the Order of Canada.
- 2003 – received the Canadian Bar Association's Ramon John Hnatyshyn Award for Law, which recognizes outstanding contributions to the law and legal scholarship in Canada.
- 2003 – received from the Law Society of Upper Canada an honorary degree of Doctor of Laws (LLD)
- 2005 – received from Université de Montréal an honorary Doctorate.
- 2006 – received from Victoria University of Wellington in New Zealand an honorary Doctor of Laws degree (LLD)
- 2006 – received from York University an honorary Doctor of Laws.

== Selected works ==
- Hogg, Peter W. (2007) [1st ed. pub. 1977]. Constitutional Law of Canada (5th ed.). Toronto: Carswell. ISBN 978-0-7798-1337-7.
- —; Monahan, Patrick J.; Wright, Wade K. (2011) [1st ed. pub. 1971]. Liability of the Crown (4th ed.). Toronto: Carswell. ISBN 978-0-7798-3635-2. After Hogg's death, this text now includes his name as an honourific, with the most recent edition thus: Monahan, Patrick J.; Wright, Wade K.; Chamberlain, Erika (2024). Hogg's Liability of the Crown (5th ed.). Toronto: Thomson Reuters Canada. ISBN 978-1-0382-0554-4.
- —; Magee, Joanne E.; Li, Jinyan (2013) [1st ed. pub. 1995]. Principles of Canadian Income Tax Law (8th ed.). Toronto: Carswell. ISBN 978-0-7798-5513-1.

Academic offices
Preceded by Marilyn L. Pilkington	Dean of Law at York University; 1998–2003	Succeeded by Patrick J. Monahan
