= Succession to the Throne Act, 2013 =

Canadian statute changing royal succession

Parliament of Canada
- Long title: An Act to assent to alterations in the law touching the Succession to the Throne
- Citation: S.C. 2013, c. 6
- Considered by: House of Commons of Canada
- Considered by: Senate of Canada
- Royal assent: 27 March 2013
- Commenced: 26 March 2015

Legislative history

Initiating chamber: House of Commons of Canada
- Bill citation: Bill C-53
- Introduced by: Rob Nicholson, Minister of Justice
- Introduced: 31 January 2013
- First reading: 31 January 2013
- Second reading: 4 February 2013
- Third reading: 4 February 2013
- Committee report: Presented: 26 March 2013

Revising chamber: Senate of Canada
- First reading: February 5, 2013
- Second reading: March 7, 2013
- Third reading: March 26, 2013
- Status: In force

The Succession to the Throne Act, 2013 (French: Loi de 2013 sur la succession au trône), gave Canada's assent to the United Kingdom's 2013 changes to the rules of succession to the British throne. It was passed by the Parliament of Canada as Bill C-53, and received royal assent on 27 March 2013. The act was brought into force by the Governor-General-in-Council on 26 March 2015.

There was disagreement over the act's constitutionality and effectiveness in altering the line of succession to the Canadian throne. A challenge in Ontario Superior Court (Teskey v. Canada (Attorney General)) argued the law was unconstitutional, but it was dismissed at the Superior Court in 2013, and unsuccessfully appealed in 2014. Another challenge was filed in the Superior Court of Quebec (Motard c. Canada (Procureur général)), but in 2016 the Superior Court dismissed the application, leaving the act in place. The Quebec Court of Appeal upheld that ruling in 2019. In 2020, the Supreme Court of Canada dismissed an application for leave to appeal, leaving the Court of Appeal decision standing.

== Background ==
After questions from the media were prompted in April 2011 by the introduction to the British Parliament of a private member's bill seeking to change British royal succession from male-preference to absolute, Prime Minister Stephen Harper was criticized for his ambivalence toward amendment of the line of succession in Canada, being contrasted with Prime Minister of New Zealand John Key and Deputy Prime Minister of the United Kingdom Nick Clegg. Harper stated: "The successor to the throne is a man. The next successor to the throne is a man ... I don't think Canadians want to open a debate on the monarchy or constitutional matters at this time. That's our position. I just don't see that as a priority for Canadians right now at all."

On 28 October 2011, at the Commonwealth Heads of Government Meeting held in Perth, Western Australia, the heads of government of the 16 Commonwealth realms announced that they would introduce legislation to end the primacy of males over females and the disqualification of persons married to Catholic spouses in the succession to the Crown. In a letter to the other realms' heads of government, prior to the Perth Agreement, British Prime Minister David Cameron additionally proposed to limit the requirement to obtain the monarch's permission to marry to the first six people in line to the throne.

Harper stated in October 2011 that, "at some point, we will table legislation in the House of Commons and it would be my hope that that would be approved quickly." In an email to Postmedia News in December 2012, a spokesperson for the Prime Minister stated that the Canadian government was waiting for the British government to reveal its proposed legislation before "enact[ing] these changes in coordination with our realm partners". At the same time, a spokesperson for the New Democratic Party (the official opposition in the 41st Parliament) explained the party was in favour of the reforms. A spokesperson for the federal minister of justice stated a constitutional amendment was not required and the minister intended to present the proposed legislation to Parliament without obtaining the consent of the provinces.

== Bill C-53 ==
=== Content of the bill ===
The content of the act is identical to Bill C-53, which was passed unamended. From its inception as a bill the long title has been An Act to Assent to Alterations in the Law Touching the Succession to the Throne and the short title has been the Succession to the Throne Act, 2013. As a bill, it consisted of a long preamble and three short provisions. The preamble outlined the monarch's powers as prescribed by the Constitution Act, 1867, followed by a summary of the Perth Agreement and the quoted preamble of Statute of Westminster, 1931, which expressed the convention that an alteration of the succession rules be assented to by the respective parliaments of all Commonwealth realms. It ended with the acknowledgement of the introduction of the Succession to the Crown Bill 2012 in the Parliament of the United Kingdom. Clause 1 provided the short title; clause 2 stated that the alteration in the law touching the succession to the throne set out in the Succession to the Crown Bill 2012, as laid before the British Parliament "is assented to"; and clause 3 allowed the Governor General-in-Council to determine the effective date.

The wording of clause 2 of the bill was nearly identical to the similar section in the Succession to the Throne Act, 1937, passed by the Parliament of Canada to legislatively ratify the Canadian Cabinet's earlier consent to the taking into the laws of Canada of His Majesty's Declaration of Abdication Act 1936, the act of the British Parliament that effected the abdication of Edward VIII as king of Canada, the United Kingdom, and the other Dominions. The Succession to the Throne Act, 1937, stated, "the alteration in the law touching the succession to the throne set forth in the act of the Parliament of the United Kingdom intituled 'His Majesty's Declaration of Abdication Act, 1936' is hereby assented to." The Succession to the Throne Act, 1937, however, also included His Majesty's Declaration of Abdication Act 1936 in a schedule, something the Succession to the Throne Act, 2013, does not do with the Succession to the Crown Bill 2012.

=== In the House of Commons ===
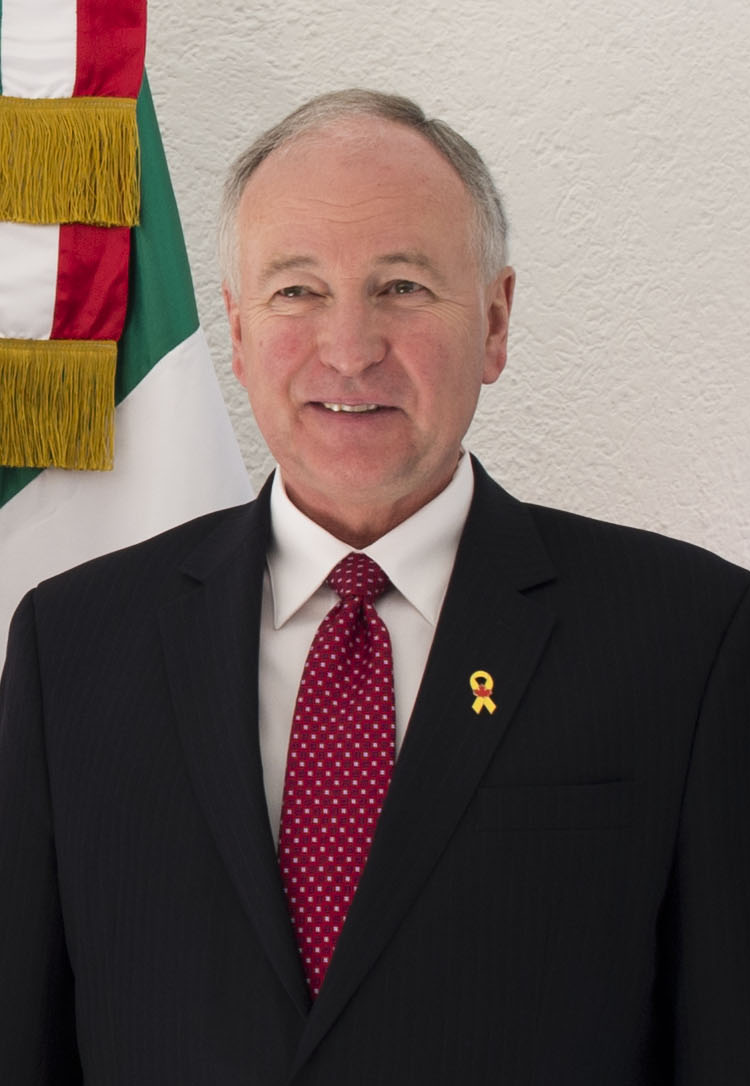
Minister of Justice Rob Nicholson, who tabled Bill C-53 in the House of Commons

Bill C-53 was, along with English- and French-language versions of the Succession to the Crown Bill 2012, tabled in the House of Commons by Justice Minister Rob Nicholson on 31 January 2013 and given first reading. At the time, Nicholson stated to the House that the Governor General had "given his consent as far as Her Majesty's prerogatives may be affected to the consideration by Parliament of the bill..." On 4 February 2013, the bill passed the House of Commons without debate and moved to the Senate.

=== In the Senate ===
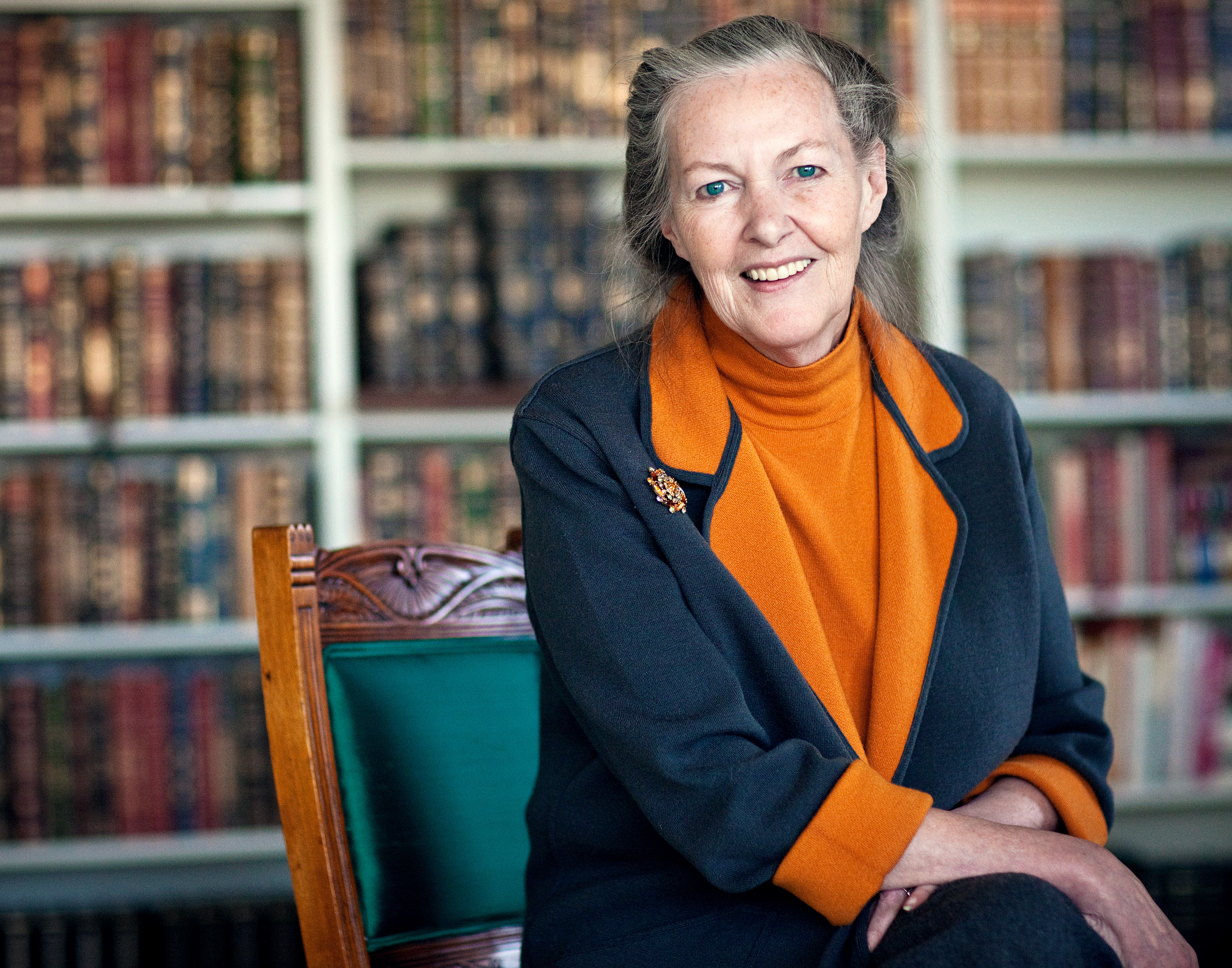
Senator Elaine McCoy, who opposed Bill C-53

Before the bill was put before the upper chamber, Senators Elaine McCoy, Serge Joyal, and Hugh Segal were all quoted in Maclean's as desiring a debate in the Senate on Bill C-53. McCoy stated her opinion that the bill was meaningless, as a law passed after 1982 by Britain's Parliament cannot have any effect in Canada, while Segal expressed his support for the bill and the government's rationale behind it. All agreed a constitutional amendment would not be required.

On 5 February, the bill received its first reading in the Senate and the Succession to the Crown Bill 2012–13 was tabled. The bill's second reading in the Senate took place on 7 March 2013 and it was referred to the Standing Senate Committee on Legal and Constitutional Affairs. There, on 20 and 21 March, the committee heard from Associate Professor Andrew Heard of Simon Fraser University; Professor of Law Benoît Pelletier, from the University of Ottawa; Vice-Chairman Paul Benoit and Executive Director Garry Toffoli of the Canadian Royal Heritage Trust; Rob Nicholson; Karen Audcent, Donald Piragoff, and Warren Newman from the Department of Justice; and Joe Wild, Assistant Secretary to the Cabinet. The bill was returned to the Senate from the committee on 21 March 2013, unamended.

=== Third reading in the Senate, royal assent, and commencement ===
In debate during the third reading, on 25 and 26 March, Senator Joan Fraser said that the Canadian Parliament was being asked to assent to a bill passed by a foreign parliament, the final form of which had not yet been seen, and that the Canadian bill was to give assent to the bill "laid before" the Parliament at Westminster, which had been amended since first presented there. Fraser commented that when the Senate had given the bill third reading, she would take that as formal notification that assent was being given to the bill eventually passed in Westminster, but it would have been preferable if Canada had done as Australia and New Zealand were doing: instead of passing a bill to assent to another parliament's legislation, they were passing their own, standalone legislation, thereby asserting that the monarch of each country is whomever each country's laws determines it to be.

Senator Serge Joyal responded by saying that Bill C-53 assented to the British bill by its title, not all its clauses. He argued that the legal force of a bill is essentially a legislative intention, to which some precision can be given, as had been done through the amendments made to the Succession to the Crown Bill 2012 by the British Parliament. The original intention approved by all of the 16 prime ministers of the Commonwealth realms had not been altered, but instead made more precise.

At the cessation of debate, the bill passed unamended and received royal assent the next day. The act was brought into force by order-in-council by the Governor General on 26 March 2015, the same day as the other Commonwealth realms that required their own legislation.

== Constitutional issues ==
=== Cabinet position ===
The government's stated position in 2013 was that "The changes to the laws of succession do not require a constitutional amendment. The laws governing succession are UK law and are not part of Canada's constitution. Specifically, they are not enumerated in the schedule to our Constitution Act, 1982, as part of the constitution of Canada. Furthermore, the changes to the laws of succession do not constitute a change to the 'office of The Queen', as contemplated in the Constitution Act, 1982. The office of the Queen includes the sovereign's constitutional status, powers, and rights in Canada. Neither the ban on the marriages of heirs to Roman Catholics, nor the common law governing male preference primogeniture, can properly be said to be royal powers or prerogatives in Canada. As the line of succession is therefore determined by UK law and not by the sovereign, the Queen's powers and rights have not been altered by the changes to the laws governing succession in Canada."

=== Judicial precedent ===
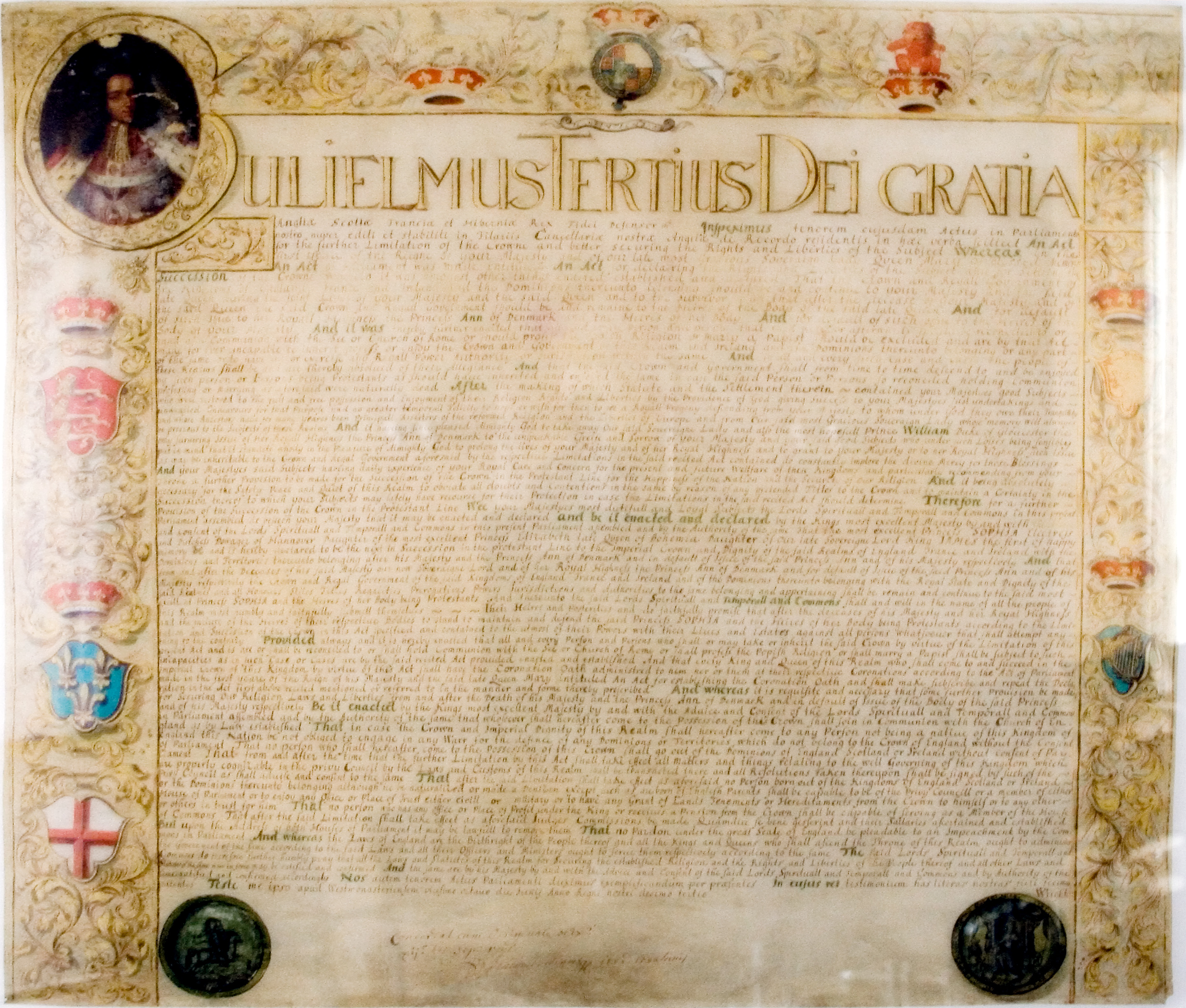
The Act of Settlement, 1701

The Supreme Court of Canada declared unanimously in the 1981 Patriation Reference that the Bill of Rights, 1689, a law requiring amendment to implement the desired changes to royal succession, is "undoubtedly in force as part of the law of Canada". Furthermore, in O'Donohue v. Canada (2003) the Ontario Superior Court of Justice found that the Act of Settlement, 1701, is "part of the laws of Canada" and the rules of succession are "by necessity incorporated into the constitution of Canada". Another ruling of the Ontario Superior Court, in 2014, echoed the 2003 case, stating that the Act of Settlement "is an imperial statute which ultimately became part of the law of Canada." Upon dismissing appeal of that case, the Court of Appeal of Ontario stated "[t]he rules of succession are a part of the fabric of the constitution of Canada and incorporated into it".

Under section 41 of the Constitution Act, 1982, changes to the office of the monarch require unanimous consent of all the provinces and the federal Parliament. If changes to the line of succession to the Canadian throne were found to fall under this provision, it is possible that any single provincial legislature could hinder attempts at change. In the aforementioned court decision, Justice J. Rouleau determined that "unilateral changes by Canada to the rules of succession" would be "a fundamental change in the office of the Queen" requiring authorizations pursuant to section 41 of the Constitution Act, 1982. The precedent in question does not specify whether non-unilateral alterations to the rules of succession would also be considered a fundamental change in the office of Queen, requiring a constitutional amendment under the unanimous consent procedure. The judge stated that "a constitutional monarchy, where the monarch is shared with the United Kingdom and other Commonwealth countries, is, in [his] view, at the root of [Canada's] constitutional structure".

=== Provincial input ===
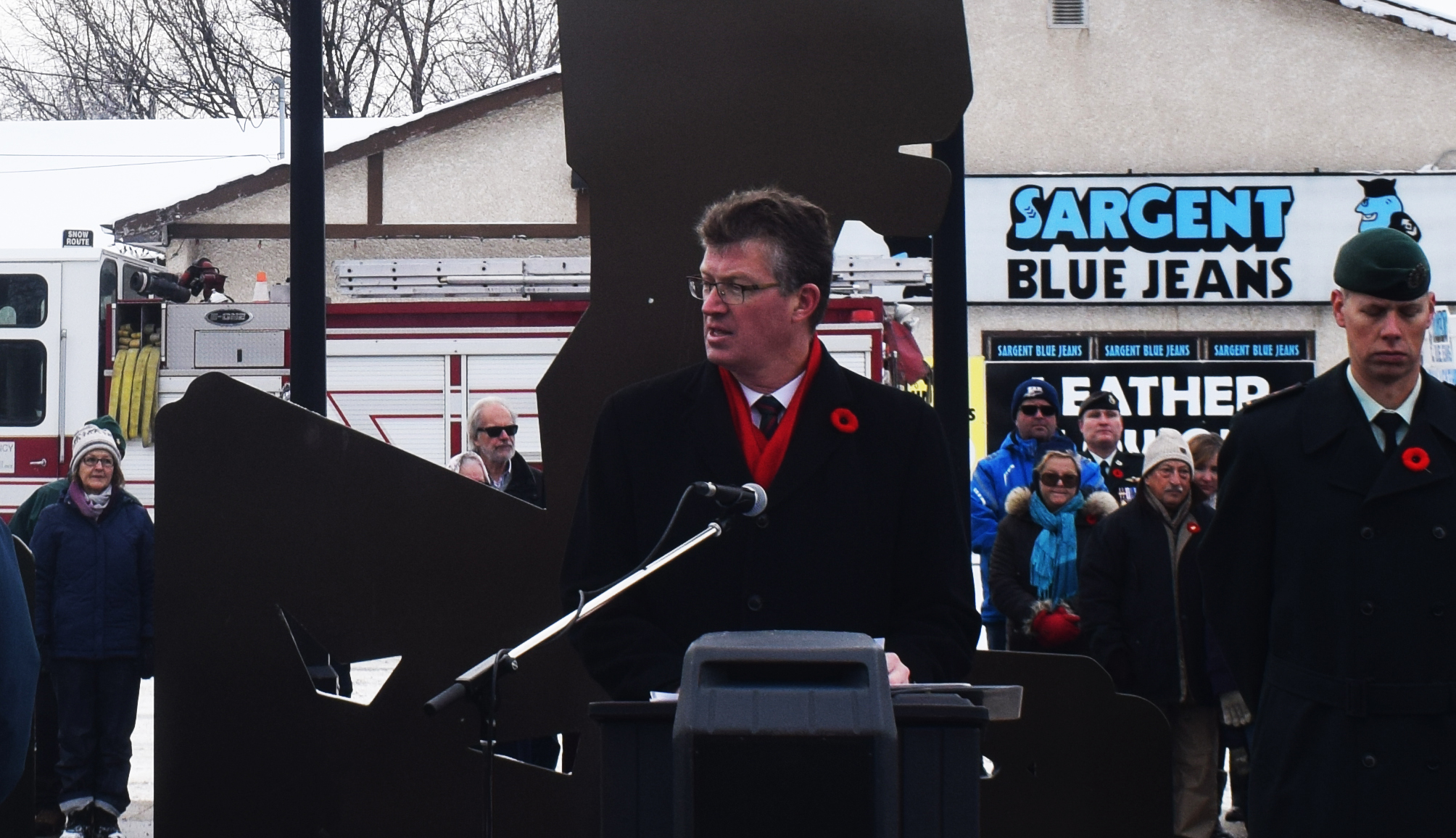
Attorney General of Manitoba Andrew Swan

As a matter of common practice for Senate committees reviewing legislation in which a province or territory may have interest, the clerk of the Legal and Constitutional Affairs Committee in March 2013 contacted each provincial cabinet. The only response came from Andrew Swan, Manitoba's attorney general, who stated in a letter dated 6 March 2013 that, although the Government of Manitoba held no opposition to the proposed changes themselves, "alterations to the constitutional and legal framework of our nation require consultation with and participation by provinces and territories that is timely and meaningful" and stressed that the way in which Bill C-53 was proceeding would not be considered "a precedent for the process to be followed should other circumstances arise in the future."

=== Presentations to parliamentary committee ===
Aside from the Minister of Justice, there were three presentations made to the Standing Senate Committee on Legal and Constitutional Affairs regarding Bill C-53.

Gary Toffoli and Paul Benoit of the Canadian Royal Heritage Trust outlined how the British and Canadian governments agreed during the abdication crisis in 1936 that whoever is monarch of the UK is not automatically monarch of Canada and, thus, the alteration of the succession in Britain by British law would not extend to Canada without the latter's request and consent that it do so. In line with that, Tofolli argued the term "Crown of the United Kingdom of Great Britain and Ireland" contained in the preamble to the Constitution Act, 1867, should be interpreted at present not as the "Crown of the United Kingdom of Great Britain and Northern Ireland" (the successor to the Crown of the United Kingdom of Great Britain and Ireland following the independence of the Irish Free State in 1922), as the government has claimed it should be read, but instead as the "Crown of Canada", as per both further, post-1922 constitutional development and the Interpretation Act, 1985. (He later wrote "there is no merit in arguing that there was evolution but that it stopped before the Statute of Westminster [...] [T]he Crown of Canada must be read as coincident with, not dependent upon, the Crown of the United Kingdom in the Constitution Act, 1867.") As further evidence of Canada and the UK having separate monarchical offices, Toffoli pointed to the proclamation of Queen Elizabeth II's accession taking place in Canada before she was proclaimed sovereign in the UK.

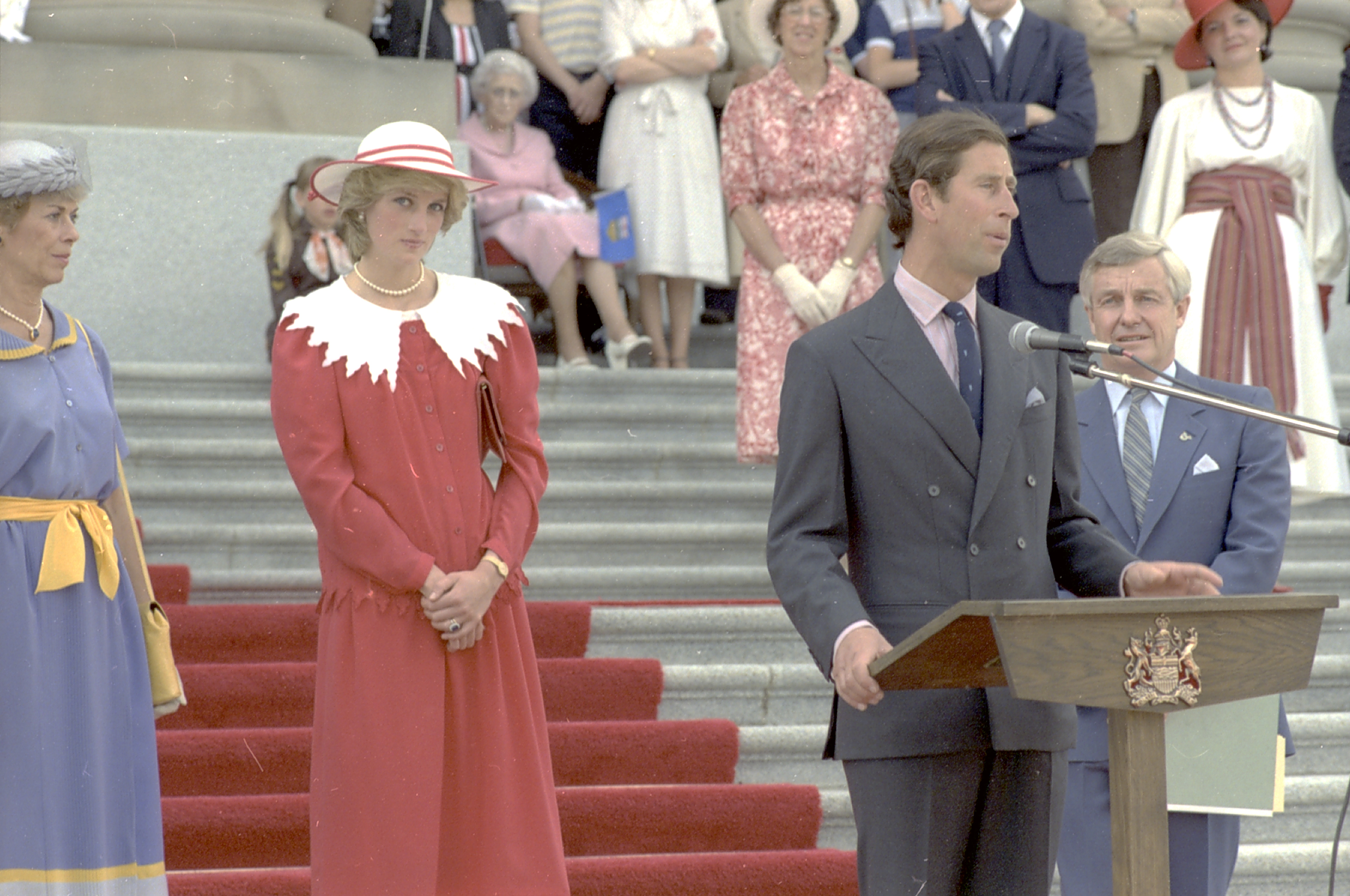
Prince Charles and Diana, Princess of Wales, in Edmonton, Alberta. The Queen's Privy Council for Canada approved their engagement in 1981

According to Toffoli and Benoit, Canada now has its own succession laws, not only via the principle of received law, but also by virtue of the Canadian Cabinet's request and consent to His Majesty's Declaration of Abdication Act 1936, which, according to section 4 of the Statute of Westminster, brought that act to Canada as "part of the law of that dominion". The Canadian Parliament's subsequent Succession to the Throne Act, 1937 (required only by convention outlined in the preamble to the Statute of Westminster), ratified the Cabinet's earlier action and contains the full text of His Majesty's Declaration of Abdication Act, which itself outlines its effects on the Act of Settlement 1701 and Royal Marriages Act 1772. (Further proof of the existence of the Royal Marriages Act in Canadian law is, according to Toffoli, provided by the approval by the Queen in her Canadian Council in 1981 to the marriage of Prince Charles and Lady Diana Spencer separately to the same approval given by the Queen in her British Council.) Thus, Canada's Succession to the Throne Act, 1937, "is the statutory repository of the law of Succession for Canada", meaning "it is irrelevant whether or not [the succession laws are enumerated in the schedule to the Constitution Act, 1982], as [the laws] had already been [patriated] in 1937". Given the subsequent repeal of section 4 of the Statute of Westminster in Canada and the enactment of section 2 of the Canada Act, 1982, the United Kingdom's Succession to the Crown Act 2012 has no effect on Canada's succession laws, regardless of the Canadian Parliament's assent to it. He claimed the Canadian Parliament could possibly alter Canada's succession laws simply by amending Schedule 2 of the 1937 act. The necessity of the consent of the provinces open to debate.

Andrew Heard, an associate professor at Simon Fraser University, and Benoît Pelletier, a University of Ottawa professor, both members of the Monarchist League of Canada, offered legal arguments that bill C-53 was constitutionally permissible. Heard made the positive assertion that the Succession to the Throne Act, 2013 was actually unnecessary, as Canadian law dictates that "'whoever is the British monarch is [Canada's] head of state'", and that this principle would extend automatically to hypothetical future United Kingdom legislation on royal succession. Pelletier approached the question differently, stating that the bill did not touch upon the constitutional powers of the Office of the Queen and, hence, was not a constitutional amendment requiring the support of the provincial legislatures.

=== Academic and media commentary ===
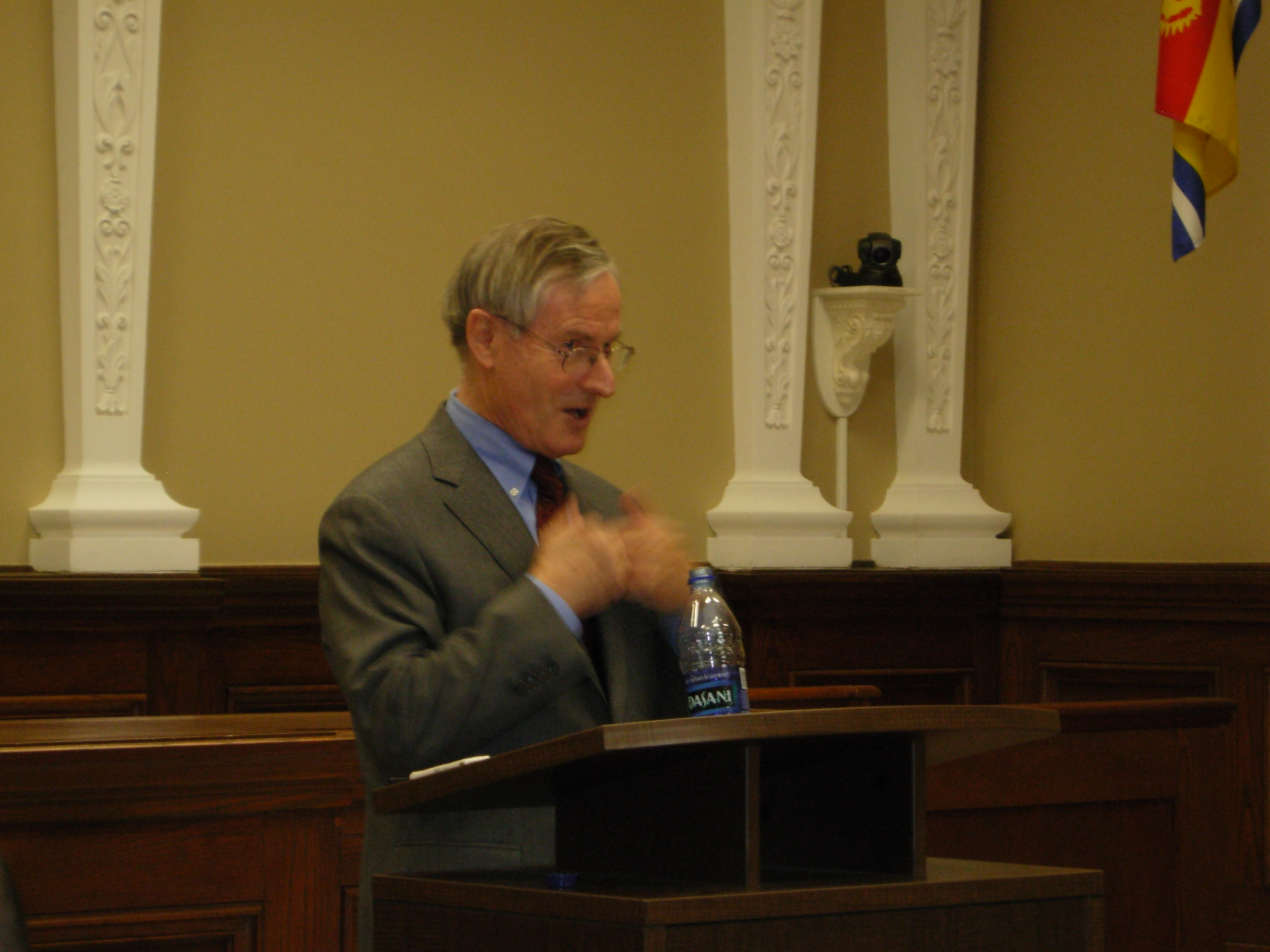
Peter Hogg, who opined that alterations to the rules of royal succession in Canada would require a constitutional amendment

University of Ottawa professor Philippe Lagassé expressed in the media his disagreement with the government's proposed method of changing the succession in Canada, noting that, in the patriation of the Canadian constitution, section 4 of the Statute of Westminster (which required Canada's request for and consent to a British law before any such law became part of the laws of Canada) was repealed and section 2 of the Canada Act, 1982, also part of the Canadian constitution, subsequently and absolutely disallowed the Parliament of the United Kingdom from legislating for Canada. Furthermore, Lagassé argued first that, as the Canadian Crown is a corporation sole, in which the office and office holder are regarded by law as inseparable, changing how the office holder is selected is a change to the office itself and, secondly, that, by seeking Royal Consent to the bill from the Governor General (which is required for any proposed law that will affect the monarch's prerogatives and privileges), the Justice Minister indicated that the alteration to the succession does indeed touch on "the Sovereign's constitutional status, powers and rights". Patrick Taillon, a professor of constitutional rights at Laval University, wrote in Le Devoir that he also felt the alterations to the succession should trigger Section 41 of the Constitution Act, 1982, and argued that certain laws related to the structures of the state were "constitutionalized" by the patriation of the constitution, despite not being listed in section 52(2) of the Constitution Act, 1982; the Supreme Court Act, for example.

Anne Twomey of the University of Sydney also alluded to Canada having its own laws of royal succession separate from those of the UK when she speculated in a paper on the matter of succession changes that "no United Kingdom law changing the law of succession could extend to Canada" and "[i]f, for example, Prince William had a first born daughter and a second born son, it is conceivable that if the United Kingdom changed its law of succession and Canada did not, the daughter would become Queen of the United Kingdom and the son would become King of Canada." Twomey later highlighted the fact that Canada is not included among the territories the British bill lists as being affected by it, and she stated both that the Canadian bill was ineffective and the government's methods amounted to a "de-patriation of the Canadian constitution".

A Queen's University professor of law, Mark Walters, supported the government's position, agreeing that Canada has no laws of succession, since the preamble of the Constitution Act, 1867 (which states, "whereas the provinces of Canada, Nova Scotia, and New Brunswick have expressed their desire to be federally united into One dominion under the crown of the United Kingdom of Great Britain and Ireland [sic], with a constitution similar in principle to that of the United Kingdom") should be interpreted as meaning Canada must always have as its monarch the same person as is monarch of the United Kingdom of Great Britain and Northern Ireland. He concluded that, though "it makes sense for the Canadian Parliament to comply with the convention that it recognizes [that its consent be granted to a change by Britain to its royal succession laws]", the Succession to the Throne Act, 2013, is not necessary, since it "is not required by, and will have no effect upon, existing Canadian law".

Following the passage of the bill through Parliament, Lee Ward, an associate professor of Political Science at the University of Regina, wrote that the government's proposed method of altering the line of succession in Canada dissolved "the decades-old notion that the British Crown and Canadian Crown are separate legal entities, as Canada's government concedes that the British Parliament will decide in the 21st century who will be our head of state", thereby possibly "requir[ing] radical reconsideration of the position of the monarchy in the Canadian constitution". Ward did, however, acknowledge the political desire to avoid embarking on amending the constitution with Canadian law, which would require the approval of all the provinces.

The Monarchist League of Canada supported the government's method of amending the succession, while the Canadian Royal Heritage Trust and Citizens for a Canadian Republic stated, respectively, that the same was ineffectual and unconstitutional. University of Toronto history lecturer Carolyn Harris noted a "political controversy" around the same subject.

=== Judicial review ===
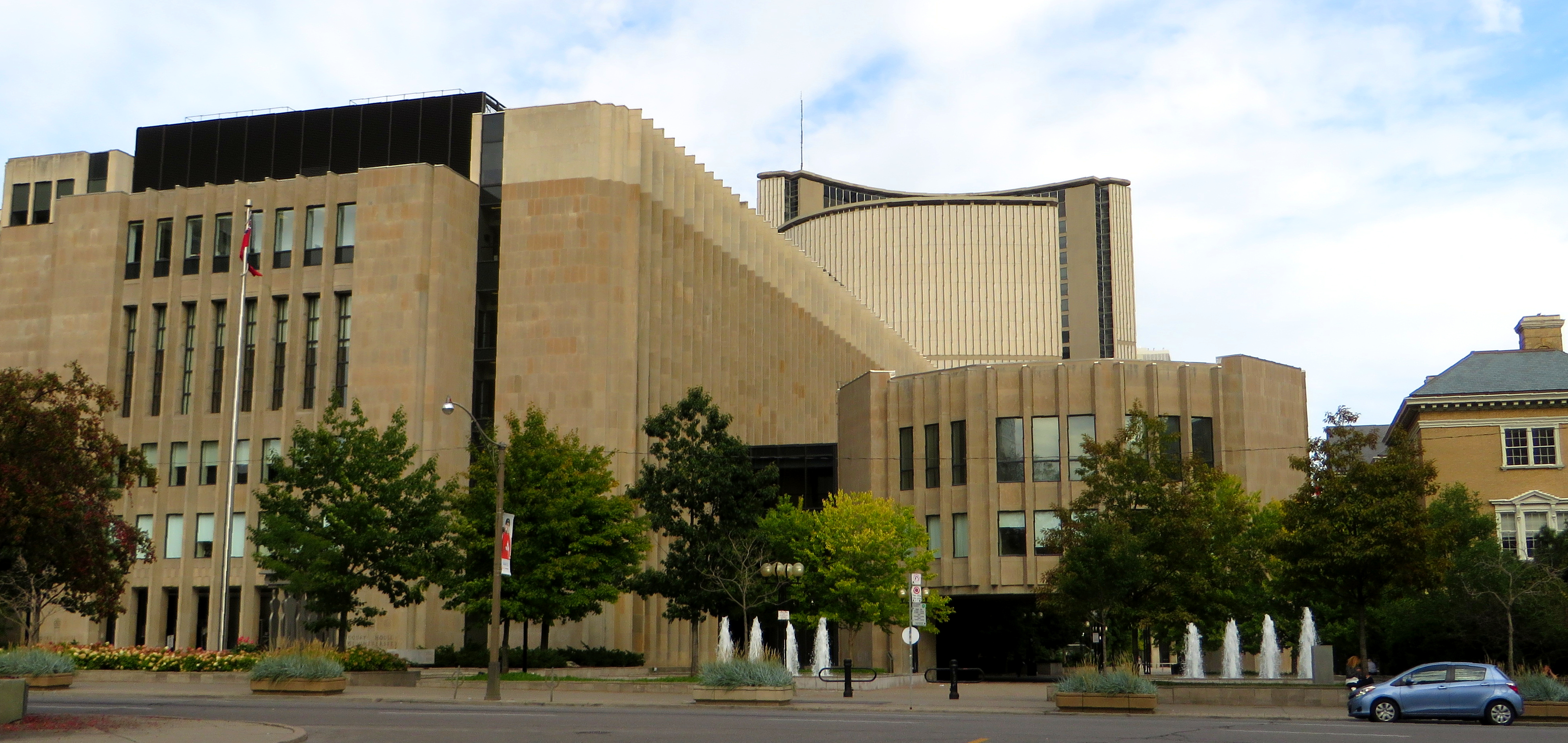
The Ontario Superior Court of Justice in Toronto, Ontario

In the hearing of an application to the Ontario Superior Court of Justice, presented on 7 March 2013, Bryan Teskey argued that the Succession to the Throne Act, 2013 was unconstitutional, being in violation both of section 2 of the Canada Act, 1982 (as it endeavoured to allow a British law to have force in Canada), and of section 15 of the Charter of Rights and Freedoms (as it assented to a law that does not eliminate the prohibition of Roman Catholics from the royal line of succession). Citing the earlier Ontario Superior Court case O'Donohue v Canada, in which section II of the Act of Settlement was challenged, Justice Charles Hackland on 9 August dismissed Teskey's case, stating the rules of succession are both a part of the constitutional law of Canada, and thus cannot be invalidated by another part of the constitution (the charter), and beyond the review of the court. Though the ruling confirmed the Act of Settlement, 1701, is a part of Canadian law, it made no mention of the matter of Section 2 of the Canada Act or how the Act of Settlement in Canadian law would be affected by a British act of Parliament. Teskey appealed the decision, but, in August 2014, the Court of Appeal for Ontario upheld the lower court decision.

On 7 June 2013, two professors from Laval University, Geneviève Motard and Patrick Taillon, reported as representing a group with "a broad spectrum of political views in Quebec: some sovereigntist, some federalist, some supportive of the monarchy and others with more republican views", filed a motion with the Superior Court of Quebec asking for the Succession to the Throne Act, 2013, to be ruled unconstitutional. It stated that its aim was not to contest the political decision to amend the rules regarding the designation of the head of state, but instead argued the act endeavours to amend the constitution—specifically the parts designating "the head of state of both federal and provincial orders of government"—but its enactment did not follow the constitutional amending formula set out in section 41 of the Constitution Act, 1982; if the act does not amend the constitution, it is in violation of the Canadian Charter of Rights and Freedoms because it assents to a bill that does not repeal those provisions of the Act of Settlement disallowing Roman Catholics from becoming monarch of Canada; and it also approves of a British bill not written in both French and English, as required of Canadian legislation by the constitution.

Motard and Taillon further argued that rules of succession dating back to 17th century have been received into Canadian constitutional law and that the Crown has been divisible, with one person being separate sovereigns for each of the Commonwealth realms and thus Canada having a crown that is unique from Britain's or other realms', since the Statute of Westminster, 1931, and that the practice of the Canadian Parliament assenting to the application of British legislation to Canada ended with the patriation of the Canadian constitution in 1982 and the repeal of Section 4 of the Statute of Westminster. In May 2015, Motard and Taillon's lawyer asserted that the federal government's position is that "British law applies automatically in Canada", which he described as "colonial".

Before launching their challenge, the plaintiffs consulted with "like-minded lawyers, academics and monarchy experts from across Canada". On 14 June 2013, Antonia Maioni, an associate professor from McGill University, noted that she found it ironic that Quebec sovereignists were basing their attempts to "shore up Quebec's veto" over constitutional change based on the argument that Elizabeth II is also the "Queen of Quebec". It was reported in July 2013 that the Quebec Crown-in-Council had joined as an intervener in support of the challenge, also supported by the Canadian Royal Heritage Trust.

The federal justice minister had the option of referring the question directly to the Supreme Court of Canada for a final ruling, though a spokesperson for the minister stated that this possibility would not be pursued. A preliminary hearing took place on 15 August 2013. The hearing in Quebec City, before Justice Claude Bouchard of the Quebec Superior Court, began on 1 June 2015. The federal government was due to reply by 10 October, with another month for a reply from the challenging parties. On 16 February 2016, Bouchard ruled that Canada "did not have to change its laws nor its Constitution for the British royal succession rules to be amended and effective" and constitutional convention committed Canada to having a lines of succession symmetrical to those of other Commonwealth realms. The ruling was appealed by the plaintiffs and a hearing was held by the Quebec Court of Appeal in February 2018. The court released its decision upholding the lower court judgement on 28 October 2019. The plaintiffs completed an application for leave to appeal the Court of Appeal's decision to the Supreme Court of Canada on 24 December 2019. On 23 April 2020, the Supreme Court of Canada declined the application for leave to appeal, bringing the matter to a close.

=== Academic review ===
Twomey in 2017 wrote, "from an outsider's perspective, [the Canadian government's approach] looks like a stark case of short-term political pragmatism taking priority over fundamental constitutional principle", done to avoid the question of whether changes to the rules of royal succession affect the office of the monarch in order to avoid any need to obtain approval from the parliament of Quebec. Twomey went on to claim, "it defies history and precedent and appears to cause Canada to revert to a pre-1926 dominion status." She also took issue with Bouchard's ruling, arguing five points: 1) It did not address whether statutes that expressly stated they applied to Britain's colonies are part of the laws (as opposed to the constitution) of Canada. 2) Given Rouleau ruled the Act of Settlement's bar on Catholics and anyone married to a Catholic aceeding to the throne "are an integral part of the Canadian constitution", the British Succession to the Crown Act 2013, which removed the exclusion of persons married to Catholics, is in conflict with that entrenched constitutional position. 3) Neither the Bill of Rights, 1689, nor Act of Settlement, 1701, contain any rule of recognition or rule of symmetry. (Note: Twomey pointed out that the Act of Settlement, 1701, which stipulates that heirs to the throne of the United Kingdom must be descendants of Sophia, Electress of Hanover, did not impose a rule of recognition that the monarch of Britain must also be the monarch of Hanover. As such, the personal union between the United Kingdom and Hanover ended when William IV died and the salic law of succession in Hanover barred Victoria from inheriting its throne, the Hanoverian crown passing, instead, to William's brother, the Duke of Cumberland. Thus, if any principle were to be drawn from the Bill of Rights and Act of Settlement regarding application of the rules of succession to separate crowns, it would be that Britain and its colonies have one crown, but, where there is a personal union of independent nations, each nation's law of succession determines the inheritance of the relevant crown. Twomey stated that is also "consistent with the principle of equality to be found in the Statute of Westminster, which clearly forms part of the Constitution of Canada.") 4) The Crown of Great Britain and Ireland, referenced in the preamble to the Constitution Act, 1867, ceased to exist in 1922. And 5) if the preamble is taken to mean the Canadian provinces remain united under the Crown of the United Kingdom, then there is no separate Crown of Canada and the monarch can be advised with respect to Canadian matters by his British ministers. However, as such is clearly not the case, the references to Queen in the Constitution Act, 1867, cannot be taken to mean the monarch of the United Kingdom.

Warren J. Newman asserted that, "far from 'de-Canadianizing' the Crown, 'de-patriating' the Canadian constitution, or retreating from the implications of Canada's independence as a sovereign state, as some of its detractors have claimed, the Succession to the Throne Act, 2013, is a clear expression of that independence—the signifying of the solemn assent of a sovereign Canadian Parliament to changes agreed to and concurred in by the members of a 'free association' of states united by 'a common allegiance to the Crown.'"

== See also ==
- Canadian constitutional law
- Canadian federalism
