= Patrick J. Monahan =

Canadian judge

Patrick J. Monahan (born 10 June 1954) is a judge of the Court of Appeal for Ontario.

== Education ==
He received his LL.B. degree from Osgoode Hall Law School at York University, where he graduated as gold medalist, and an LL.M. degree from Harvard University.

== Career ==
Monahan's career spanned both private and public sectors, working with firm Davies Ward Phillips & Vineberg LLP and the Ministry of the Attorney General. He has written extensively on constitutional reform and public policy.

He served as senior policy advisor to former Ontario premier David Peterson as well as former Ontario attorney general Ian Scott during the Meech Lake Accord negotiations from 1987 to 1990.

From 2003 until July 2009, Monahan was the dean of Osgoode Hall Law School and from 2009 to 2012 he was Provost and Vice President Academic of York University.

He has appeared as legal counsel in major public law litigation at the Supreme Court of Canada as well as in lower courts. He was a frequent commentator on constitutional and public policy issues in the national media.

== Judgeships ==
On May 19, 2017, Monahan was appointed by the federal government of Canada as a judge of the Superior Court of Justice in Toronto.

On September 1st, 2022, he was appointed a Judge of the Court of Appeal for Ontario.

== Controversies ==
During his tenure as Dean of the Law School, he was criticised for violating academic freedom by putting significant pressure on academics who organized a conference exploring models of statehood in Israel/Palestine, including the one state model. A report published by the Canadian Association of University Teachers chronicled the events based on testimonies and emails, and demonstrated his extensive pressure on the organizers to reshape the conference in a manner that would be more acceptable to Israel supporters.
