= Jeff Dennis =

Canadian businessman

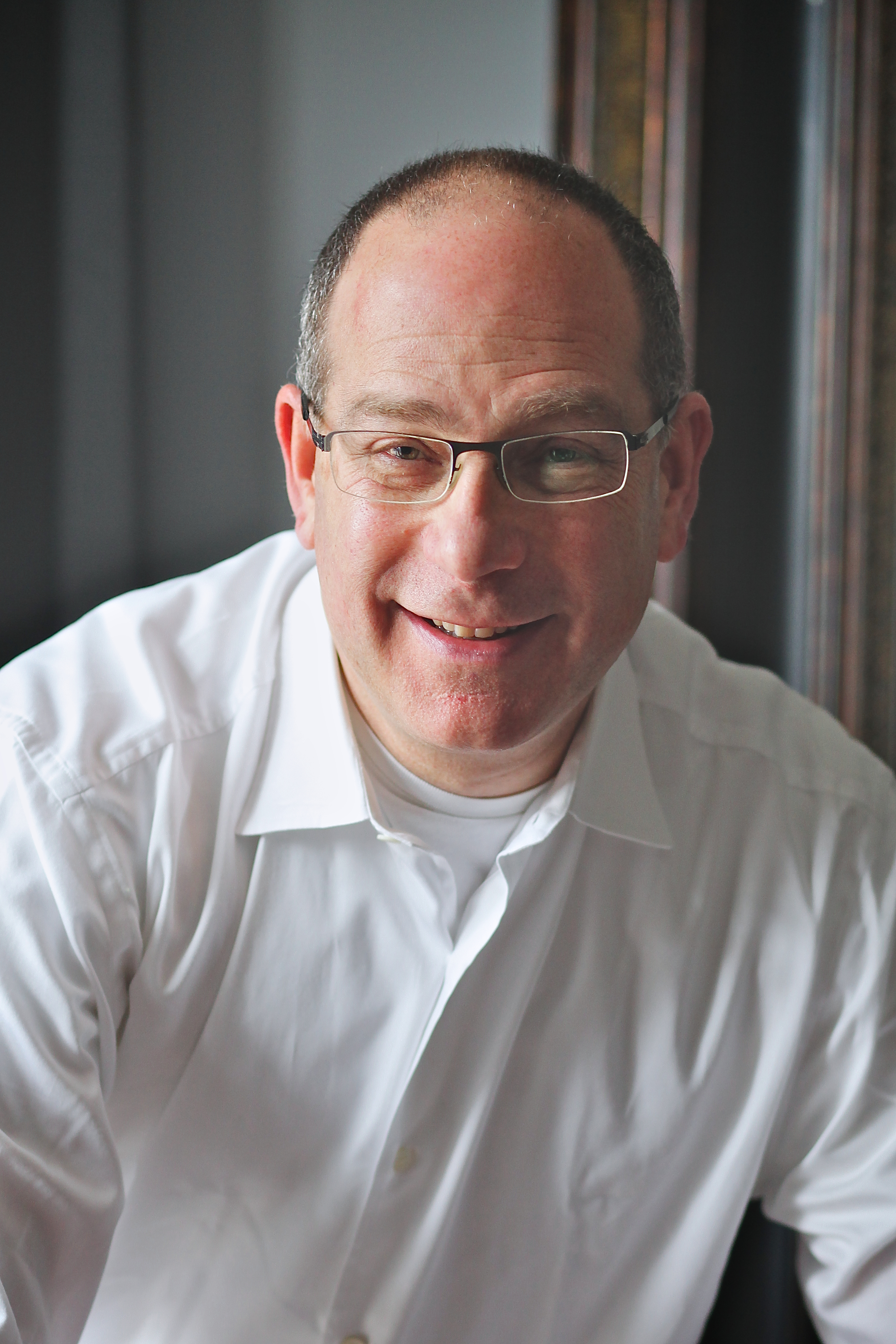
- Born: Jeffrey Dennis; June 3, 1958 (age 68); Toronto, Ontario, Canada
- Occupations: entrepreneur, author, public speaker, public company director and the co-founder, Entrepreneur in Residence at Fasken Martineau DuMoulin LLP
- Years active: 1958-Present
- Spouse: Lori Dennis (1983-Present)

Jeff Dennis (born June 3, 1958) is a Canadian serial entrepreneur, best-selling author, public speaker, and public company director. He is currently the Entrepreneur in Residence at Fasken Martineau DuMoulin LLP, a Toronto, Ontario-based international law firm.

== Biography ==
=== Early years ===
Jeff Dennis was born in Toronto, Ontario, Canada on June 3, 1958. Dennis was educated at Upper Canada College (Class of 1976), Brown University (Class of 1980) and University of Western Ontario (Faculty of Law Class of 1983). During his four years at Brown University in Providence, Rhode Island, Dennis completed a Bachelor of Arts degree in economics. After graduating with a Bachelor of Law Degree from the University of Western Ontario, he was called to the Bar in the Province of Ontario in 1985.

=== Legal Background ===
From 1983 to 1987, Dennis completed his articles and was an associate lawyer with Weir & Foulds, now WeirFoulds LLP, with a focus on real estate development, litigation and dispute resolution. In 1987, Dennis joined Blake, Cassels & Graydon, which is one of Canada's leading law firms, where he worked in their real estate department.

=== Entrepreneurial Life ===
==== Ashton-Royce Capital Corporation ====
In 1987 Dennis left the practice of law and started his first business venture, Ashton-Royce Capital Corporation, with 3 partners. Ashton-Royce started out as a real estate syndication company focusing on commercial, industrial and retail investment properties in the Greater Toronto Area. It eventually diversified into financing Canadian film and television productions, a management buyout of a film and television completion guarantor and various computer software and hardware companies.

==== Flagship Capital Partners Inc. ====
In 1998, after two of the Ashton-Royce partners exited the business, Ashton-Royce was wound up. Dennis and his remaining partner began carrying on business under their new entity, Flagship Capital Partners Inc. At the same time, Dennis incorporated Cale Financial Corporation as a limited market dealer registered with the Ontario Securities Commission.

Flagship Capital Partners Inc. continued to finance Canadian film and television productions and further diversified by investing in the cosmetics business and the investment management business.

==== Cale Financial Corporation ====
In 2006, Dennis sold his interest in Flagship Capital Partners Inc. and spun Cale Financial Corporation out on its own. Through Cale Financial Corporation, Dennis provided strategic advice and financing to entrepreneurs and the CEOs of fast growth businesses. Dennis shared his expertise in start-ups, operations, acquisitions and financings.

Dennis's clients have included:

- Achievers (formerly I Love Rewards Inc.), #12 on the 2007 Profit 100
- Healthscreen Solutions Incorporated, #1 on the 2007 Profit Hot 50
- Auctionwire Inc., #7 on the 2007 Profit Hot 50
- Prollenium Medical Technologies Inc., #36 on the 2006 Profit Hot 50
- SonnenEnergy Corp. (TSXV:PWR)
- Lang Bau Aus-und Isolierbau GmbH

In 2006, Dennis co-founded the Eminence Capital Group, serial founders of Capital Pool Companies under the TSX Venture Exchange's Capital Pool Companies Program.

==== Oneworld Solar Corp. (formerly COU Solar Inc.) ====
In 2009, Dennis co-founded Oneworld Solar Corp. (formerly COU Solar Inc.), an Ontario-based full service photovoltaic solar integrator with operations in North America and Europe. Oneworld Solar developed roof top and ground mounted PV solar installations. In late 2009, Oneworld Solar was sold to Oneworld Energy Inc., a diversified international renewable energy company.

==== Accredited Director (ICD.D) ====
In 2008, Dennis completed the Director's Education Program of the Institute of Corporate Directors and the Rotman School of Business at the University of Toronto and received his ICD.D certification as a corporate director.

==== Fasken Martineau DuMoulin LLP ====
In 2012, Jeff Dennis became the world's only entrepreneur in residence in a law firm when he joined Fasken Martineau DuMoulin LLP in that capacity. His role involves continuing to be a business advisor and mentor to early stage, high growth companies. Dennis is also an intrapreneur building a business model in one of Canada's largest law firms. An example is Fasken Martineau's Start-up Program, a starter kit for entrepreneurs that includes mentoring from Dennis on a monthly basis during their 12-month term of the program.

== Writing ==
=== Lessons from the Edge ===
In 2003, Dennis, along with co-author Jana Matthews, wrote Lessons from the Edge: Survival Skills for Starting and Growing a Company (Oxford University Press). Lessons from the Edge is a compilation of stories by entrepreneurs of their worst mistakes in business and the lessons that they learned from them.

=== Profit Magazine ===
Between 2004 and 2008, Dennis was Profit Magazine’s "Entrepreneur in Residence" and as such he contributed a regular column to the magazine on topics of interest to entrepreneurs.

=== Fasken Startup Blog ===
In 2013, Fasken Martineau DuMoulin LLP Launched its Fasken Startup Blog. Dennis is a regular contributor to the blog.

== Speaking engagements ==
Dennis has traveled the world speaking to entrepreneurs and business students since the publication of Lessons from the Edge in 2003. His stops have included Nepal, India, Thailand as well as most major cities in North America. Dennis's most popular presentations are the "Lessons from the Edge", "The Perfect Pitch", "The Canadian Financial Landscape for Startups" and "Partnerships: A Necessary Evil?".

== Community service ==
=== Entrepreneurs’ Organization ===
In 1991, Dennis co-founded the Toronto Chapter of the Young Entrepreneurs Organization, now called the [www.eonetwork.org Entrepreneurs Organization]. He has served in many leadership capacities at both the local and international level of Entrepreneurs Organization, including Toronto Chapter President and Director, Governance of the Entrepreneurs Organization International Board of Directors. In 1998, Dennis co-chaired the annual Entrepreneurs Organization convention which was held in Toronto.

Through his association with Entrepreneurs Organization and the Ewing Marion Kauffman Foundation, where he served on the entrepreneur's advisory board from 1998 to 2000, Dennis created a series of "Lessons from the Edge" seminars. At these seminars, entrepreneurs would share their worst mistakes in business and the lessons that they learned with their peers. His best-selling book Lessons from the Edge: Survival Skills for Starting and Growing a Company was inspired by the success of these seminars.

=== Mentor ===
In 2014, Jeff Dennis was named Runner up for the Starters Canada Ontario Mentor of the Year reflecting his commitment to the startup ecosystem in the Greater Toronto Area. Dennis has been a volunteer, lecturer, advisor and mentor to early stage entrepreneurs through MaRs, Highline InCubes, The Ladies Entrepreneur Organization, the Women's Presidents Organization and the Entrepreneurs Organization to name a few.

=== Youth Sports ===
A jock in his youth, playing competitive hockey and football, Dennis has given back to the community through coaching and convening youth hockey and soccer, through the Forest Hill Hockey Association and the North Toronto Soccer Club, respectively.

In 2006, Dennis coached an Under 16 Girls soccer team representing Toronto at the JCC Maccabi Games in Richmond, Virginia. The JCC Maccabi Games are the "junior Jewish Olympic Games" .
