= Proclamation of accession of George VI =

Formalities when George VI became king

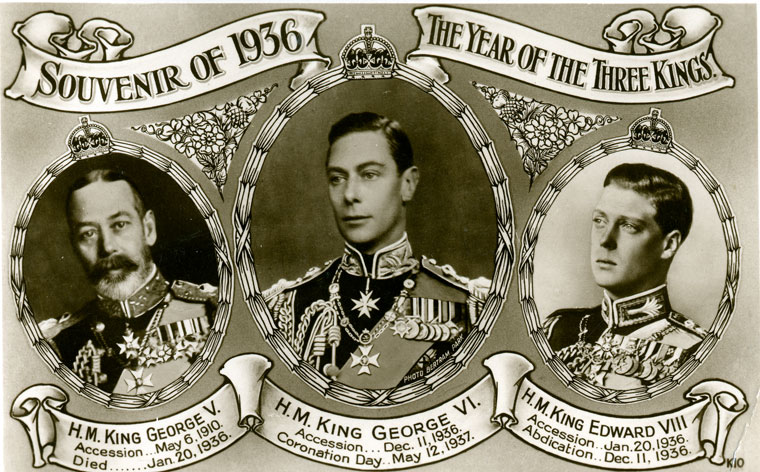
The Year of the Three Kings

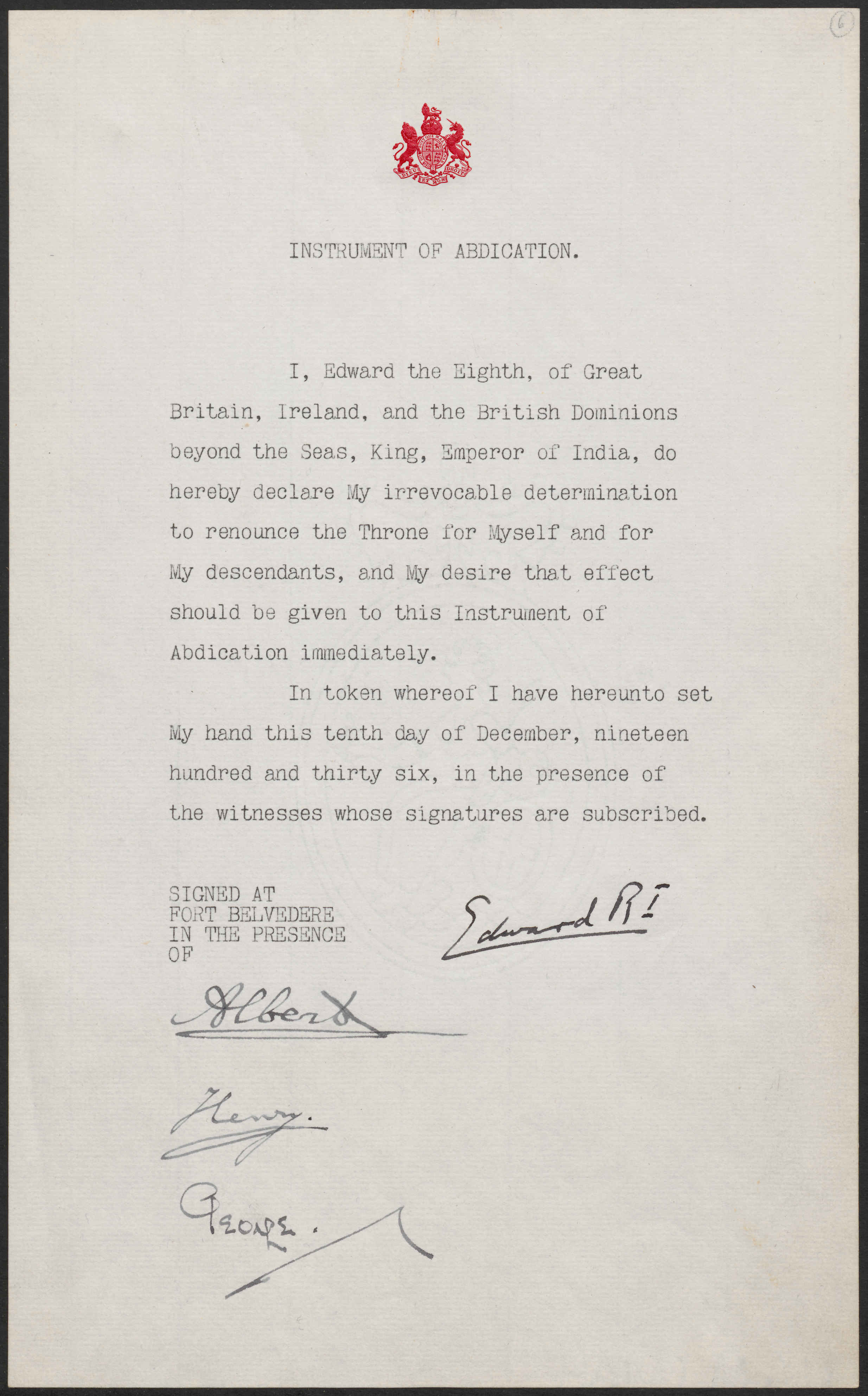
Instrument of abdication signed by Edward VIII and his three brothers, Albert, Henry and George, 10 December 1936

On 12 December 1936, George VI was proclaimed king throughout the British Empire after the abdication of his brother Edward VIII following a constitutional crisis as result of the King's desire to marry twice-divorced American socialite Wallis Simpson.

== Proclamation ==
At Fort Belvedere, on 10 December, Edward signed his written abdication notices, witnessed by his three younger brothers: Prince Albert, Duke of York (who succeeded Edward as King); Prince Henry, Duke of Gloucester; and Prince George, Duke of Kent. The following day, it was given effect by Act of Parliament: His Majesty's Declaration of Abdication Act 1936.

The following day, now being addressed as "Prince Edward", the former King gave a speech on BBC Radio explaining his reasons for abdicating, ending his speech with: "And now, we all have a new King. I wish him and you, his people, happiness and prosperity with all my heart. God bless you all. God save the King!"

On December 12, the Accession Council met at St James's Palace to proclaim Prince Albert as King George:

Whereas by an Instrument of Abdication dated the Tenth day of December instant His former Majesty King Edward the Eighth did declare His irrevocable Determination to renounce the Throne for Himself and His Descendants, and the said Instrument of Abdication has now taken effect, whereby the Imperial Crown of Great Britain, Ireland, and all other His former Majesty's dominions is now solely and rightfully come to the High and Mighty Prince Albert Frederick Arthur George:

We, therefore, the Lords Spiritual and Temporal of this Realm, being here assisted with these of His former Majesty's Privy Council, with numbers of other Principal Gentlemen of Quality, with the Lord-Mayor, Aldermen, and citizens of London, do now hereby, with one Voice and Consent of Tongue and Heart, publish and proclaim, That the High and Mighty Prince Albert Frederick Arthur George, is now become our only lawful and rightful Liege Lord George the Sixth by the Grace of God, of Great Britain, Ireland, and the British Dominions beyond the Seas King, Defender of the Faith, Emperor of India: To whom we do acknowledge all Faith and constant Obedience, with all hearty and humble Affection: beseeching God, by whom Kings and Queens do reign, to bless the Royal Prince George the Sixth, with long and happy years to reign over Us.

Given at St. James's Palace, this Twelfth day of December in the year of our Lord One thousand nine hundred and thirty-six.

GOD SAVE THE KING!

=== Outside the United Kingdom ===
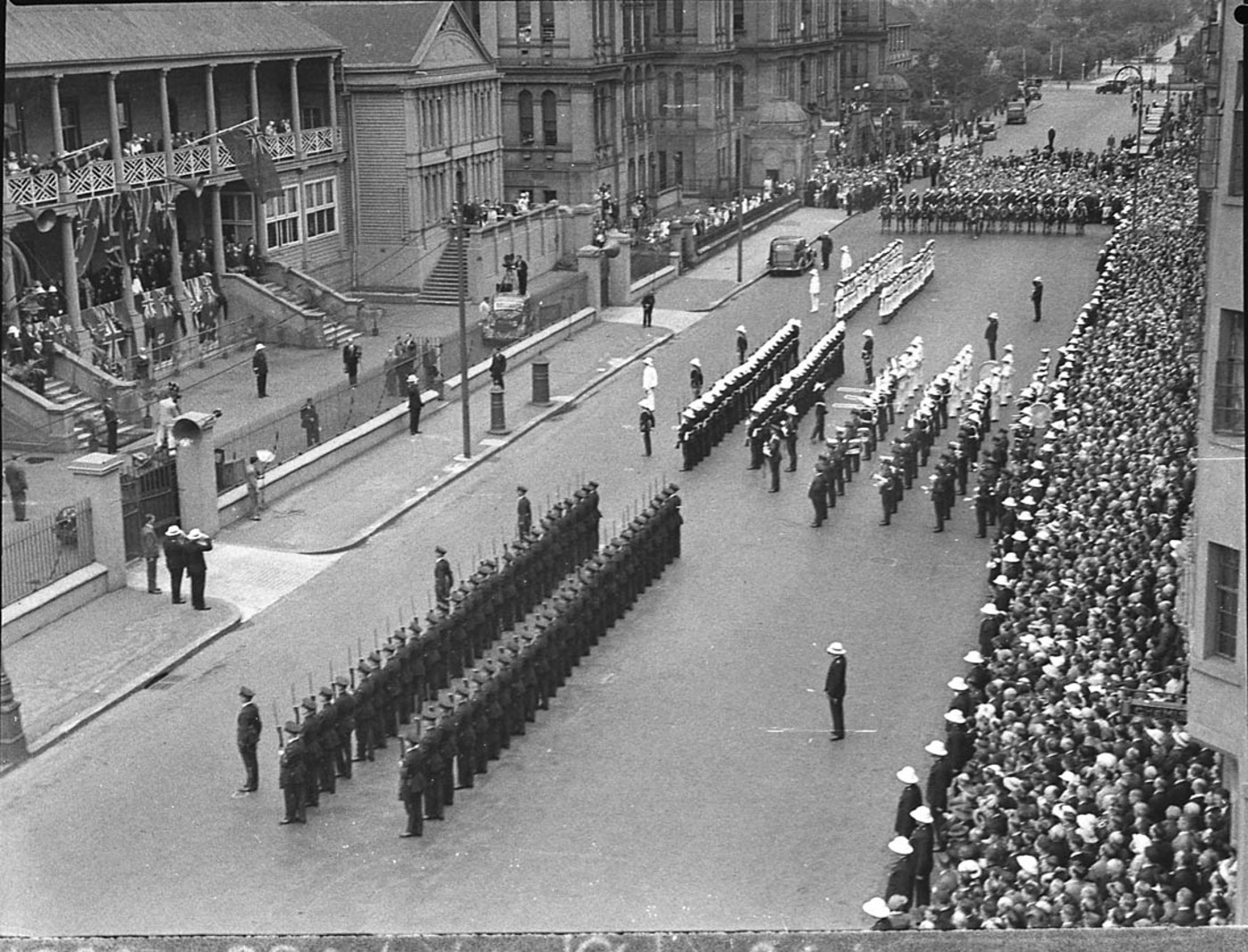
Proclamation of the accession of George VI outside Parliament House in Sydney, Australia

As the Statute of Westminster 1931 stipulated that the line of succession must remain the same throughout the Crown's realms, the governments of some of the British Dominions—Canada, Australia, the Union of South Africa, and New Zealand—requested and gave their permission for the act to become part of the law of their respective realms.

The Canadian parliament later passed the Succession to the Throne Act, 1937 to ratify changes to the rules of succession in Canada and ensure consistency with the changes in the rules then in place in the United Kingdom. South Africa passed His Majesty King Edward the Eighth's Abdication Act, 1937, which declared the abdication to have taken effect on 10 December 1936. In the Irish Free State, which had been independent from the United Kingdom as a dominion since December 1922, and in which the monarch still had some diplomatic functions, the Oireachtas (parliament) passed the Executive Authority (External Relations) Act 1936, recognising George VI as king from 12 December 1936. On the other side, Australia and New Zealand did not pass their own legislation.

Following the proclamation in the United Kingdom, similar proclamations took place across the realms of the Crown over a number of days.

== See also ==
- Coronation of George VI and Elizabeth
- Death and state funeral of George VI
