= Succession to the Throne Act =

Succession to the Throne Act may refer to

- Succession to the Throne Act, 1937, a 1937 act of the Parliament of Canada
- Succession to the Throne Act, 2013, a 2013 act of the Parliament of Canada
