= The Great Abdication =

The Great Abdication could refer to:

- The 1936 abdication of Edward VIII of the United Kingdom, where he ultimately relinquished the throne to wed American divorcée, Wallis Simpson.
- According to the eschatology of some branches of Christianity, it is the event where Jesus will relinquish his rule to God the Father.
