= Robert Turner (British Army soldier) =

British army soldier (1820–1910)

Robert Turner DCM MSM
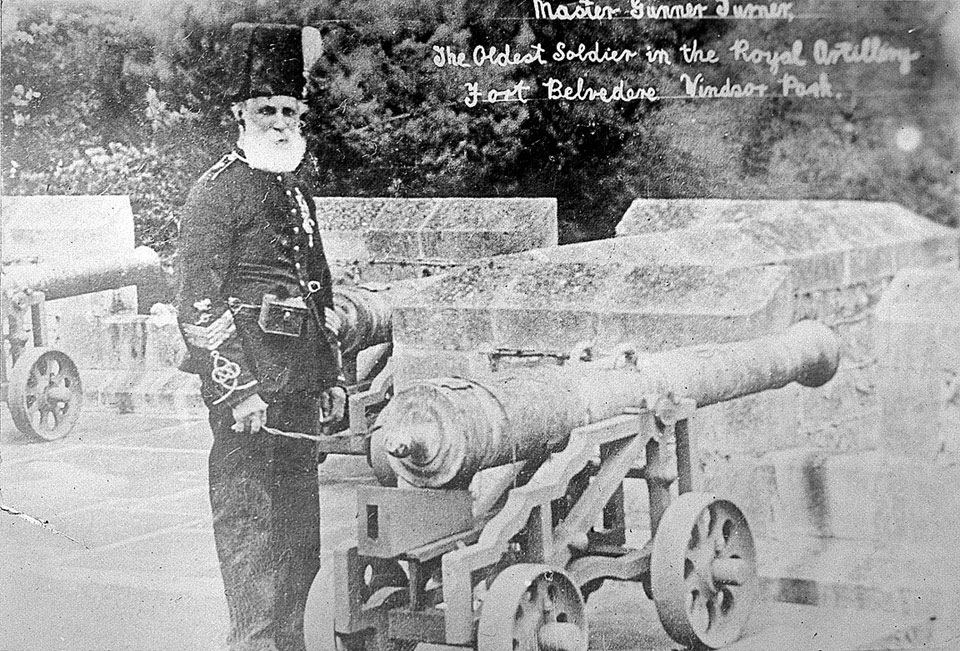
- Turner and gun at Fort Belvedere, c. 1880
- Born: 11 October 1820; Hemingstone, Suffolk
- Died: 24 June 1910 (aged 89); Fort Belvedere, Surrey
- Military career
- Allegiance: United Kingdom
- Branch: British Army
- Service years: 1840–1910
- Rank: Acting Master Gunner
- Unit: Royal Artillery
- Conflicts: Crimean War; Battle of the Alma; Siege of Sevastopol; Battle of Inkerman
- Awards: Distinguished Conduct Medal

Robert Turner (11 October 1820 – 24 June 1910) was a British Army soldier of the Regiment of Royal Artillery. He joined the artillery in 1840 and served with them in the aftermath of the 1848 Young Ireland rebellion and on garrison duty in Jamaica. Turner saw action in the Crimean War at the Battle of the Alma, Siege of Sevastopol and the Battle of Inkerman. During the latter he assisted with the distribution of ammunition after the soldier allocated to this was killed, and was awarded the Distinguished Conduct Medal.

In 1867, he was appointed as bombardier at Fort Belvedere in Windsor Great Park. His responsibilities included firing salutes from cannon on royal birthdays. He was visited at the fort by Queen Victoria and by 1880 achieved some fame as "the oldest soldier in the Royal Artillery". He remained at the post under Victoria's successor Edward VII and served until his death.

== Early life and career ==
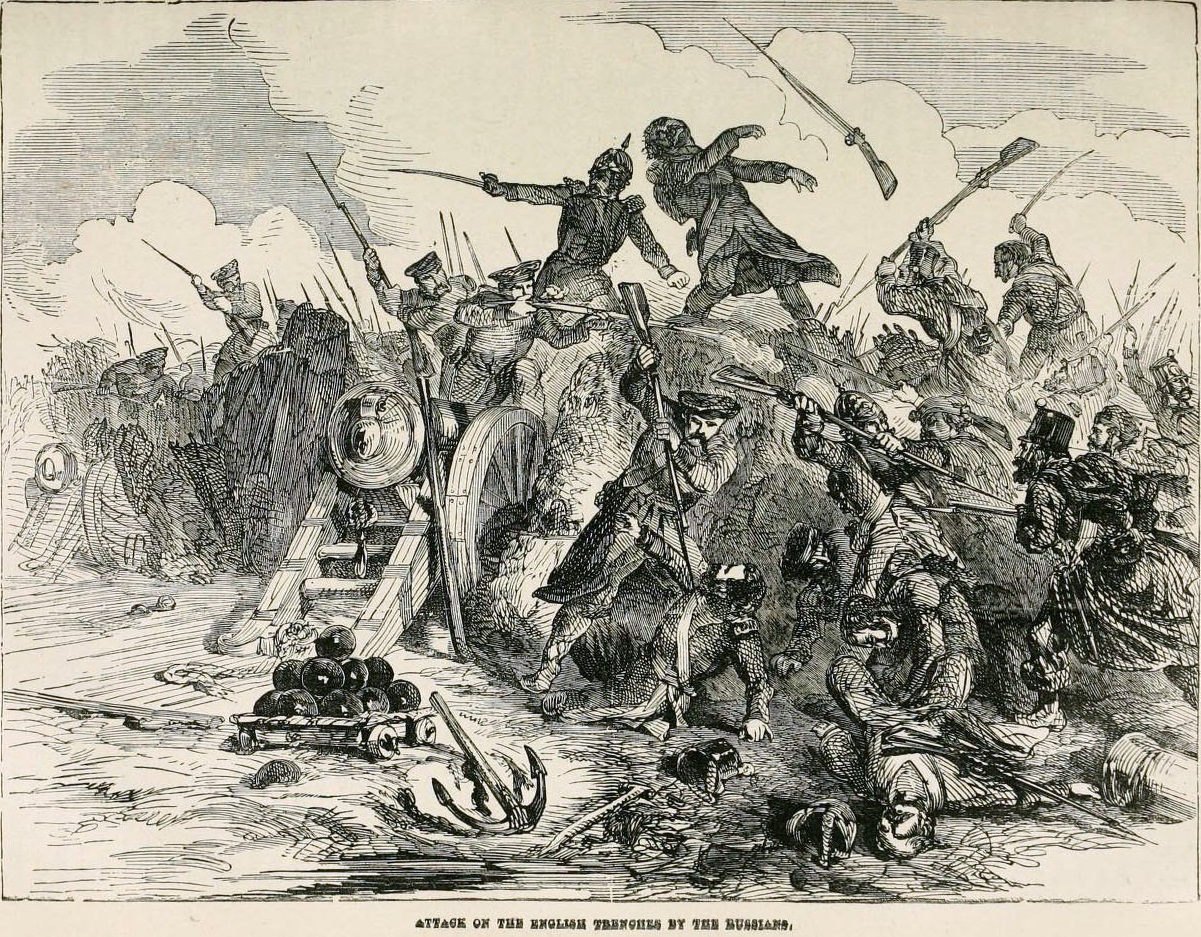
Russian troops attack a British artillery position at Inkerman

Turner was born at Hemingstone, Suffolk, on 11 October 1820. He enlisted with the Royal Artillery and was drafted into the regiment at the Royal Arsenal, Woolwich on 25 November 1840. Turner was stationed at Woolwich until the 1848 Young Ireland rebellion when his unit was sent to reinforce British forces in Ireland. After the suppression of the rebellion he accompanied his regiment on a five-year posting to Port Royal in the Colony of Jamaica. In June 1851 he was tried by court martial for an offence, found guilty and sentenced to three days' imprisonment and reduction in rank from corporal to driver. After Jamaica Turner returned briefly to Ireland before, in 1854, Britain declared war on the Russian Empire and entered the Crimean War.

Turner fought in the 20 September 1854 Battle of the Alma, the lengthy Siege of Sevastopol and the 5 November Battle of Inkerman. While serving as a driver, mounted on a limber horse, he noted that the soldier distributing ammunition had been killed. Turner picked up the fallen man's ammunition box and continued his work. The box was struck many times by bullets but Turner was unharmed. For this action he received the Distinguished Conduct Medal and a £5 gratuity. For his Crimea service he received the Crimea Medal with clasps for Alma, Inkerman and Sevastopol and the Turkish Crimea Medal. In later life he said of his Crimean experience: "I don't remember a great deal about it now; it's so long ago, isn't it? But I haven't forgotten Inkerman – we were in a pretty tight corner there, I must say." After the war he was garrisoned in London.

== Fort Belvedere ==
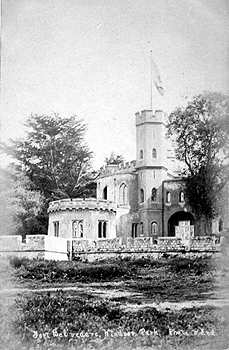
Fort Belvedere in the early 1900s

In 1867, Turner was appointed as bombardier at Fort Belvedere in Windsor Great Park, receiving the post in recognition for his distinguished service. He was formally discharged from the army but continued to be a member of the Regiment of Royal Artillery, retaining his rank of acting master-gunner and continued to receive new issues of uniform. His duties included firing salutes from the fort's guns, mostly obsolete cannon captured in battle, at noon on royal birthdays. He was eventually forbidden to fire the weapons on safety grounds but continued to carry out the drill, pretending to fire the cannons.

Turner was tall and well-built with white hair and beard and by around 1880 he was appearing on postcards, billed as "the oldest soldier in the Royal Artillery". In the late 19th century Queen Victoria often visited the fort on summer afternoon carriage drives to take tea and converse with Turner. Turner received the Army Long Service and Good Conduct Medal and, in 1897, the Queen Victoria Diamond Jubilee Medal. When Victoria was succeeded by Edward VII Turner received a King Edward VII Coronation Medal. Edward also called at the fort to enquire of Turner's health. In 1906 Turner was awarded a Meritorious Service Medal and a supplement of £10 to his pension.

Turner's wife died around January 1909. He was too weak to attend her funeral, but put on his uniform and stood at salute in the fort's courtyard as her coffin was carried out. Later that year the Windsor and Eton Express said Turner had "a very substantial claim to the title of being the oldest soldier [in the British Army]". He died at the fort on 24 June 1910. His funeral was held at the church in Sunningdale and was attended by hundreds of people, including British Army officers and a fellow Crimean War veteran. Turner's coffin was draped with the Union Flag atop which was placed his service shako. The coffin sat on a gun carriage drawn by five horses and was escorted by a mounted detachment of the 2nd Dragoon Guards (Queen's Bays). Turner's tunic, dating from circa 1890, and medals are in the collection of the National Army Museum.
