= Fort Belvedere, Surrey =

Grade II* listed country house in Surrey, England

Fort Belvedere
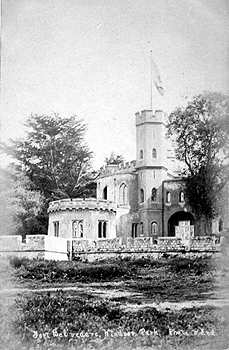
- Postcard of Fort Belvedere in the early 1900s.

- Location within Surrey
- 51°24′16″N 0°36′44″W
- Location: Windsor Great Park, Surrey, England

History
- Built: 1750–55, 1828

Site notes
- Architect: Henry Flitcroft Jeffry Wyatville
- Architectural style: Gothic Revival
- Governing body: Leasehold privately held by the Weston family, freehold owned by the Crown Estate

Listed Building – Grade II*
- Official name: Fort Belvedere
- Designated: 17 November 1986
- Reference no.: 1294245

Fort Belvedere (originally Shrubs Hill Tower) is a Grade II* listed country house on Shrubs Hill in Windsor Great Park, in Surrey, England. The fort was built as a folly by Henry Flitcroft in 1750–1755, and was later predominantly re-constructed by Jeffry Wyatville in a Gothic Revival style in the 1820s.

The fort was occupied by numerous members of the British royal family and associated personages from 1750 to 1976. From 1929, Fort Belvedere was the home of Edward, Prince of Wales, who greatly renovated the house and grounds, and it was where, after a constitutional crisis, and as Edward VIII, he signed his Instrument of Abdication in December 1936. The property remains part of the Crown Estate, is home to private tenants and is not open to the public.

== Location ==
The Fort Belvedere estate is situated in the extreme south end of Windsor Great Park in the parish of Egham, in the Borough of Runnymede in Surrey. The closest town to the fort is Sunningdale in Berkshire. The fort is situated on Shrub's Hill and overlooks Virginia Water. The fort is 22 miles (35 km) from London, and Edward, Prince of Wales, would boast of being able to see London's St Paul's Cathedral "through a spy-glass" from the fort in the 1930s.

The fort's acquired name of 'Belvedere' (from Italian: 'beautiful view') reflects its status as a vantage point and as an 'eye-catcher' for the park.

== Early history ==
It was, at first, merely a folly. It was used as a summer-house, and seven counties could be seen, as now, from the top of the flagstaff tower. The triangular turreted structure was set amid a dense plantation of trees and overlooked Virginia Water, a man-made body of water constructed by Henry Flitcroft and his assistant Thomas Sandby at the behest of the Duke.

Sir Jeffrey Wyatville, who was responsible, under George IV, for the rebuilding of Windsor Castle, enlarged the house in 1828 at a proposed cost of £4000. Additions included an octagonal dining room in the north-east side, in which the King regularly had dinner. A three-storey annex was added for the accommodation of the Bombardier, with a new wall linking a heightened turret to which a large flagpole was added. The addition of further Gothic details enhanced the interior and exterior of the fort in 1829. The fort is built of brick with an applied wash that imitated the appearance of stone. Queen Victoria used Fort Belvedere as a tea house, and the fort was opened to the public in the 1860s.

By 1910, the fort was occupied as a grace and favour residence by Sir Malcolm Murray, the Comptroller to Prince Arthur, Duke of Connaught and Strathearn. The Duke was the owner of nearby Bagshot Park. The fort was extended with a new service wing and entrance porch in 1911–12, which was subsequently demolished. The dining and drawing rooms were also extended and new entrance lodges were built. After the departure of Murray, the fort was described as suffering from "dust inches deep, splintered doors and sagging floors" in 1929.

The ruins in the grounds can be seen from the shore of Virginia Water and are part of an ancient temple brought from Leptis Magna near Tripoli. The ruins are located between the south shore and Blacknest Road close to the junction with the A30 London Road and Wentworth Drive.

== Edward VIII ==
In 1929, the building became vacant, and was given to Prince Edward, Prince of Wales, by his father, George V. The King had originally expressed surprise at Edward's request asking him "What could you possibly want that queer old place for? Those damn weekends I suppose", but then smiled and gave his permission. Edward's previous residence had been York House, part of St. James's Palace in London, which he had thought "more an office than a home." He would later write that he "created a home at the fort just as my father and grandfather had created one at Sandringham ... here I spent some of the happiest days of my life."

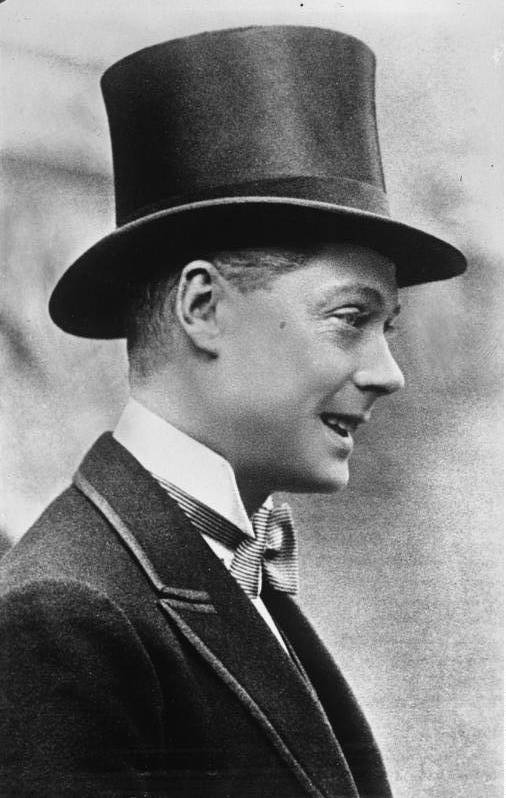
Edward in 1932 during his occupancy and renovation of Fort Belvedere

During Edward's occupancy, extensive renovation of the interior and grounds was carried out.

I came to love the Fort as I loved no other material thing – perhaps because it was so much my own creation. – Prince Edward, Duke of Windsor

He built a swimming pool at the fort between 1931 and 1932, that replaced an old lily pond, and added a tennis court and developed stables in the grounds of the fort. Edward added modern conveniences at the fort, many of which were still rare in British homes, including bathrooms adjacent to nearly every room, a steam-room, showers, built-in cupboards and central heating. The prince initially renovated the house with the assistance of his then mistress Freda Dudley Ward. By 1959, only one room, the drawing room, had survived from Edward's renovations. The drawing room's painted walls were designed to resemble the pinewood panelling of a Scottish shooting lodge. The total cost of the redecoration including plumbing and repairs came to £21,000 (£1.27 million as of 2025).

The relationship between Edward and Wallis Simpson blossomed at Fort Belvedere; the couple spent their first weekend at the fort at the end of January 1932, and by early 1935 two rooms had been combined at the fort for her use. Notable interior decorators to work on the fort under Edward included Sybil Colefax, Lady Mendl, Maison Jansen, and Herman Schrijver. Edward and Wallis entertained most weekends at the house; guests present included 'courtiers and diplomats, American men of affairs and English Society, garnished with a sprinkling of statesmen, soldiers and sailors'. Giles Gilbert Scott added a guest wing to the fort after Edward's accession as king in 1936. In 1936 Wallis moved permanently to the fort after receiving threatening anonymous letters, and left Fort Belvedere for the final time on 3 December 1936.

Cabinet Office files released in 2013 revealed that during December 1936, the Home Secretary, Sir John Simon, had ordered the General Post Office to intercept Edward's telephone communications between the fort and the European continent. Government officials were caused further alarm by Edward's habit of leaving his official "red boxes" unguarded around the fort.

Following opposition to the potential of Edward's marriage to Wallis Simpson from the British government and autonomous Dominions of the British Commonwealth, the fort became the final setting of Edward's abdication as king. He held several meetings with Prime Minister Stanley Baldwin at Fort Belvedere during the crisis, and on 10 December 1936, signed his written abdication notices at the fort, witnessed by his three younger brothers: Prince Albert, Duke of York (who succeeded Edward as George VI); Prince Henry, Duke of Gloucester; and Prince George, Duke of Kent. The following day, it was given legislative form by special Act of Parliament: His Majesty's Declaration of Abdication Act 1936. Following his abdication at the fort, Edward described himself as feeling "like a swimmer surfacing from a great depth ... I left the room and stepped outside, inhaling the fresh morning air." He retained the visitor's book from the fort, and it would be used at all the subsequent homes he and Wallis Simpson would share.

Edward continued to pay for the gardeners, insurance and upkeep of the fort in the initial years following his abdication, because it was his wish that he would return there. His possessions from the fort were transferred to the Château de la Croë in the south of France (where he had named the sitting room "The Belvedere") in the spring of 1938, but many were damaged in transit. Edward was informed in March 1940 that the fort was no longer in his possession as his warrant to occupy the grace and favour residence had expired on the termination of his reign and was not to be renewed by the present sovereign, his brother, now George VI. Edward was greatly upset by this, writing in 1940 that "It is crystal clear that this proposed reserving of the Fort by the use of Crown Lands is nothing more than a piece of bluff, and the first excuse that the king has been able to find to deprive me of my right to occupy the place should I ever desire to do so ..." Edward believed that the incident was an example of his 'brother's failure to keep his word to me' after the fort had apparently been reserved for him if he should reside once more in England.

In 1977 the fort was used extensively for the filming of Edward & Mrs. Simpson, an ITV serialisation of Edward and Wallis's relationship.

== Post abdication ==
Fort Belvedere was largely unoccupied during the 20 years following Edward's abdication. The fort was used by the Office of the Commissioners of Crown Lands, who had been evacuated from their central London offices during World War II. After the war, the house remained empty.

=== Gerald and Angela Lascelles ===
In 1953 it was announced that the fort was to be available on a long lease, and a 99-year lease on the fort was bought by The Honourable Gerald Lascelles in 1955. Lascelles was the son of Henry Lascelles, 6th Earl of Harewood and Mary, Princess Royal, the only daughter of George V and Mary of Teck. Lascelles was a first cousin of Queen Elizabeth II. He lived at the fort with his wife, Angela, and their son, Henry. Lascelles described the house as 'falling to pieces' at the beginning of his occupancy, and refurbished the fort, removing most traces of Edward's renovations in the process, except for the swimming pool and the battlements walk. The 30–40 rooms of the fort were reduced by the Lascelleses to the "equivalent of an eight-bedroom house, including quarters for three or four staff. It will be a very manageable home". Angela Lascelles remained dedicated to improving and renovating the house and maintaining the estate. The Lascelleses' restoration of the fort was undertaken by the designer Stanley Peters who took three years to return it to its 18th-century state; Peters faced difficulties in removing offices added when Edward became king. A mural added by Peters in the drawing-room, and painted by Oliver Carson, depicted Peters in an incidental role, portrayed in 18th-century clothes chasing butterflies. The Lascelleses later claimed the credit for Peters's designs and his career suffered irreparable damage as a result.

=== 1976 sale of the lease ===
The financial pressure following his divorce caused Gerald Lascelles to put his 78-year remainder of the lease up for sale through estate agents Savills in 1976. Offers for the lease above £200,000 were invited. An advertisement for Fort Belvedere's lease listed the features of the fort as "Hexagonal central hall, fine drawing room, dining room, library, compact domestic quarters, 6 bedrooms, 5 bathrooms, arranged mainly in suites" and the expanse of the estate as "about 59 acres, of which 25 acres is freehold woodland". Three cottages were also included in the lease with the swimming pool and tennis court. The lease was eventually acquired by a son of the Emir of Dubai in 1976.

=== Galen and Hilary Weston ===
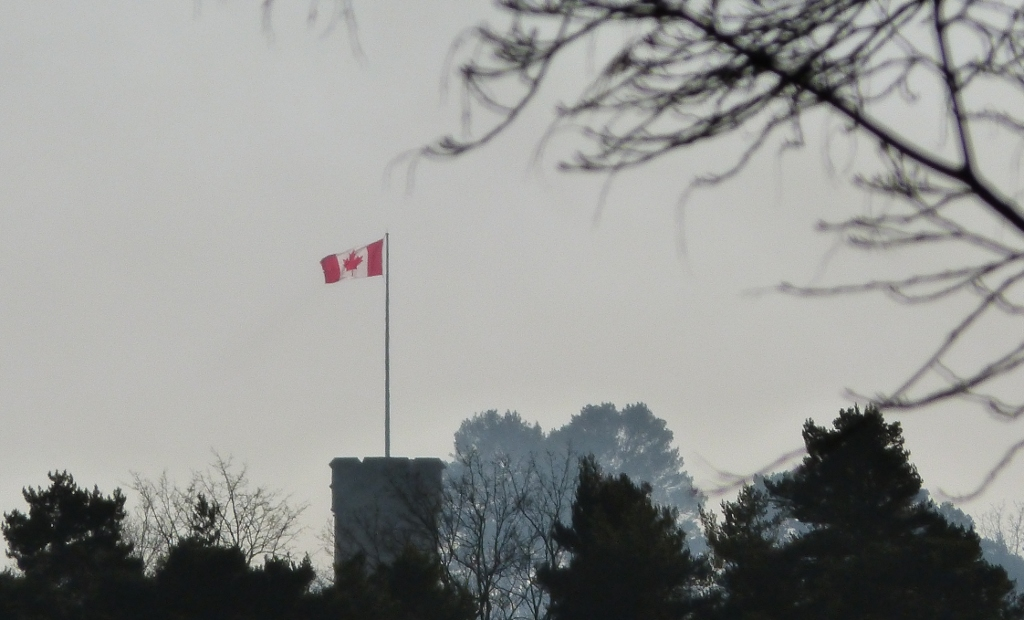
Fort Belvedere's tower flying the Canadian flag in January 2014.

From the early 1980s, the lease on Fort Belvedere has been held by the Canadian billionaire retail magnate Galen Weston and his wife, Hilary. It continues to be occupied by his family. The Westons carried out extensive works on the fort, constructing a polo stud and doubling the size of the lake in the grounds. Galen Weston died in 2021 and Hilary Weston died in 2025.

The Westons had a close relationship with the British royal family; they were often guests of Queen Elizabeth The Queen Mother at the nearby Royal Lodge, and hosted Queen Elizabeth II at the fort. King Charles III played polo with Galen Weston and stables his polo ponies at Fort Belvedere, and the nearby Coworth Park Polo Club in Sunningdale is the base for Weston's polo team, the Maple Leafs.

The Crown Estate retains ownership of the freehold, as the property is still part of the Great Park.

== Gardens ==
The grounds of Fort Belvedere are about a hundred acres in size and include forests and a lake. The gardens of Fort Belvedere, Virginia Water and the nearby Clockcase are Grade I listed on the Register of Historic Parks and Gardens.

Edward said of the fort that "By the time I came upon it, it had become a pseudo-Gothic hodge-podge. A profusion of yew trees kept one side of the house in perpetual shadow, staining the wall with green acidulous mould. But the half-buried beauty of the place leaped to my eye."

Edward's subsequent passion for landscaping and horticulture briefly eclipsed golf and hunting in his affections, and he would often get his weekend guests, including his brother Bertie, the future George VI, to assist him in the landscaping of the fort. The garden designer Norah Lindsay also worked on the fort's garden at the behest of Edward; he would later describe how her "unusual use of roses in the herbaceous border" had justified her payment. Edward planted roses and irises along the walls of the battlement. Prime Minister Baldwin complimented Edward on the beauty of the garden; commenting on the "silvery radiance of the birch trees and the delicacy of the autumn tints" in late 1936. Edward also mowed hay on the fort's estate in the summer months and built a rock garden with cascading water pumped from Virginia Water.

The Westons carried out substantial landscaping at the fort, and recruited Rosemary Verey to help with the design of the gardens at Fort Belvedere in the early 1980s. Verey's designs for the rose garden and the 120-foot-long borders along the battlement remain, and have been reworked and maintained by garden designer Tom Stuart-Smith.

== Cannon ==
Thirty-one brass cannon were moved to the north-facing crenelated terrace of the fort from nearby Cumberland Lodge in the early 19th century. The cannon were made by Andrew Schalch at the Royal Brass Foundry in Woolwich in 1729–1749. The cannon were fired for George IV's birthdays and other royal birthdays until 1907, with the cannon fire being answered by a miniature frigate situated on Virginia Water in the early years of their operation. The last Bombardier situated at the fort was Master Gunner Robert Turner of the Royal Artillery. The Bombardier was entrusted with the care of the guns and lived in Bombardier's Cottage, connected to the main house by an archway. The cannon would have been melted down as part of the war effort in 1943 had it not been for the intervention of the head of the Tower Armoury, J. G. Mann. Four guns were removed from the terrace in 1930 and placed in two pairs at the entrances to the fort.

== Derivative buildings ==
Shrubs Hill Tower inspired the building of similar triangular tower follies on various large estates, including:

- Haldon Belvedere, also known as Lawrence Tower (1788), Haldon House, near Exeter, Devon, built by Sir Robert Palk, 1st Baronet (1717–1798), in memory of his friend and patron General Stringer Lawrence (1697–1775).
- Powderham Belvedere (1773) at Powderham Castle, near Exeter, Devon, built by the Earl of Devon.

== Book sources ==
- Roberts, Jane (1997). Royal Landscape: The Gardens and Parks of Windsor. Yale University Press. ISBN 978-0-300-07079-8.
- Aslet, Clive (2013). An Exuberant Catalogue of Dreams: The Americans who Revived the Country House in Britain. Aurum Press. ISBN 978-1-78131-094-6.
- Cherry, Bridget; Pevsner, Nikolaus (1989). The Buildings of England: Devon (second ed.). Penguin Books. ISBN 0-14-071050-7.
