= Succession to the Throne Act, 1937 =

Canadian consent to Edward VIII abdication

Parliament of Canada
- Long title: An Act respecting alterations in the law touching the Succession to the Throne
- Enacted by: Parliament of Canada
- Royal assent: 31 March 1937
- Status: In force

The Succession to the Throne Act, 1937 (1 Geo. VI, c.16) is a 1937 act of the Canadian parliament that ratified the Canadian cabinet's consent to His Majesty's Declaration of Abdication Act 1936, an act of the United Kingdom parliament that allowed the abdication of Edward VIII. This ratification was of symbolic value only, because, under the Statute of Westminster 1931, the UK act was already part of Canadian law by virtue of the Canadian cabinet's prior request and consent.

== Background ==
Edward VIII abdicated in order to marry Wallis Simpson after facing opposition from the governments of the United Kingdom and the Dominions, including Canada's. Edward signed instruments of abdication on 10 December, mailing one instrument, with advance notice by cable, to each Dominion; Canada's went to the Governor General, John Buchan, 1st Baron Tweedsmuir. However, Edward was still king until royal assent was granted to His Majesty's Declaration of Abdication Act 1936, which was passed through the British Houses of Parliament on 11 December, with no amendments. Under the terms of the Statute of Westminster 1931, the British parliament could pass legislation for a Dominion only at the request and with the approval of that Dominion's government. The Canadian government duly requested and gave its consent, via an Order in Council of the Privy Council of Canada. Australia, South Africa, and New Zealand did likewise. Edward as King-in-Council then issued an Order in his British Privy Council to authorize the inclusion of the Dominions in the Abdication Act. The South African parliament later passed His Majesty King Edward the Eighth's Abdication Act, 1937, backdating George VI's accession in South Africa to 10 December 1936. The Irish Free State did not incorporate the UK act but recognized the abdication in the Executive Authority (External Relations) Act 1936.

== Canadian law ==
The Canadian act ratified the changes to the rules of succession in Canada and assured consistency with the changes in the rules then in place in the United Kingdom and the other Dominions. The Canadian act was not legally required at the time, as the Canadian government's request and consent to His Majesty's Declaration of Abdication Act 1936 had already made it part of Canada's law and the Governor General had already proclaimed the Duke of York as King George VI (indeed, royal assent to the Canadian bill was granted in the name of George VI.) However, constitutional experts noted that "Whether necessary or not, it was clearly designed to demonstrate Canada's equality with Britain in the British Commonwealth and to display the Canadian aspect of the monarchy." Under present Canadian law, the Canadian government cannot request and consent to any British act becoming part of Canadian law, under both the UK parliament's Canada Act, 1982 (which renounced the right in UK law), and Canadian parliament's Constitution Act, 1982 (which repealed the 1931 provision in Canada).

== See also ==
- List of acts of the Parliament of Canada
- Succession to the Throne Act, 2013
