= Statute of Westminster 1931 =

Act of the Parliament of the United Kingdom recognising autonomy of British Dominions

Statute of Westminster, 1931 (Note: Short title as conferred by section 12 of the act. When originally enacted, the title contained a comma, reading "Statute of Westminster, 1931". The comma was removed by an amendment to the act at a later date. Modern convention for citation of short titles in the UK is to omit the comma preceding the date. However, in Canada, the comma is retained, pursuant to the Constitution Act, 1982, s. 53.)
- Act of Parliament
- Parliament of the United Kingdom
- Long title: An Act to give effect to certain resolutions passed by Imperial Conferences held in the years 1926 and 1930.
- Citation: 22 & 23 Geo. 5. c. 4
- Introduced by: J. H. Thomas, Secretary of State for Dominion Affairs (Commons)
- Territorial extent: United Kingdom of Great Britain and Northern Ireland; Commonwealth of Australia; Dominion of Canada; Irish Free State; Dominion of Newfoundland; Dominion of New Zealand; Union of South Africa; (Note: Section 10.)

Dates
- Royal assent: 11 December 1931
- Commencement: 11 December 1931 (Note: The Acts of Parliament (Commencement) Act 1793.)
- Repealed: Republic of Ireland: 1949; South Africa: 1962
Other legislation
Amends	Colonial Laws Validity Act 1865
Amended by	British North America Act 1949; South Africa Act 1962; Interpretation Act 1978; Australia Act 1986; Merchant Shipping Act 1995
Repealed by	Republic of Ireland: Republic of Ireland Act 1949

Status: Amended

Records of Parliamentary debate relating to the statute from Hansard

Text of statute as originally enacted

Text of the Statute of Westminster 1931 as in force today (including any amendments) within the United Kingdom, from legislation.gov.uk.

The Statute of Westminster 1931 (22 & 23 Geo. 5. c. 4) is an act of the Parliament of the United Kingdom that significantly increased the autonomy of the Dominions of the British Commonwealth.

Passed on 11 December 1931, the statute increased the sovereignty of the self-governing Dominions of the British Empire from the United Kingdom. It also bound them all to seek each other's approval for changes to monarchical titles and the common line of succession. The statute was effective either immediately or upon ratification. It thus became a statutory embodiment of the principles of equality and common allegiance to the Crown set out in the Balfour Declaration of 1926. As the statute removed nearly all of the British parliament's authority to legislate for the Dominions, it was a crucial step in the development of the Dominions as separate, independent, and sovereign states.

Its modified versions are now domestic law in Australia and Canada (including Newfoundland and Labrador). It is no longer in effect in New Zealand, and has been implicitly repealed in former Dominions that are no longer Commonwealth realms.

== History ==
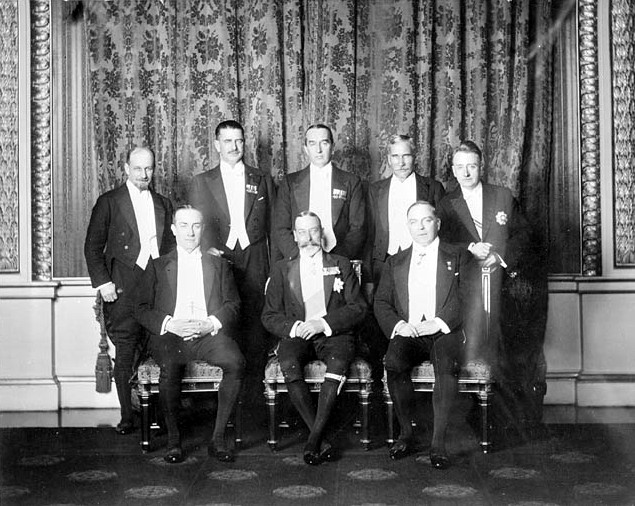
King George V at the 1926 Imperial Conference, surrounded by the U.K. prime minister and the prime ministers of the various dominions

England, and Britain after 1707, had colonies outside of Europe since the late 16th century. These early colonies were largely run by private companies rather than the Crown directly, but by the end of the century had (except for India) been subsumed under Crown control. Oversight of these colonies oscillated between relatively lax enforcement of laws and centralization of power depending on the politics of the day, but the Parliament in Westminster always remained supreme. Most colonies in North America broke away from British rule and became independent as the United States in the late 18th century, where after British attention turned towards Australia and Asia.

British policy with regards to the colonies began to be rationalized and streamlined in the 19th century. Responsible government, wherein colonial governments were held accountable to legislatures just as the British cabinet was responsible to the British Parliament, was granted to colonies beginning with Nova Scotia in 1848. Confusion existed as to what extent British legislation applied to the colonies; in South Australia, justice Benjamin Boothby caused a nuisance by striking down several local laws as contrary ("repugnant") to the legislation in Britain. Westminster rectified this situation by passing the Colonial Laws Validity Act 1865 (28 & 29 Vict. c. 63), which allowed the colonies to pass legislation different from that in Britain provided that it was not repugnant to any law expressly passed by the Imperial Parliament to extend to that colony. This had the dual effect of granting colonies autonomy within their borders while subordinating them to the British Parliament otherwise.

Most of the remaining colonies in North America – everything north of the United States with the exception of Newfoundland – were merged into a federal polity known as "Canada" in the late 1860s and early 1870s. Canada was termed a "dominion", a term previously used in slightly different contexts in English history, and granted a broad array of powers between the federal government and the provincial governments. Australia was similarly deemed a dominion when it federated in 1901, as were Newfoundland, New Zealand, South Africa, and the Irish Free State in the first decades of the 20th century.

Dominions did not possess full sovereignty on an equal footing with the United Kingdom. The parliament of Canada passed a law barring appeals from its Supreme Court to the imperial Judicial Committee of the Privy Council in 1888, but in 1925 a judgement of the Privy Council determined that this law was invalid. Combined with the King–Byng affair the following year, this bred resentment in Canada and led to its insistence on full sovereignty. The leadership of the Irish Free State, meanwhile, was dominated by those who had fought a war of independence against Britain and who had agreed to dominion status as a compromise; they took a maximalist view of the autonomy they had secured in the Anglo-Irish Treaty and pushed for recognition of their state's sovereignty, which would have implications for the other dominions as well. The 1926 Imperial Conference led to the Balfour declaration that dominions were equal in status to one another and to the United Kingdom. Further conferences in 1929 and 1930 worked out a substantive framework to implement this declaration. This became the Statute of Westminster 1931.

== Application ==
The Statute of Westminster gave effect to certain political resolutions passed by the Imperial Conferences of 1926 and 1930; in particular, the Balfour Declaration of 1926. The main effect was the removal of the ability of the British parliament to legislate for the Dominions, part of which also required the repeal of the Colonial Laws Validity Act 1865 in its application to the Dominions. King George V expressed his desire that the laws of royal succession be exempt from the statute's provisions, but it was determined that this would be contrary to the principles of equality set out in the Balfour Declaration. Both Canada and the Irish Free State pushed for the ability to amend the succession laws themselves and section 2(2) (allowing a Dominion to amend or repeal laws of paramount force, such as the succession laws, insofar as they are part of the law of that Dominion) was included in the Statute of Westminster at Canada's insistence. After the statute was passed, the British parliament could no longer make laws for the Dominions, other than with the request and consent of the government of that Dominion.

The statute provides in section 4:

No Act of Parliament of the United Kingdom passed after the commencement of this Act shall extend, or be deemed to extend, to a Dominion as part of the law of that Dominion, unless it is expressly declared in that Act that that Dominion has requested, and consented to, the enactment thereof.

It also provides in section 2(1):

No law and no provision of any law made after the commencement of this Act by the Parliament of a Dominion shall be void or inoperative on the ground that it is repugnant to the Law of England, or to the provisions of any existing or future Act of Parliament of the United Kingdom, or to any order, rule or regulation made under any such Act, and the powers of the Parliament of a Dominion shall include the power to repeal or amend any such Act, order, rule or regulation in so far as the same is part of the law of the Dominion.

The whole statute applied to the Dominion of Canada, the Irish Free State, and the Union of South Africa without the need for any acts of ratification; the governments of those countries gave their consent to the application of the law to their respective jurisdictions. Section 10 of the statute provided that sections 2 to 6 would apply in the other three Dominions —Australia, New Zealand, and Newfoundland – only after the respective parliament of that Dominion had legislated to adopt them.

Since 1931, over a dozen new Commonwealth realms have been created, all of which now hold the same powers as the United Kingdom, Canada, Australia, and New Zealand over matters of change to the monarchy, though the Statute of Westminster is not part of their laws. Ireland and South Africa are now republics and Newfoundland is now part of Canada as a province.

=== Australia ===
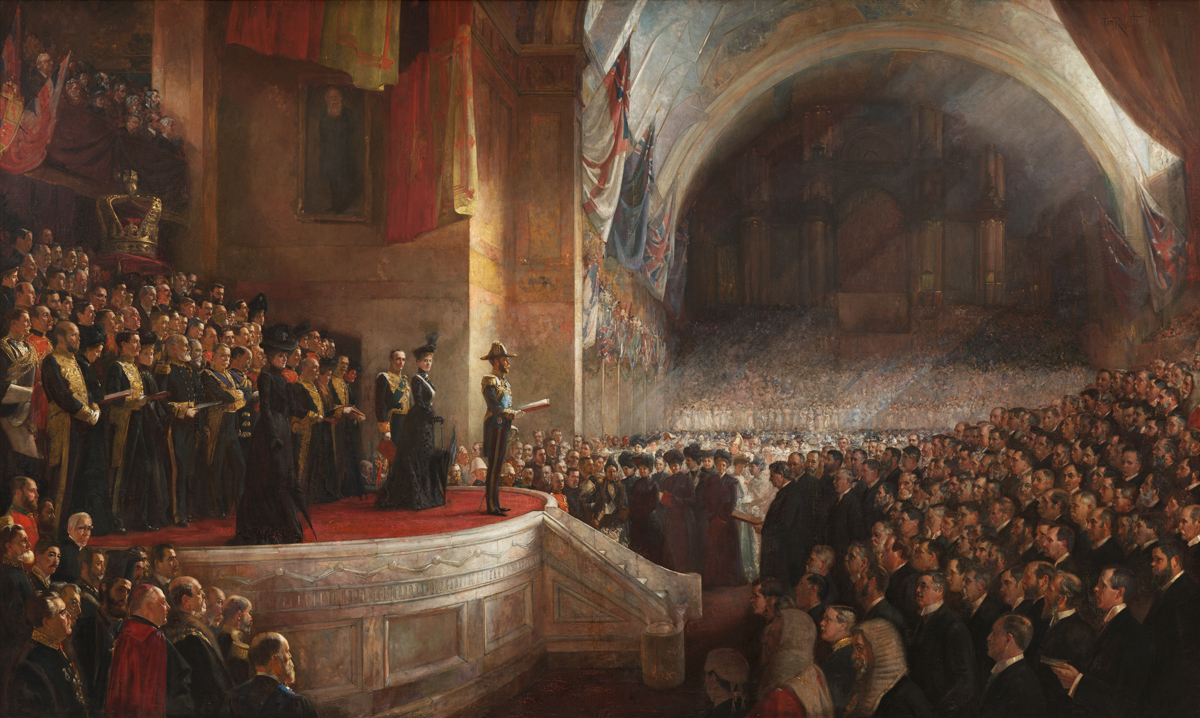
The Big Picture, opening of the Parliament of Australia, 9 May 1901, by Tom Roberts

Australia adopted sections 2 to 6 of the Statute of Westminster with the Statute of Westminster Adoption Act 1942, in order to clarify the validity of certain Australian legislation relating to the Second World War; the adoption was backdated to 3 September 1939, the date that Britain and Australia joined the war.

Adopting section 2 of the statute clarified that the Parliament of Australia was able to legislate inconsistently with British legislation, adopting section 3 clarified that it could legislate with extraterritorial effect. Adopting section 4 clarified that Britain could legislate with effect on Australia as a whole only with Australia's request and consent.

Nonetheless, under section 9 of the statute, on matters not within Commonwealth power Britain could still legislate with effect in all or any of the Australian states, without the agreement of the Commonwealth although only to the extent of "the constitutional practice existing before the commencement" of the statute. However, this capacity had never been used. In particular, it was not used to implement the result of the 1933 Western Australian secession referendum, as it did not have the support of the Australian government.

All British power to legislate with effect in Australia ended with the Australia Act 1986, the British version of which says that it was passed with the request and consent of the Australian Parliament, which had obtained the concurrence of the parliaments of the Australian states.

=== Canada ===
This statute limited the legislative authority of the British parliament over Canada. It effectively gave the country legal autonomy as a self-governing Dominion, though the British parliament retained the power to amend Canada's constitution, a provision which was requested by Canada while a new amending formula was discussed internally. That authority remained in effect until the Constitution Act, 1982, which transferred it to Canada, the final step to achieving full sovereignty.

The British North America Acts—the written elements (in 1931) of the Canadian constitution—were excluded from the application of the statute because of disagreements between the Canadian provinces and the federal government over how the British North America Acts could be otherwise amended. These disagreements were resolved only in time for the passage of the Canada Act 1982, thus completing the patriation of the Canadian constitution to Canada.

At that time, the Parliament of the United Kingdom also repealed ss 4 and 7(1) of the Statute of Westminster as applied to Canada. The Statute of Westminster, as amended, remains a part of the constitution of Canada by virtue of section 52(2)(b) of and the schedule to the Constitution Act, 1982. The Newfoundland Terms of Union expressly provide for the application of the Statute of Westminster to the province of Newfoundland and Labrador.

As a consequence of the statute's adoption, the Parliament of Canada gained the ability to abolish appeals to the Judicial Committee of the Privy Council. Criminal appeals were abolished in 1933, while civil appeals continued until 1949. The passage of the Statute of Westminster meant that changes in British legislation governing the succession to the throne no longer automatically applied to Canada.

=== Irish Free State ===
The Irish Free State never formally adopted the Statute of Westminster, its Executive Council (cabinet) taking the view that the Anglo-Irish Treaty of 1921 had already ended Westminster's right to legislate for the Irish Free State. The Free State's constitution gave the Oireachtas "sole and exclusive power of making laws". Hence, even before 1931, the Irish Free State did not arrest deserters from the British Army and Royal Air Force on its territory, even though the UK believed post-1922 British laws gave the Free State's Garda Síochána the power to do so. The UK's Irish Free State Constitution Act 1922 said, however, "[n]othing in the [Free State] Constitution shall be construed as prejudicing the power of [the British] Parliament to make laws affecting the Irish Free State in any case where, in accordance with constitutional practice, Parliament would make laws affecting other self-governing Dominions". In 1924, Kevin O'Higgins, the Free State's Vice-President of the Executive Council, declared that "Ireland secured by that 'surrender' [the Treaty] a constitutional status equal to that of Canada. 'Canada,' said the late Mr. Bonar Law,' is by the full admission of British statesmen equal in status to Great Britain and as free as Great Britain'. The constitutional status of Ireland, therefore, as determined by the Treaty of 1921, is a status of co-equality with Britain within the British Commonwealth. The second Article of the Constitution of the Free State", he added, "declares that 'All powers of Government and all authority, legislative, executive and judicial, in Ireland are derived from the people of Ireland' ".

Motions of approval of the Report of the Commonwealth Conference had been passed by the Dáil and Seanad in May 1931 and the final form of the Statute of Westminster included the Irish Free State among the Dominions the British Parliament could not legislate for without the Dominion's request and consent. Originally, the UK government had wanted to exclude from the Statute of Westminster the legislation underpinning the 1921 treaty, from which the Free State's constitution had emerged. Executive Council President (Prime Minister) W. T. Cosgrave objected, although he promised that the Executive Council would not amend the legislation unilaterally. The other Dominions backed Cosgrave and, when an amendment to similar effect was proposed at Westminster by John Gretton, parliament duly voted it down. When the statute became law in the UK, Patrick McGilligan, the Free State Minister for External Affairs, stated: "It is a solemn declaration by the British people through their representatives in Parliament that the powers inherent in the Treaty position are what we have proclaimed them to be for the last ten years." He went on to present the statute as largely the fruit of the Irish Free State's efforts to secure for the other Dominions the same benefits it already enjoyed under the treaty. The Statute of Westminster had the effect of granting the Irish Free State internationally recognised independence.

Éamon de Valera led Fianna Fáil to victory in the Irish Free State election of 1932 on a platform of republicanising the Irish Free State from within. Upon taking office, de Valera began removing the monarchical elements of the Constitution, beginning with the Oath of Allegiance. De Valera initially considered invoking the Statute of Westminster in making these changes, but John J. Hearne advised him not to. Abolishing the Oath of Allegiance in effect abrogated the 1921 treaty. Generally, the British thought that this was morally objectionable but legally permitted by the Statute of Westminster. Robert Lyon Moore, a Southern Unionist from County Donegal, challenged the legality of the abolition in the Irish Free State's courts and then appealed to the Judicial Committee of the Privy Council (JCPC) in London. However, the Irish Free State had also abolished the right of appeal to the JCPC. In 1935, the JCPC ruled that both abolitions were valid under the Statute of Westminster. The Irish Free State, which in 1937 was renamed Ireland, left the Commonwealth on 18 April 1949 upon the coming into force of The Republic of Ireland Act 1948.

=== New Zealand ===
The Parliament of New Zealand adopted the Statute of Westminster by passing its Statute of Westminster Adoption Act 1947 in November 1947. The New Zealand Constitution Amendment Act, passed the same year, empowered the New Zealand Parliament to change the constitution, but did not remove the ability of the British Parliament to legislate regarding the New Zealand constitution. The remaining role of the British Parliament was removed by the New Zealand Constitution Act 1986 and the Statute of Westminster was repealed in its entirety.

=== Newfoundland ===
The Dominion of Newfoundland never adopted the Statute of Westminster, especially because of financial troubles and corruption there. By request of the Dominion's government, the United Kingdom established the Commission of Government in 1934, resuming direct rule of Newfoundland. That arrangement remained until Newfoundland became a province of Canada in 1949 following referendums on the issue in 1948. The Statute of Westminster became applicable to Newfoundland when it was admitted to Canada.

=== Union of South Africa ===
Although the Union of South Africa was not among the Dominions that needed to adopt the Statute of Westminster for it to take effect, two laws — the Status of the Union Act, 1934, and the Royal Executive Functions and Seals Act, 1934 — were passed to confirm South Africa's status as a fully sovereign state.

== Implications for succession to the throne ==
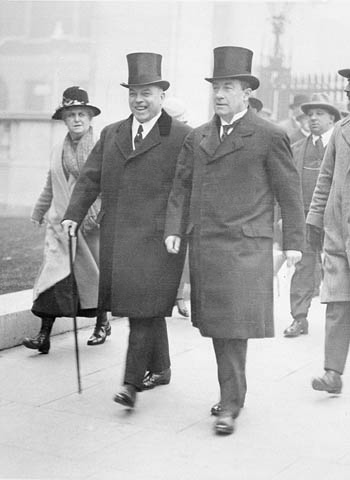
Canadian Prime Minister William Lyon Mackenzie King (left) and his British counterpart Stanley Baldwin (right), 1926

The preamble to the Statute of Westminster sets out a guideline for changing the rules of succession to the Crown. The second paragraph of the preamble to the statute reads:

And whereas it is meet and proper to set out by way of preamble to this act that, inasmuch as the Crown is the symbol of the free association of the members of the British Commonwealth of Nations, and as they are united by a common allegiance to the Crown, it would be in accord with the established constitutional position of all the members of the Commonwealth in relation to one another that any alteration in the law touching the succession to the throne or the royal style and titles shall hereafter require the assent as well of the parliaments of all the Dominions as of the Parliament of the United Kingdom:

Though a preamble is not considered to have the force of statute law, that of the Statute of Westminster has come to be a constitutional convention, which "has always been treated in practice as though it were a binding requirement". The convention was then adopted by every country that subsequently gained its independence from Britain and became a Commonwealth realm.

=== Abdication of King Edward VIII ===
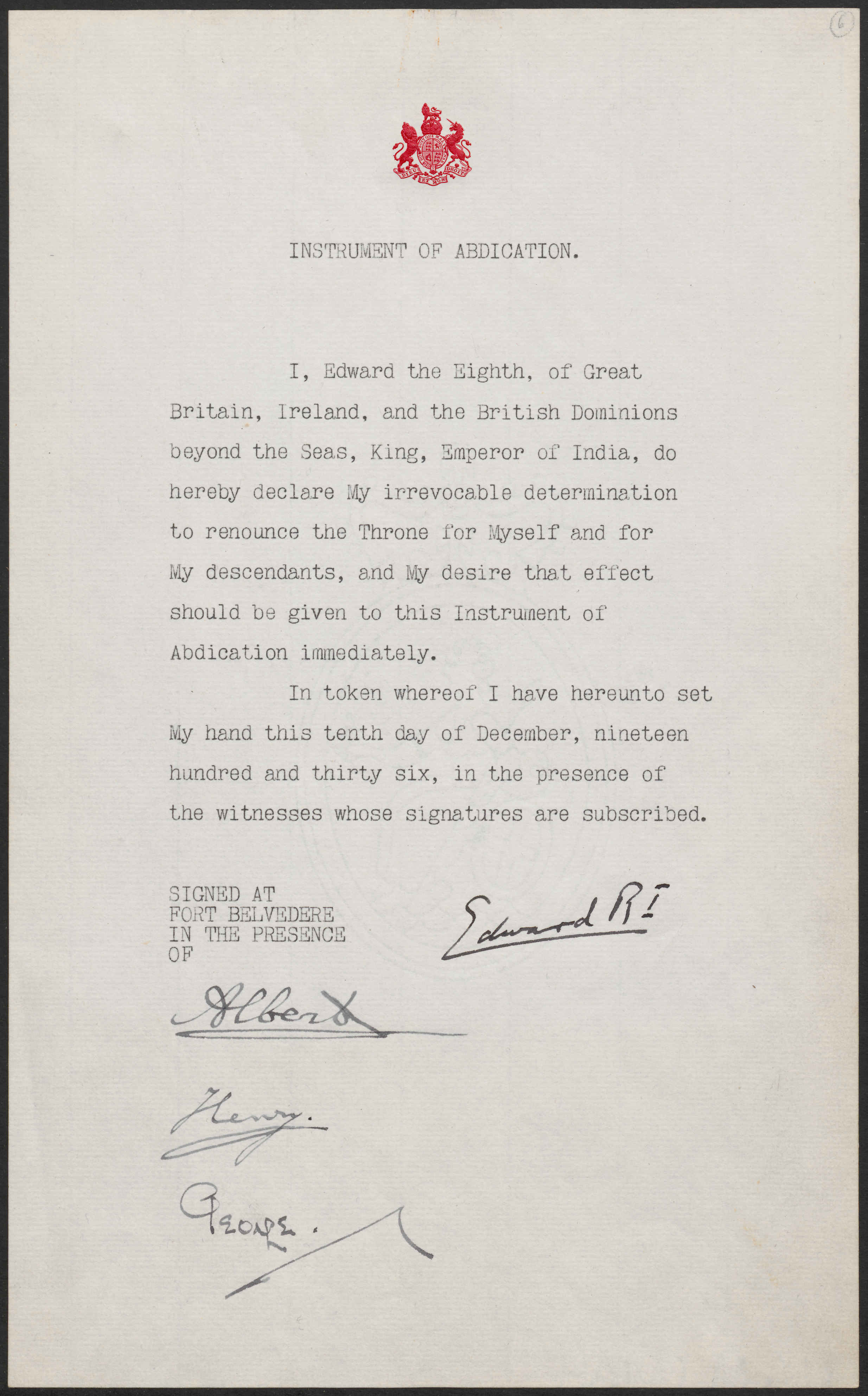
Instrument of abdication signed by Edward VIII and his three brothers, Albert, Henry and George, 10 December 1936

During the abdication crisis in 1936, British Prime Minister Stanley Baldwin consulted the Commonwealth prime ministers at the request of King Edward VIII. The King wanted to marry Wallis Simpson, whom Baldwin and other British politicians considered unacceptable as Queen, as she was an American divorcée. Baldwin was able to get the then-five Dominion prime ministers to agree with this and, thus, register their official disapproval at the King's planned marriage. The King later requested the Commonwealth prime ministers be consulted on a compromise plan, in which he would wed Simpson under a morganatic marriage, pursuant to which she would not become queen. Under Baldwin's pressure, this plan was also rejected by the Dominions. All of these negotiations occurred at a diplomatic level and never went to the Commonwealth parliaments. The enabling legislation that allowed for the actual abdication (His Majesty's Declaration of Abdication Act 1936) did require the assent of each Dominion parliament to be passed and the request and consent of the Dominion governments so as to allow it to be part of the law of each Dominion. For expediency and to avoid embarrassment, the British government had suggested the Dominion governments regard whoever is monarch of the UK to automatically be their monarch, but the Dominions rejected this. Prime Minister of Canada William Lyon Mackenzie King pointed out that the Statute of Westminster required Canada's request and consent to any legislation passed by the British Parliament before it could become part of Canada's laws and affect the line of succession in Canada. The text of the British act states that Canada requested and consented (the only Dominion to formally do both) to the act applying in Canada under the Statute of Westminster, while Australia, New Zealand, and the Union of South Africa simply assented.

In February 1937, the Parliament of South Africa formally gave its assent by passing His Majesty King Edward the Eighth's Abdication Act, 1937, which declared that Edward VIII had abdicated on 10 December 1936; that he and his descendants, if any, would have no right of succession to the throne; and that the Royal Marriages Act 1772 would not apply to him or his descendants, if any. The move was largely done for symbolic purposes, in an attempt by Prime Minister J. B. M. Hertzog to assert South Africa's independence from Britain. In Canada, the federal Parliament passed the Succession to the Throne Act, 1937, to assent to His Majesty's Declaration of Abdication Act and ratify the government's request and consent to it.

In the Irish Free State, President Éamon de Valera used the abdication of King Edward VIII as an opportunity to remove all explicit mention of the monarch from the Constitution of the Irish Free State, through the Constitution (Amendment No. 27) Act 1936, passed on 11 December 1936. The following day, the External Relations Act provided for the King to carry out certain diplomatic functions, if authorised by law; the same act also brought Edward VIII's Instrument of Abdication into effect for the purposes of Irish law (s. 3(2)). A new Constitution of Ireland, with a president, was approved by Irish voters in 1937, with the Irish Free State becoming simply "Ireland", or, in the Irish language, Éire. The position of head of state of Ireland remained unclear until 1949, when Ireland unambiguously became a republic outside the Commonwealth of Nations by enacting The Republic of Ireland Act 1948. Between 1937 and 1949, King George VI was recognised under the External Relations Act as the external head of state, while the President of Ireland served as the internal head of state as a replacement for the Governor-General of the Irish Free State as from 1938, when Douglas Hyde was elected. Ireland was both a Dominion and a de-facto republic, as it was still within the British Commonwealth.

== Commemoration in Canada ==
In Canada, 11 December is commemorated Statute of Westminster Day. The Royal Union Flag (as the Union Jack is called by law in Canada) is flown by federal buildings where a second flagpole is available to mark the day.

== Subsequent developments ==
Section 5 of the act was repealed by section 314(1) of, and schedule 7 to, the Merchant Shipping Act 1995, which came into force on 1 January 1996.

== See also ==
- Chanak Crisis
- Commonwealth of Nations membership criteria
- Westminster system
- Canadian sovereignty
