= His Majesty's Declaration of Abdication Act 1936 =

Act of the Parliament of the United Kingdom

His Majesty's Declaration of Abdication Act 1936 (Note: Section 2.)
- Act of Parliament
- Parliament of the United Kingdom
- Long title: An Act to give effect to His Majesty's declaration of abdication; and for purposes connected therewith.
- Citation: 1 Edw. 8. & 1 Geo. 6. c. 3
- Introduced by: Stanley Baldwin, Prime Minister of the United Kingdom (Commons); Viscount Halifax, Leader of the House of Lords (Lords)
- Territorial extent: United Kingdom; British Empire

Dates
- Royal assent: 11 December 1936
- Commencement: 11 December 1936 (Note: Section 1(1).)
Other legislation
| Amends | Act of Settlement 1701; Royal Marriages Act 1772 |
| Relates to | Statute of Westminster 1931 |

Status: Current legislation

Text of statute as originally enacted

Revised text of statute as amended

Text of the His Majesty's Declaration of Abdication Act 1936 as in force today (including any amendments) within the United Kingdom, from legislation.gov.uk.

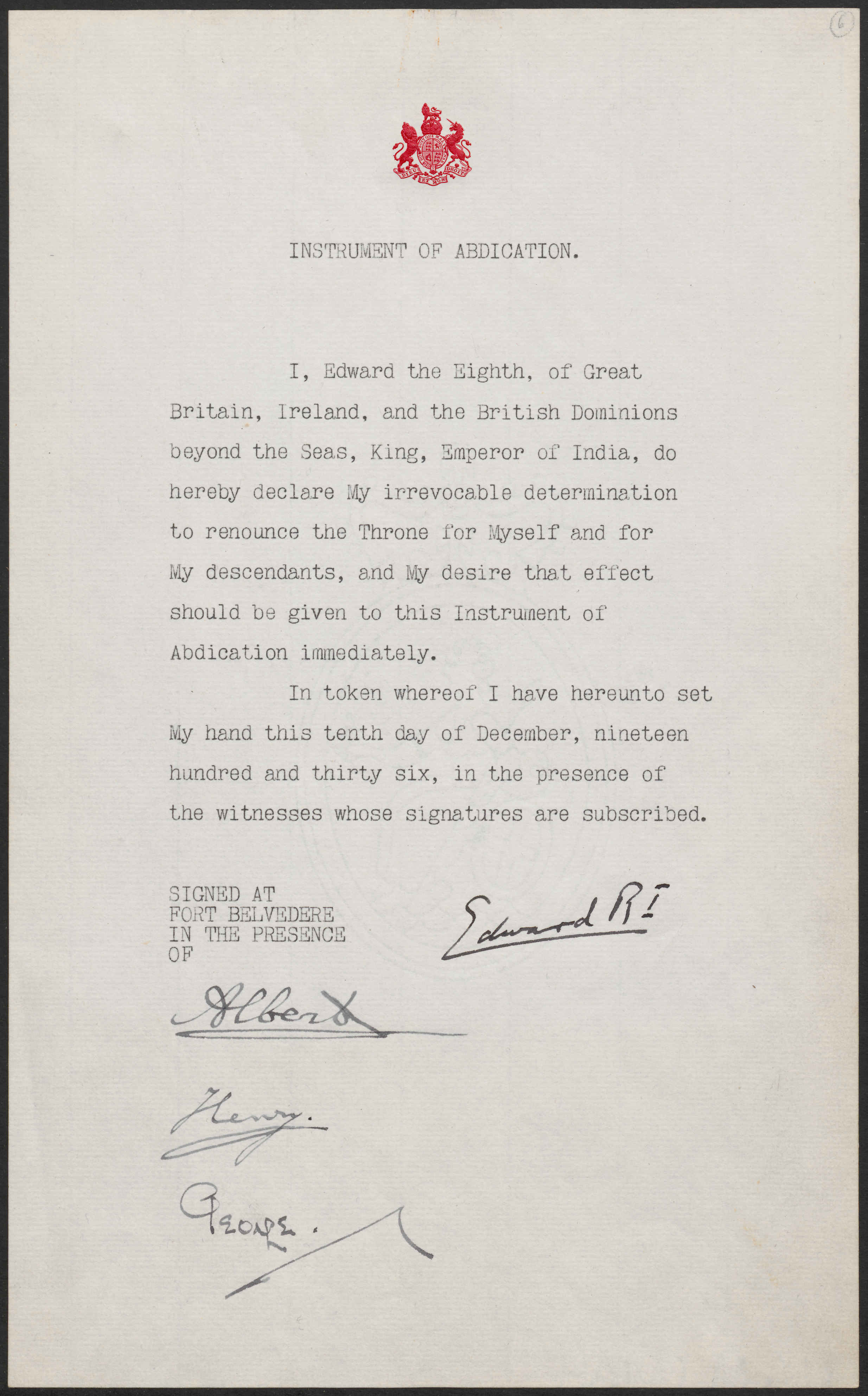
Instrument of Abdication

The His Majesty's Declaration of Abdication Act 1936 (1 Edw. 8. & 1 Geo. 6. c. 3) is an act of the Parliament of the United Kingdom that recognised and ratified the abdication of King Edward VIII and passed succession to his brother King George VI. The act also excluded any possible future descendants of Edward from the line of succession. Edward VIII abdicated in order to marry his lover, Wallis Simpson, after facing opposition from the governments of the United Kingdom and the Dominions.

== Passage ==
The bill was introduced by Stanley Baldwin as prime minister and supported by Clement Attlee as leader of the Opposition.

Independent Labour Party MP James Maxton proposed an amendment that would have blocked the bill, arguing for the abolition of the monarchy given the turmoil and to introduce republicanism. The amendment was seconded by the ILP's Campbell Stephen. The amendment failed 403 to 5.

== Procedure and timing ==
Although Edward VIII had signed a declaration of abdication the previous day, 10 December 1936, he remained king until giving royal assent to His Majesty's Declaration of Abdication Act. He gave this assent on 11 December, at 1.52 p.m., with the Act becoming immediately effective.

The act was passed through the British Houses of Parliament in one day, with no amendments. As the Statute of Westminster 1931 stipulated that the line of succession must remain the same throughout the Crown's realms, the governments of some of the British Dominions – Canada, Australia, South Africa and New Zealand – requested and gave their permission for the act to become part of the law of their respective realms.

The Canadian parliament later passed the Succession to the Throne Act, 1937 to ratify changes to the rules of succession in Canada and ensure consistency with the changes in the rules then in place in the United Kingdom. South Africa passed His Majesty King Edward the Eighth's Abdication Act, 1937, which declared the abdication to have taken effect on 10 December 1936. Australia and New Zealand did not adopt the Statute of Westminster 1931 until the 1940s and did not pass their own legislation. In the Irish Free State, which had been independent from the United Kingdom as a dominion since December 1922, and in which the monarch still had some diplomatic functions, the Oireachtas (parliament) passed the Executive Authority (External Relations) Act 1936, recognising George VI as king from 12 December 1936.
