= Abdication of Edward VIII =

1936 constitutional crisis in Britain

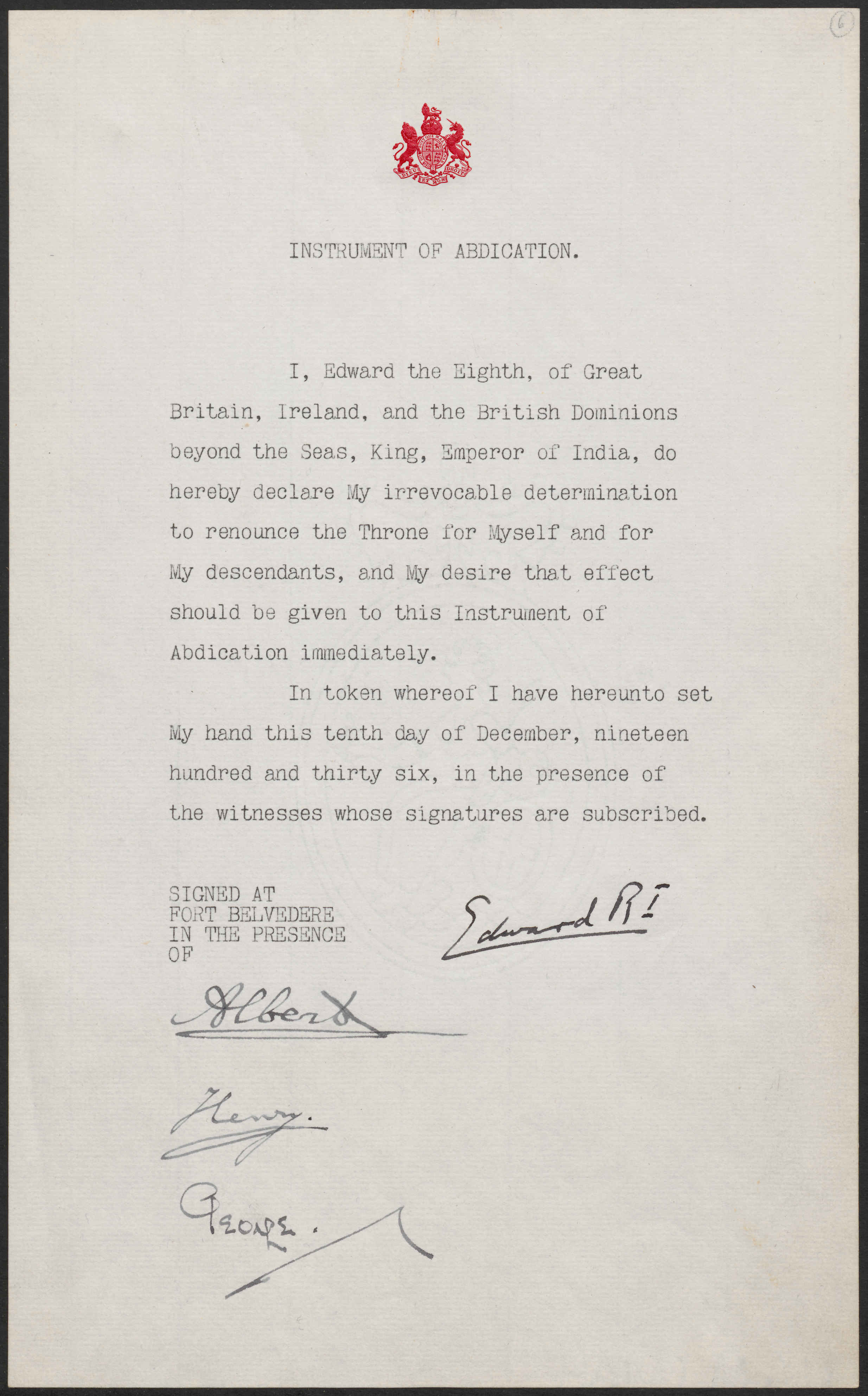
- Instrument of abdication signed by Edward VIII and his three brothers, Albert, Henry and George, 10 December 1936
- Participants: King Edward VIII; Prince Albert, Duke of York
- Outcome: Edward VIII abdicated and Albert became monarch as George VI

In early December 1936, a constitutional crisis in the British Empire arose when King Edward VIII proposed to marry Wallis Simpson, an American socialite who was divorced from her first husband and was in the process of divorcing her second.

The marriage was opposed by the governments of the United Kingdom and the Dominions of the British Commonwealth. Religious, legal, political, and moral objections were raised. As the British monarch, Edward was Supreme Governor of the Church of England, which at this time did not allow divorced people to remarry in church if their ex-spouses were still alive. (Note: In 2002, the Church of England decided to allow divorced people to remarry in church under certain conditions.) For this reason, it was widely believed that Edward could not marry Wallis and remain on the throne. As a double-divorcée, Wallis was perceived to be politically, morally and socially unsuitable as a prospective queen consort. It was widely assumed by the Establishment that she was driven by love of money or position rather than love for the King. Despite the opposition, Edward declared that he loved Wallis and intended to marry her as soon as her second divorce was finalised.

The widespread unwillingness to accept Wallis as the King's consort and Edward's refusal to give her up led to his abdication in December 1936. (Note: The instrument of abdication was signed on 10 December, and given legislative form by His Majesty's Declaration of Abdication Act 1936 the following day. The parliament of the Union of South Africa retroactively approved the abdication with effect from 10 December, and the Irish Free State recognised the abdication on 12 December.) He was succeeded by his brother Albert, who became George VI. Edward was given the title of Duke of Windsor, and styled Royal Highness, following his abdication, and he married Wallis the following year. They remained married until his death 35 years later.

== Background ==
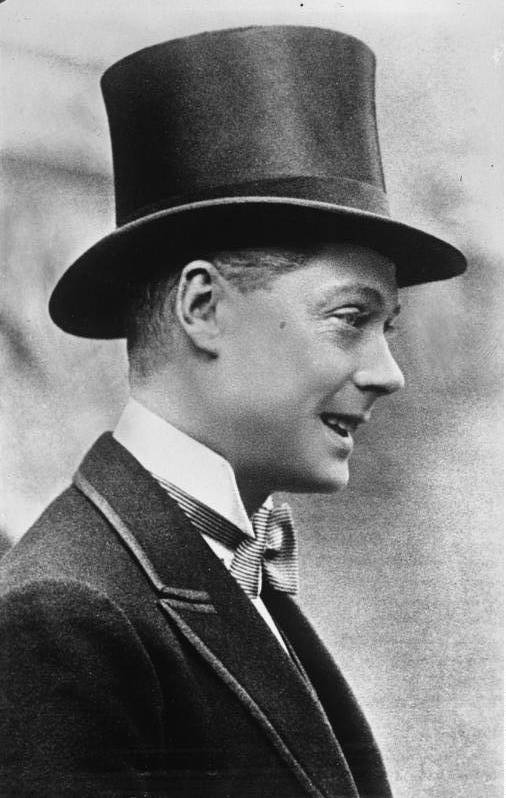
Edward in 1932

Edward had been introduced to Wallis Simpson, an American citizen and wife of British shipping executive Ernest Aldrich Simpson, by Lady Furness on 10 January 1931, when Edward was Prince of Wales. Ernest was Wallis's second husband; her first marriage, to U.S. Navy pilot Win Spencer, had ended in divorce in 1927. It is generally accepted that Wallis and Edward became lovers in 1934, while Lady Furness (who was also in a relationship with the prince) was visiting relatives in the United States. However, Edward adamantly insisted to his father, King George V, that he was not physically intimate with Wallis and that it was inappropriate to describe her as his mistress. Edward's relationship with her further weakened his poor relationship with his parents. Although King George V and Queen Mary met Wallis at Buckingham Palace in 1935, they later refused to receive her. Edward and Wallis were secretly followed by members of the Metropolitan Police Special Branch, who produced reports on the nature of their relationship and their investigations into Wallis's private life that included the "pursuit of vicious gossip" and the identification of a "secret lover". The prospect of having an American divorcée with a questionable past having such sway over the heir apparent led to anxiety among government and establishment figures.

Edward VIII succeeded his father as king on 20 January 1936, after which Wallis attended more official functions as the King's guest. Despite her name appearing regularly in the Court Circular, the name of her husband was conspicuously absent. In the summer of that year, the King eschewed the traditional prolonged stay at Balmoral in favour of a holiday with Wallis in the eastern Mediterranean that was widely covered in the American and continental European press, but not by the British press, which maintained a self-imposed silence. Nevertheless, Canadians and expatriate Britons, who had access to the foreign reports, were largely scandalised by the coverage.

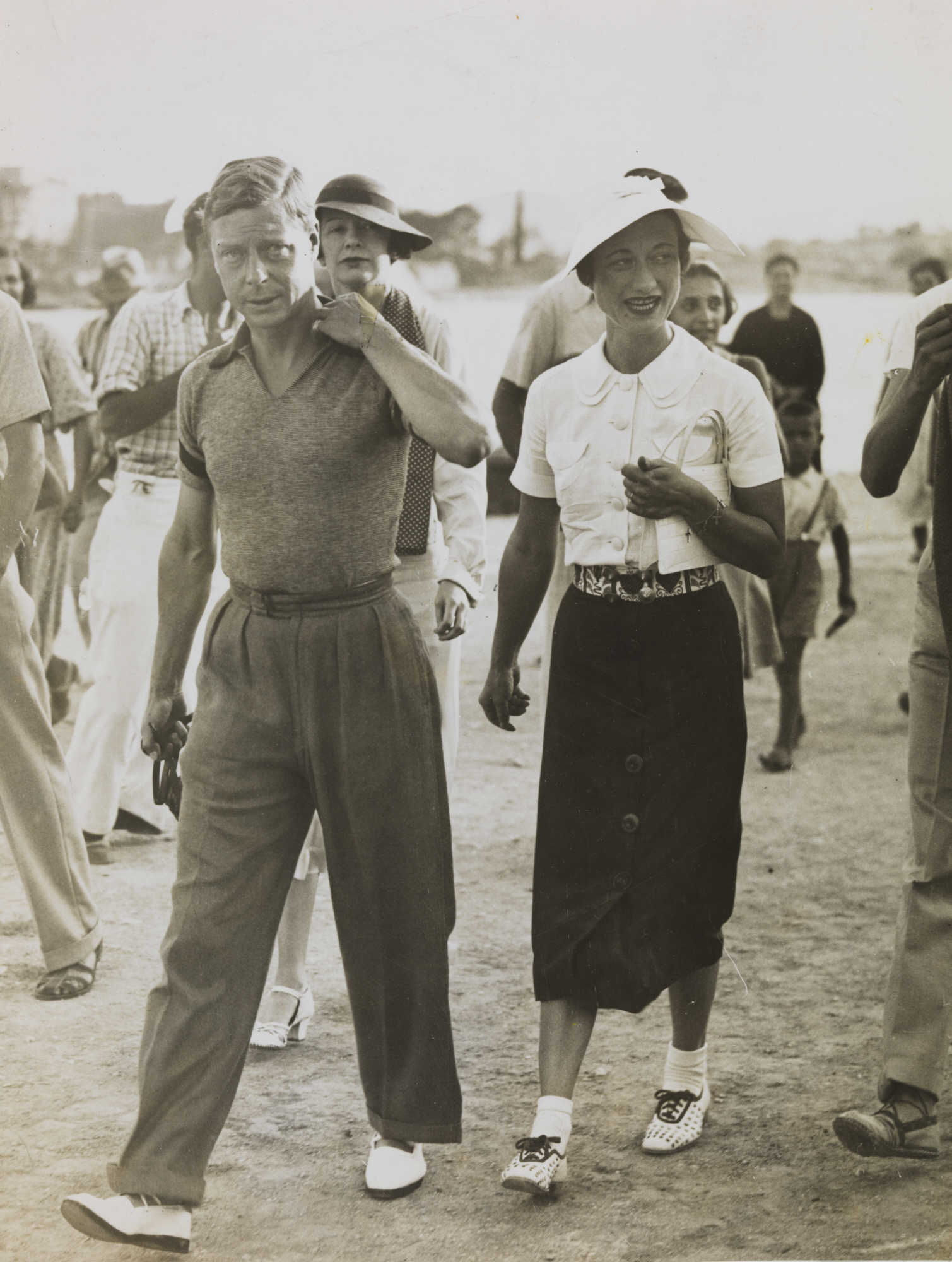
Edward VIII and Wallis Simpson in the Mediterranean, 1936

By October, it was rumoured in high society and abroad that Edward intended to marry Wallis as soon as she was free to do so. At the end of that month, the crisis came to a head when she filed for divorce and the American press announced that marriage between her and the King was imminent. The King's private secretary, Alec Hardinge, wrote to him on 13 November, warning: "The silence in the British Press on the subject of Your Majesty's friendship with Mrs Simpson is not going to be maintained [...] Judging by the letters from British subjects living in foreign countries where the Press has been outspoken, the effect will be calamitous." Senior British ministers knew that Hardinge had written to the King and may have helped him draft the letter.

The King invited Prime Minister Stanley Baldwin to Buckingham Palace the following Monday (16 November) and informed him that he intended to marry Wallis. Baldwin replied that such a marriage would not be acceptable to the people, stating: "the Queen becomes the Queen of the country. Therefore in the choice of a Queen the voice of the people must be heard". Baldwin's view was shared by the Australian High Commissioner in London, Stanley Bruce, who was also a former prime minister of Australia. On the same day that Hardinge wrote to the King, Bruce met Hardinge and then wrote to Baldwin, expressing horror at the idea of a marriage between the King and Wallis.

Nevertheless, the British press remained quiet on the subject until Alfred Blunt, Bishop of Bradford, gave a speech to his diocesan conference on 1 December, which alluded to the King's need of divine grace: "We hope that he is aware of his need. Some of us wish that he gave more positive signs of his awareness." The press took this for the first public comment by a notable person on the crisis and it became front-page news on 3 December. When asked about it later, however, the bishop claimed he had not heard of Wallis at the time he wrote the speech, and that it was an expression of disappointment at the King's conspicuous failure to attend church services regularly. Acting on the advice of Edward's staff, Wallis left Britain for the south of France two days later in an attempt to escape intense press attention. Both she and the King were devastated by the separation. At a tearful departure, the King told her, "I shall never give you up."

== Opposition ==
Opposition to the King and his marriage came from several directions. Edward's desire to modernise the monarchy and make it more accessible, though appreciated by many of the public, was distrusted by the British Establishment. Edward upset the aristocracy by treating their traditions and ceremonies with disdain, and many were offended by his abandonment of accepted social norms and mores.

=== Social and moral ===
Government ministers and the royal family found Wallis's background and behaviour unacceptable for a potential queen. Rumours and innuendo about her circulated in society. The King's mother, Queen Mary, was even told that Wallis might have held some sort of sexual control over Edward, as she had released him from an undefined sexual dysfunction through practices learnt in a Chinese brothel. This view was partially shared by Alan Don, Chaplain to the Archbishop of Canterbury, who wrote that he suspected the King "is sexually abnormal which may account for the hold Mrs S. has over him". Even Edward VIII's official biographer, Philip Ziegler, noted that: "There must have been some sort of sadomasochistic relationship [...] [Edward] relished the contempt and bullying she bestowed on him."

Police detectives following Wallis reported back that, while involved with Edward, she was also involved with a married car mechanic and salesman named Guy Trundle. This may well have been passed on to senior figures in the establishment, including members of the royal family. Joseph Kennedy, the American ambassador, described her as a "tart", and his wife, Rose, refused to dine with her.

Wallis was perceived to be pursuing Edward for his money; his equerry wrote that she would eventually leave him, "having secured the cash". The future prime minister Neville Chamberlain (then Chancellor of the Exchequer) wrote in his diary that she was "an entirely unscrupulous woman who is not in love with the King but is exploiting him for her own purposes. She has already ruined him in money and jewels".

United Kingdom–United States relations were strained during the inter-war years and the majority of Britons were reluctant to accept an American as queen consort. At the time, some members of the British upper class looked down on Americans with disdain and considered them socially inferior. In contrast, the American public was clearly in favour of the marriage, as was most of the American press.

=== Religious and legal ===
In Edward's lifetime, the Church of England forbade the remarriage of divorced people in church while a former spouse was still living. The monarch was required by law to be in communion with the Church of England, and was its nominal head or Supreme Governor. In 1935 the Church of England reaffirmed that, "in no circumstances can Christian men or women re-marry during the lifetime of a wife or a husband". The archbishop of Canterbury, Cosmo Gordon Lang, held that the king, as the head of the Church of England, could not marry a divorcée. If Edward married Wallis, a divorcée who would soon have two living ex-husbands, in a civil ceremony, it would directly conflict with Church teaching and his role as the Church's ex officio head. (Note: Although Henry VIII remarried within the lifetimes of two of his ex-wives, Catherine of Aragon and Anne of Cleves, those marriages were annulled—that is, declared invalid under canon law—rather than ended by divorce as such. Divorce—the dissolution of a valid marriage—became a regular legal process with the Matrimonial Causes Act 1857, but remained unrecognized by the Church. A person with an annulment has not been legally married, whereas a person with a divorce has been married already.)

Wallis's first divorce (in the United States on the grounds of "emotional incompatibility") was not recognised by the Church of England and, if challenged in the English courts, might not have been recognised under English law. At that time, the Church and English law considered adultery to be the only grounds for divorce. Under this argument, all subsequent marriages would be considered bigamous and legally invalid. The Matrimonial Causes Act 1937, which was passed shortly after Edward and Wallis's marriage, would allow for numerous other grounds for divorce.

=== Political ===
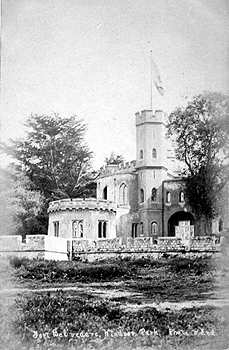
Fort Belvedere, Surrey, Edward's residence in Windsor Great Park

When Edward visited depressed mining villages in Wales, his comment that "something must be done" led to concerns among elected politicians that he would interfere in political matters, traditionally avoided by constitutional monarchs. Ramsay MacDonald, Lord President of the Council, wrote of the King's comments: "These escapades should be limited. They are an invasion into the field of politics and should be watched constitutionally." Although Edward's comments had made him popular in Wales, he became extremely unpopular with the public in Scotland following his refusal to open a new wing of Aberdeen Royal Infirmary, saying he could not do so because he was in mourning for his father and delegated the task to his brother Albert despite the logical inconsistency in doing so since both men shared the same father, George V. The day after the opening, he was pictured in newspapers on holiday: he had turned down the public event in favour of meeting Wallis.

As Prince of Wales, Edward had publicly referred to Labour county councillors as "cranks" and made speeches counter to government policy. During his reign as king, his refusal to accept the advice of ministers continued: he opposed the imposition of sanctions on Fascist Italy after its invasion of Ethiopia, refused to receive the deposed Emperor of Ethiopia, and would not support a strengthening of the League of Nations.

Members of the British government became further dismayed by the proposed marriage after being told that Wallis was an agent of Nazi Germany. The Foreign Office obtained leaked dispatches from the German Reich's Ambassador to the United Kingdom, Joachim von Ribbentrop, which revealed his strong view that opposition to the marriage was motivated by the wish "to defeat those Germanophile forces which had been working through Mrs Simpson". It was rumoured that Wallis had access to confidential government papers sent to Edward, which he left unguarded at his Fort Belvedere residence. While Edward was abdicating, the personal protection officers guarding Wallis in exile in France sent reports to Downing Street suggesting that she might "flit to Germany".

== Options considered ==
As a result of these rumours and arguments, the belief strengthened among the British establishment that Wallis could not become a royal consort. The British prime minister, Stanley Baldwin, explicitly advised Edward that the majority of people would be opposed to his marrying Wallis, indicating that if he did, in direct contravention of his ministers' advice, the government would resign en masse. The King responded, according to his own later account, "I intend to marry Mrs Simpson as soon as she is free to marry [...] if the Government opposed the marriage, as the Prime Minister had given me reason to believe it would, then I was prepared to go." Under pressure from the King, and "startled" at the suggested abdication, Baldwin agreed to take further soundings on three options:

1. Edward and Wallis marry and she become queen (a royal marriage);
2. Edward and Wallis marry, but she not become queen, instead receiving some courtesy title (a morganatic marriage); or
3. Abdication for Edward and any potential heirs he might father, allowing him to make any marital decisions without further constitutional implications.

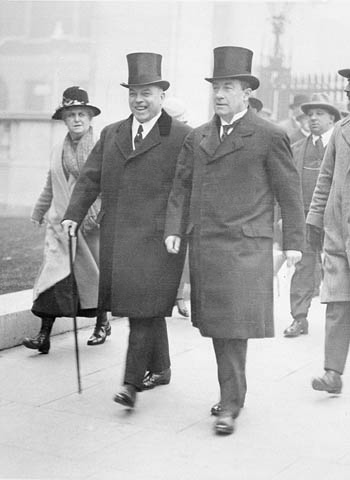
Canadian prime minister William Lyon Mackenzie King (left) and his British counterpart Stanley Baldwin (right), 1926

The second option had European precedents, including Edward's own great-grandfather, Duke Alexander of Württemberg, but it had no parallel in British constitutional history. The prime ministers of the five Dominions (Australia, Canada, New Zealand, South Africa, and the Irish Free State) were consulted, and the majority agreed that there was "no alternative to course (3)". William Lyon Mackenzie King (Prime Minister of Canada), Joseph Lyons (Prime Minister of Australia), and J. B. M. Hertzog (Prime Minister of South Africa) opposed options 1 and 2. Mackenzie King told Edward to do "what he believed in his own heart was right" and the Canadian government appealed to the King to put his duty before his feelings for Wallis. Governor General of Canada Lord Tweedsmuir told Buckingham Palace and Baldwin that Canadians held deep affection for the King, but also that Canadian public opinion would be outraged if Edward married a divorcée. Michael Joseph Savage (Prime Minister of New Zealand) rejected option 1 and thought that option 2 "might be possible [...] if some solution along these lines were found to be practicable", but "would be guided by the decision of the Home government". In communications with the British government, Éamon de Valera (President of the Executive Council of the Irish Free State) remarked that as a Roman Catholic country, the Irish Free State did not recognise divorce. He supposed that if the British people would not accept Wallis then abdication was the only possible solution. On 24 November, Baldwin consulted the three leading opposition politicians in Britain: Leader of the Opposition Clement Attlee, Liberal leader Sir Archibald Sinclair, and Winston Churchill. Sinclair and Attlee agreed that options 1 and 2 were unacceptable, and Churchill pledged to support the government.

Churchill did not support the government, however. In July, he had advised the King's legal counsel, Walter Monckton, against the divorce, but his advice was ignored. As soon as the affair became public knowledge, Churchill started to pressure Baldwin and the King to delay any decisions until Parliament and the people had been consulted. In a private letter to Geoffrey Dawson, the editor of The Times newspaper, Churchill suggested that a delay would be beneficial because, given time, the King might fall out of love with Wallis. Baldwin rejected the request for delay, presumably because he preferred to resolve the crisis quickly. Supporters of the King alleged a conspiracy between Baldwin, Geoffrey Dawson, and Cosmo Gordon Lang, the archbishop of Canterbury. The royal physician Bertrand Dawson was possibly involved in a plan to force the prime minister to retire on the grounds of heart disease, but he eventually accepted, on the evidence of an early electrocardiograph, that Baldwin's heart was sound.

Political support for the King was scattered and comprised politicians alienated from the mainstream parties such as Churchill, Oswald Mosley (leader of the British Union of Fascists), and Harry Pollitt and Walton Newbold of the Communist Party of Great Britain. Former prime minister David Lloyd George also supported the King despite disliking Wallis. He was, however, unable to take any active role in the crisis because he was on holiday in Jamaica with his mistress Frances Stevenson. In early December, rumours circulated that the King's supporters would join in a "King's Party", led by Churchill. However, there was no concerted effort to form an organised movement and Churchill had no intention of leading one. Nevertheless, the rumours damaged the King and Churchill severely, as members of parliament were horrified at the idea of the King interfering in politics.

The letters and diaries of working-class people and ex-servicemen generally demonstrate support for the King, while those from the middle and upper classes tend to express indignation and distaste. The Times, The Morning Post, Daily Herald, and newspapers owned by Lord Kemsley, such as The Daily Telegraph, opposed the marriage. On the other hand, the Daily Express and the Daily Mail, owned by Lord Beaverbrook and Lord Rothermere, respectively, appeared to support a morganatic marriage. The King estimated that the newspapers in favour had a circulation of 12.5 million, and those against had 8.5 million.

On 3 December, Edward had a "tense" meeting with Baldwin. Backed by Churchill and Beaverbrook, Edward proposed to broadcast a speech via BBC Radio. The proposed text invoked the "ancient custom" for a King to "address his public utterances to his people". Edward proposed to remind his listeners: "I am still the same man whose motto was 'Ich Dien', I serve." In the proposed speech, Edward indicated his desire to remain on the throne or to be recalled to it if forced to abdicate, while marrying Wallis morganatically. In one section, Edward proposed to say:

Neither Mrs Simpson nor I have ever sought to insist that she should be queen. All we desired was that our married happiness should carry with it a proper title and dignity for her, befitting my wife. Now that I have at last been able to take you into my confidence, I feel it is best to go away for a while, so that you may reflect calmly and quietly, but without undue delay, on what I have said.

Baldwin blocked the speech, saying that it would shock many people and would be a grave breach of constitutional principles. By modern convention, the sovereign could only act with the advice and counsel of ministers. In seeking the people's support against the government, Edward was opting to oppose binding ministerial advice and instead act as a private individual. Edward's British ministers felt that, in proposing the speech, Edward had revealed his disdainful attitude towards constitutional conventions and threatened the political neutrality of the Crown.

Cabinet Office files released in 2013 show that on or before 5 December 1936, the Home Secretary, Sir John Simon, had ordered the General Post Office (which controlled British telephone services) to intercept "telephone communications between Fort Belvedere and Buckingham Palace on the one hand and the continent of Europe on the other".

On 5 December, having in effect been told that he could not keep the throne and marry Wallis, and having had his request to broadcast to the Empire to explain "his side of the story" blocked on constitutional grounds, Edward chose the third option.

== Legal manoeuvres ==
Following Wallis's divorce hearing on 27 October 1936, her solicitor, John Theodore Goddard, became concerned that there would be a "patriotic" citizen's intervention (a legal device to block the divorce), and that such an intervention would be successful. The courts could not grant a collaborative divorce (a dissolution of marriage consented to by both parties), and so the case was being handled as if it were an undefended at-fault divorce brought against Ernest, with Wallis as the innocent, injured party. The divorce action would fail if the citizen's intervention showed that the Simpsons had colluded by, for example, conniving in or staging the appearance of his adultery so that she could marry someone else. On Monday 7 December 1936, the King heard that Goddard planned to fly to the south of France to see Wallis. The King summoned him and expressly forbade him to make the journey, fearing that the visit might put doubts in Wallis's mind. Goddard went straight to Downing Street to see Baldwin, as a result of which he was provided with an aeroplane to take him directly to Cannes.

Upon his arrival, Goddard warned his client that a citizen's intervention, should it arise, was likely to succeed. It was, according to Goddard, his duty to advise her to withdraw her divorce petition. Wallis refused, but they both telephoned the King to inform him that she was willing to give him up so that he could remain king. It was, however, too late; the King had already made up his mind to go, even if he could not marry Wallis. Indeed, as the belief that the abdication was inevitable gathered strength, Goddard stated that: "[his] client was ready to do anything to ease the situation but the other end of the wicket [Edward VIII] was determined".

Goddard had a weak heart and had never flown before, so he asked his doctor, William Kirkwood, to accompany him on the trip. As Kirkwood was a resident at a maternity hospital, his presence led to false speculation that Wallis was pregnant, and even that she was having an abortion. The press excitedly reported that the solicitor had flown to Wallis accompanied by a gynaecologist and an anaesthetist (who was actually the lawyer's clerk).

== Abdication ==
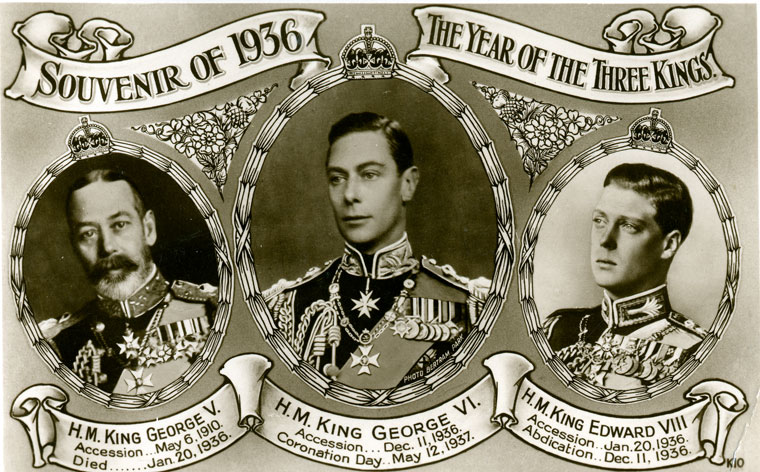
"The Year of the Three Kings", postcard 1936

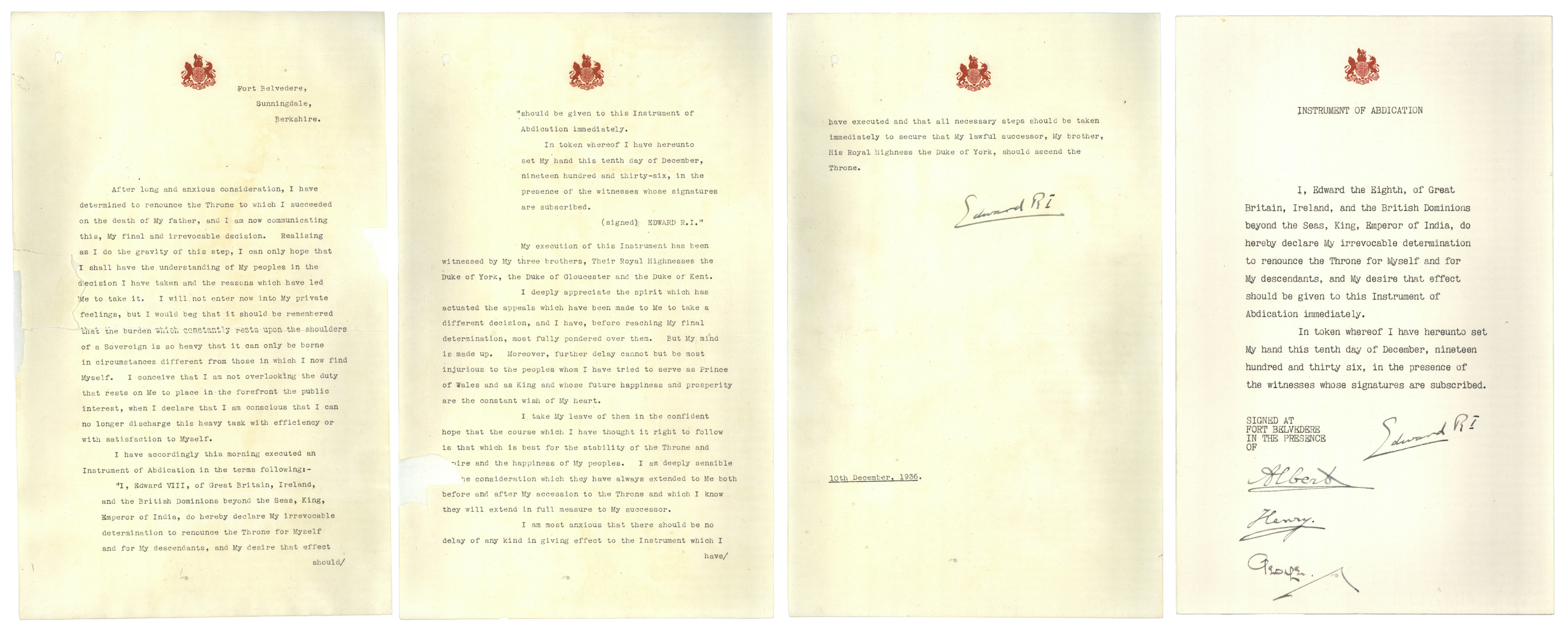
Abdication statement of Edward VIII

At Fort Belvedere, on 10 December, Edward signed his written abdication notices, (Note: There were 15, including one for each Dominion, India, the British House of Commons, the House of Lords, and the Prime Minister of the United Kingdom.) witnessed by his three younger brothers: Prince Albert, Duke of York (who succeeded Edward as George VI); Prince Henry, Duke of Gloucester; and Prince George, Duke of Kent. The following day, it was given effect by act of parliament: His Majesty's Declaration of Abdication Act 1936.

Under changes introduced by the Statute of Westminster in 1931, a single Crown for the entire empire had been replaced by multiple crowns, one for each Dominion, worn by a single monarch in an organisation then-known as the British Commonwealth. Though the British government, hoping for expediency and to avoid embarrassment, wished the Dominions to accept the actions of the "home" government, the Dominions held that Edward's abdication required the consent of each Commonwealth state. According to the Statute of Westminster, the act passed by the UK Parliament could become law in other Dominions at their request. This was duly given by the Parliament of Australia, which was at the time in session, and by the governments of Canada, South Africa, and New Zealand, whose parliaments were in recess.

Before the crisis had become public, Sir Maurice Gwyer, the British parliamentary counsel and one of the principal framers of the Statute of Westminster, expressed to Attorney-General Donald Somervell on 23 November 1936 the concern that the Irish Free State might refuse to either give its request and consent to British legislation or to pass its own. Legal experts discussed whether an abdication would have force in the Irish Free State, regardless, or if Edward VIII might remain king of that country while George VI reigned elsewhere. In the end, it was the possibility of the latter, and, consequently, Wallis becoming Queen of the Irish Free State, that was used to push the Oireachtas to legislate. The government of the Irish Free State, taking the opportunity presented by the crisis and in a major step towards its eventual transition to a republic, passed an amendment to its constitution on 11 December to remove references to the Crown and abolish the office of Governor-General of the Irish Free State; the King's abdication was recognised a day later in the External Relations Act, leading to a 24-hour period wherein Edward was king in the Irish Free State and his brother was king of the UK and other Dominions. In Canada, the Succession to the Throne Act 1937 symbolically confirmed the abdication. South Africa passed His Majesty King Edward the Eighth's Abdication Act 1937, which declared that the abdication took effect there on 10 December, meaning abdications took place on three separate dates across the Commonwealth.

Edward's supporters felt that he had "been hounded from the throne by that arch humbug Baldwin", but many members of the establishment were relieved by Edward's departure. Mackenzie King wrote in his diary on 8 December 1936 that Edward's "sense of right or wrong has been largely obliterated by the jazz of life he has led for years" and, upon receiving news of Edward's final decision to abdicate, "if that is the kind of man he is it is better he should not be longer on the Throne." Edward's own Assistant Private Secretary, Alan Lascelles, had told Baldwin as early as 1927: "I can't help thinking that the best thing that could happen to him, and to the country, would be for him to break his neck." Lascelles resigned in 1929 "in despair".

Abdication speech
The full text of the speech at Wikisource

On 11 December 1936, Edward made a BBC radio broadcast from Windsor Castle; having abdicated, he was introduced by Sir John Reith as "His Royal Highness Prince Edward". The official address had been polished by Churchill and was moderate in tone, speaking about Edward's inability to do his job "as I would have wished to do, without the help and support of the woman I love". The address attracted the largest audience of any radio broadcast in the world up to that point. Edward's reign had lasted 327 days, the shortest of any monarch in Britain since the disputed reign of Lady Jane Grey (10–19 July 1553). The day following the broadcast he left Britain for Austria.

== Post-abdication ==
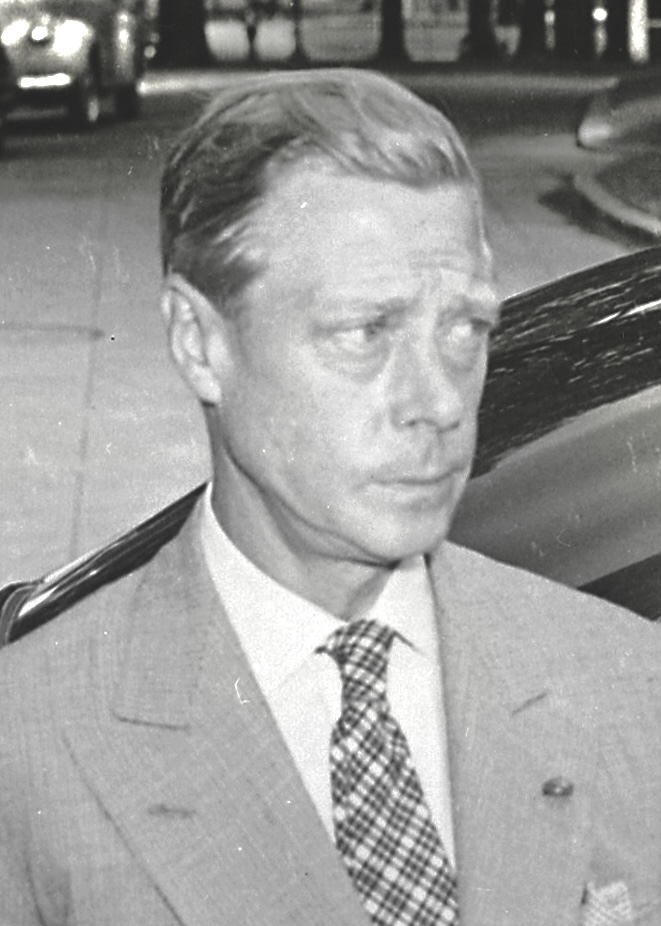
The Duke of Windsor, formerly Edward VIII, 1945

George VI granted his elder brother the title of Duke of Windsor with the style His Royal Highness on 12 December 1936. On 3 May the following year, the Simpsons' divorce was made final. The case was handled quietly and it barely featured in some newspapers. The Times printed a single sentence below a separate, and seemingly unconnected, report announcing the Duke's departure from Austria.

Edward married Wallis in France on 3 June 1937. She became the Duchess of Windsor, but, much to Edward's disgust, George VI issued letters patent that denied her the style of Her Royal Highness. The couple settled in France, and the Duke received a tax-free allowance from his brother, which Edward supplemented by writing his memoirs and by illegal currency trading. He also profited from the sale of Balmoral Castle and Sandringham House to George VI, for a "colossal sum" according to Alan Lascelles. Both estates are private property and not part of the Royal Estate, and were therefore inherited and owned by Edward, regardless of the abdication.

In October 1937, the Duke and Duchess visited Germany, against the advice of the British government, and met Hitler at his Obersalzberg retreat. The visit was much publicised by the German media. During the visit the Duke gave full Nazi salutes. In an article for the New York Daily News and Chicago Tribune of 13 December 1966 the Duke wrote that in 1937 Hitler persuaded him "it was in Britain's interest and in Europe's too, that Germany be encouraged to strike east and smash Communism forever [...] I thought the rest of us could be fence-sitters while the Nazis and the Reds slogged it out."

After the outbreak of the Second World War in September 1939, Edward was assigned to the British Military Mission in France. In February 1940, the German ambassador in The Hague, Count Julius von Zech-Burkersroda, claimed that Edward had leaked the Allied war plans for the defence of Belgium. When Germany invaded the north of France in May 1940, the Duke and Duchess fled to Lisbon.

Under the code name Operation Willi, Nazi agents, principally Walter Schellenberg, plotted unsuccessfully to persuade the Duke to leave Portugal, and contemplated kidnapping him. Lord Caldecote warned Churchill that the Duke "is well-known to be pro-Nazi and he may become a centre of intrigue". Churchill threatened the Duke with a court-martial if he did not return to British soil.

In July 1940, Edward was appointed Governor of the Bahamas. Edward reportedly told an acquaintance, "After the war is over and Hitler will crush the Americans [...] we'll take over [...] They [the British] don't want me as their king, but I'll be back as their leader." He was reported as saying that "it would be a tragic thing for the world if Hitler was overthrown". Comments like these reinforced the belief that the Duke and Duchess held Nazi sympathies and the effect of the abdication crisis of 1936 was to force off the throne a man with extreme political opinions. Claims that Edward would have been a threat or that he was removed by a political conspiracy to dethrone him remain speculative and "persist largely because since 1936 the contemporary public considerations have lost most of their force and so seem, wrongly, to provide insufficient explanation for the King's departure".

== See also ==
- Abandoned coronation of Edward VIII
